= Japan–United Kingdom relations =

- Japan: United Kingdom

Diplomatic mission
- Embassy of Japan, London: British Embassy, Tokyo

Envoy
- Ambassador of Japan to the United Kingdom Hiroshi Suzuki (since November 2024): Ambassador of the United Kingdom to Japan; Julia Longbottom (since 1 March 2021)

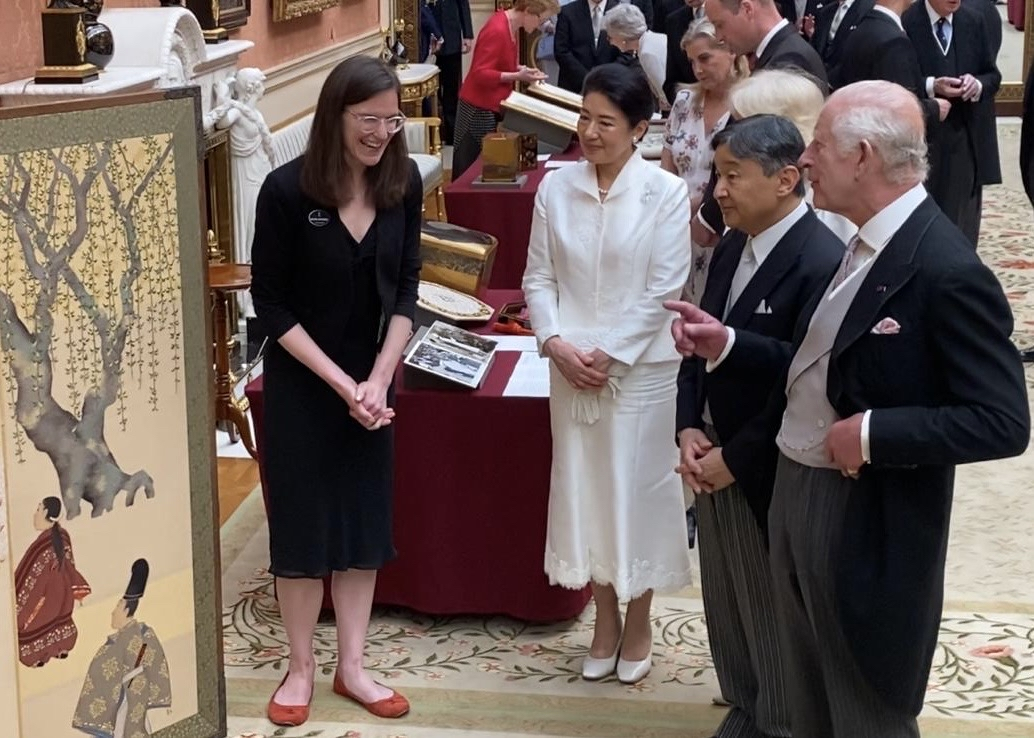
Emperor Naruhito and Empress Masako with King Charles III at Buckingham Palace in 2024; monarchs of both countries have exchanged their highest honours since 1906

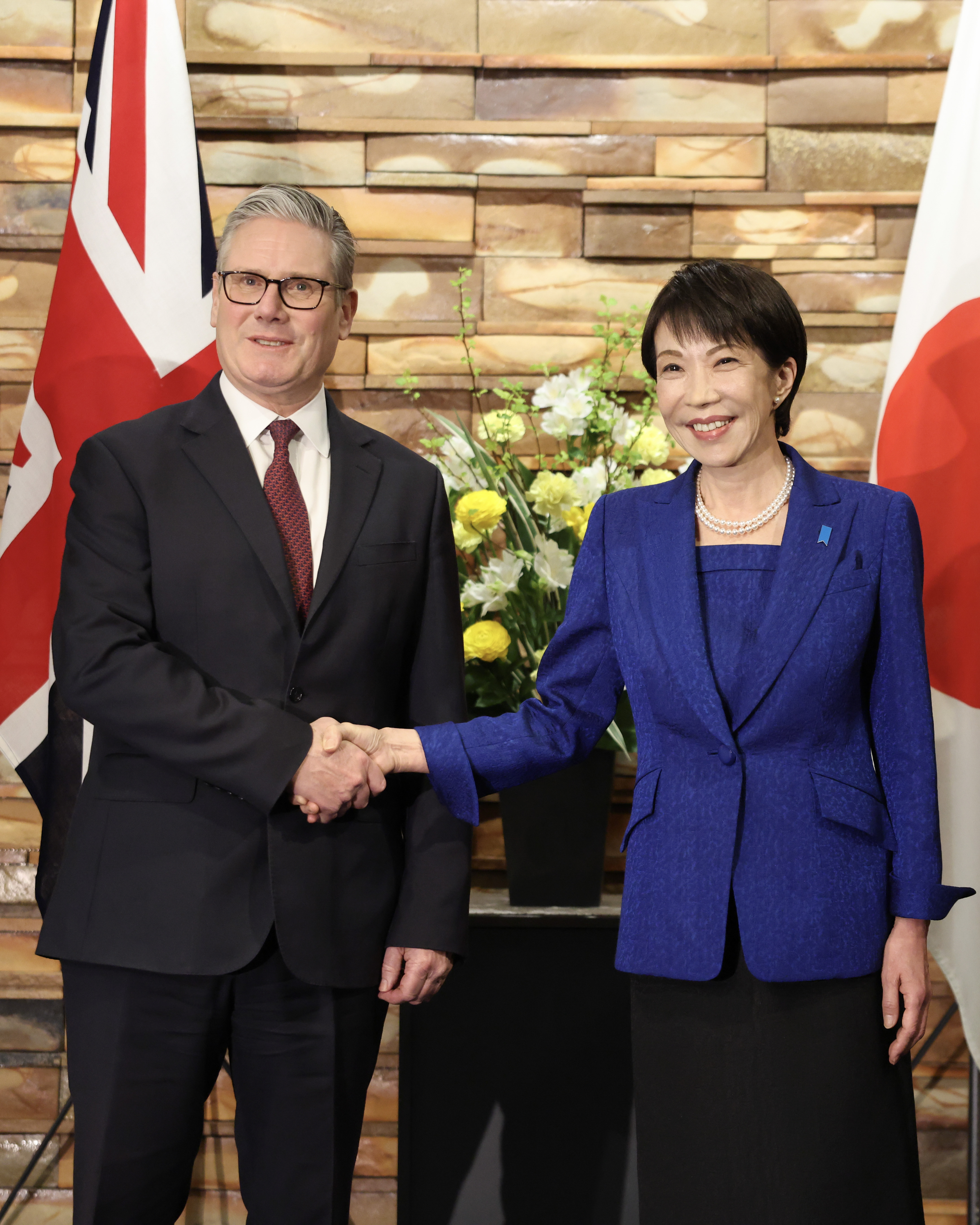
British Prime Minister Keir Starmer with Japanese Prime Minister Sanae Takaichi at the Prime Minister's Office of Japan, Tokyo (2026)

Foreign relations between Japan and the United Kingdom (日英関係, Nichieikankei) were established on 26 August 1858 and involve diplomatic, economic, and historical ties between the two countries.

Both countries are members of the Comprehensive and Progressive Agreement for Trans-Pacific Partnership, G7, G20, International Criminal Court, OECD, United Nations, and World Trade Organization. They also share a free trade agreement called the Japan–United Kingdom Comprehensive Economic Partnership Agreement, a tax treaty, and a reciprocal access agreement; the United Kingdom is one of only three countries to share the latter with Japan, (Note: The other two are Australia and the Philippines.) and is the only European country to do so.

== History ==
The history of the relationship between Japan and England began in 1600 with the arrival of William Adams (Adams the Pilot or Miura Anjin), who became the first of very few non-Japanese samurai after arriving on the shores of Kyushu at Usuki (present-day Ōita Prefecture). There were no formal relations between the two countries during the Sakoku period (1641–1853); as the Dutch were the only Europeans permitted to trade, they acted as intermediaries.

Formal diplomatic ties began with the treaty of 1854, which eventually led to the Anglo-Japanese Alliance of 1902. This marked the end of the "splendid isolation" philosophy Britain had followed since 1815, while Japan received much-needed British support ahead of the looming Russo-Japanese War. Japan's victory over Russia solidified the alliance, which lasted for two decades, but pressure from the United States and the subsequent Four-Power Treaty of 1921 brought it to an end. Relations deteriorated rapidly during the 1930s due to the Japanese invasion of Manchuria, and the cutoff of oil supplies in 1941 further escalated tensions. Japan declared war in December 1941 and used overwhelming force to seize most British possessions east of the British Raj (present-day India) such as Borneo, Burma, Hong Kong, Malaya, and Singapore. In 1944, British forces repelled the Japanese offensive at Imphal and Kohima, forcing the Japanese to retreat towards Burma.

Beginning in the 1950s, relations between Japan and the United Kingdom improved. In the 1970s, Emperor Hirohito and Queen Elizabeth II paid state visits to each other's countries. The United Kingdom and Japan currently have strong economic ties, with both being members of the G7 and CPTPP. The two are also collaborating in the field of defence, most notably through the GCAP Programme alongside Italy.

== Timeline of relations ==
=== 1500s ===
- 1577. Richard Wylles writes about the people, customs and manners of Giapan in the History of Travel published in London.
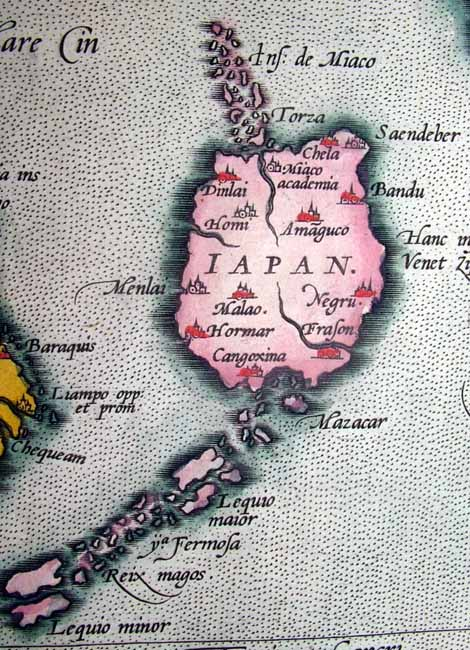
  Mercator based map of Japan (1570)
- 1580. Richard Hakluyt advises the first English merchants to find a new trade route via the Northwest Passage to trade wool for silver with Japan (sending two Barque ships, the George piloted by Arthur Pet and William by Charles Jackman) which returned unsuccessfully by Christmas the same year.
- 1587. Two young Japanese men named Christopher and Cosmas sailed on a Spanish galleon to California, where their ship was captured by Thomas Cavendish. Cavendish brought the two Japanese men with him to England where they spent approximately three years before going again with him on his last expedition to the South Atlantic where they were heading to Japan to begin trade relations. They are the first known Japanese men to have set foot in the British Isles.
- 1593. Richard Hawkins leaves England on board the Dainty in a bid to discover the 'Iſlands of Japan' via the Magellan Strait in 1594, the very route William Adams would take himself in 1599. Hawkins however was captured by the Spanish at Peru, only returning in 1603 after a ransom of £12,000 was paid by his mother for his release.

=== 1600s ===
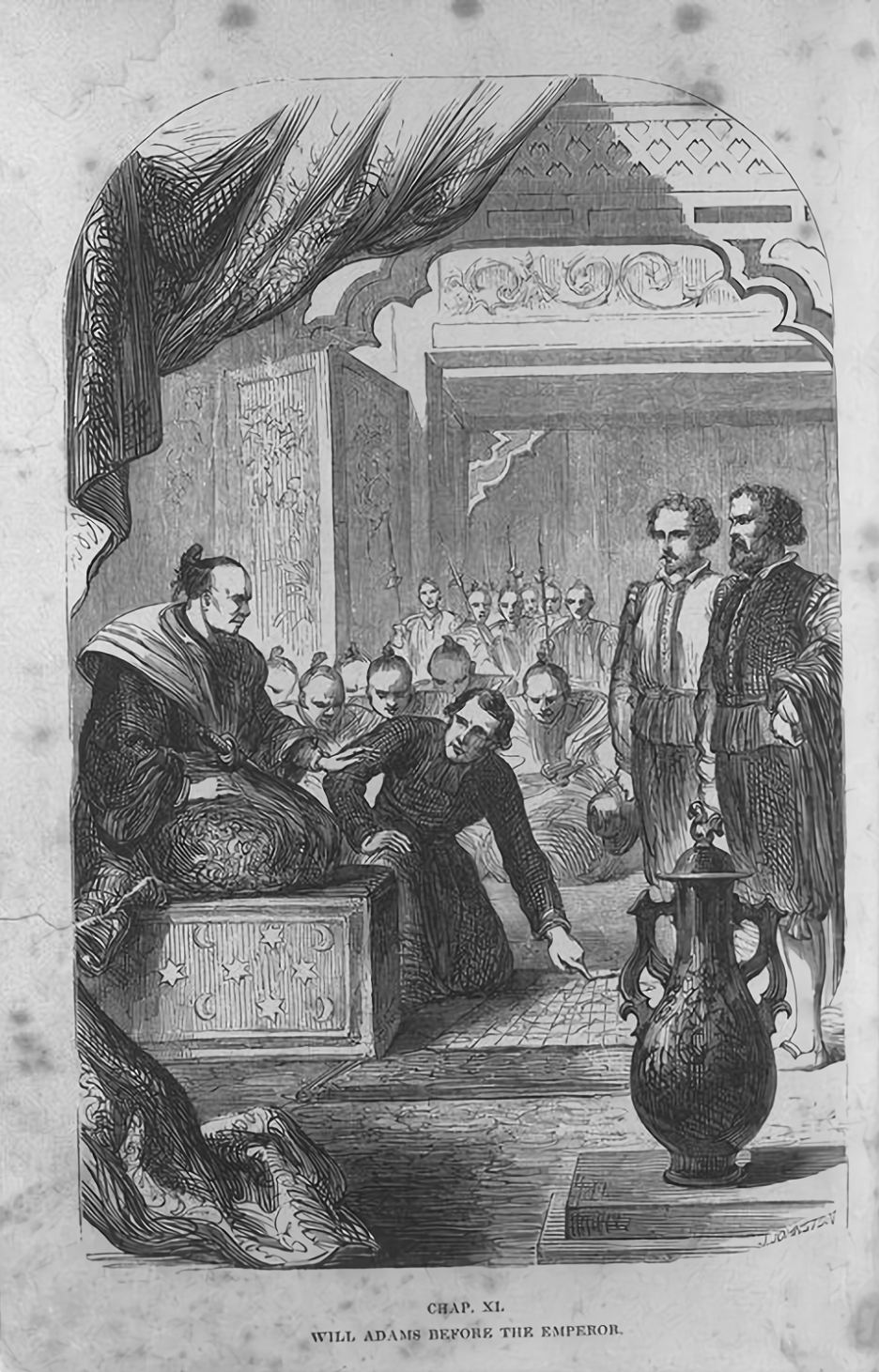
William Adams meets Tokugawa Ieyasu (1564–1620)

- 1600. William Adams, a seaman from Gillingham, Kent, was the first English adventurer to arrive in Japan. Acting as an advisor to the Tokugawa shōgun, he was renamed Miura Anjin, granted a house and land, and spent the rest of his life in his adopted country. He also became one of the first English samurai.
- 1605. The galleon Tiger commanded by Edward Michelborne on a trade expedition to the East Indies is attacked by Japanese pirates off Singapore. They attack the crew, killing the explorer John Davis, but the English fight back eventually wiping out the crew and capture the pirate ship. Only one Japanese pirate survives.

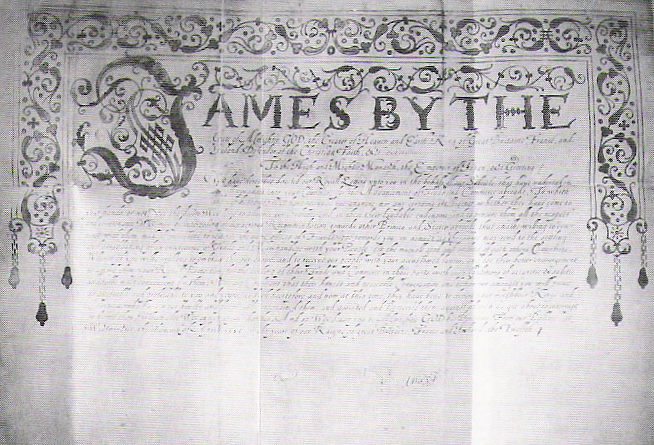
The 1613 letter of King James I remitted to Tokugawa Ieyasu (preserved in the Tokyo University archives)

- 1613. Following an invitation from William Adams in Japan, the English captain John Saris arrived at Hirado Island in the ship Clove with the intent of establishing a trading factory. Adams and Saris travelled to Suruga Province where they met with Tokugawa Ieyasu at his principal residence in September before moving on to Edo where they met Ieyasu's son Hidetada. During that meeting, Hidetada gave Saris two varnished suits of armour for King James I, today housed in the Tower of London. On their way back, they visited Tokugawa once more, who conferred trading privileges on the English through a Red Seal permit giving them "free licence to abide, buy, sell and barter" in Japan. The English party headed back to Hirado Island on 9 October 1613. However, during the ten-year activity of the company between 1613 and 1623, apart from the first ship (Clove in 1613), only three other English ships brought cargoes directly from London to Japan.
- 1623. The Amboyna massacre was perpetrated by the Dutch East India Company. After the incident England closed its commercial base at Hirado Island, now in Nagasaki Prefecture, without notifying Japan. After this, the relationship ended for more than two centuries.
- 1625. A number of documents including the Iaponian Charter, are the first published translated Japanese documents into English by Samuel Purchas.
- 1639. Tokugawa Iemitsu announced his Sakoku policy. Only the Dutch Republic was permitted to retain limited trade rights.
- 1640. Uriemon Eaton the son of William Eaton (a worker at the EIC post in Japan) and Kamezo (a Japanese woman), becomes the first Japanese to join Academia in England as a scholar at Trinity College, Cambridge.

Japan and Kore (1646)

- 1646. Robert Dudley publishes a detailed original map of Japan and Yezo in his Secrets of the Sea treatise, based on the Mercator Projection.
- 1668. 25 February. Henry Oldenburg addresses the Royal Society on the letters of Richard Cocks, particularly noting English trading privileges from the time of Cocks, striking new interest in trade with Japan in England. Based on this new interest, surviving member of the original factory William Eaton (fl.1613-1668), was contacted in order to reopen trade between England and Japan.
- 1670. John Ogilby publishes the first translation of Atlas Japanensis in London, reprinted in 1671 & 1673.
- 1670. The EIC factories are set up at modern day Taiwan (1670–1685) after Koxinqa invites the British to set up a factory.
- 1672. Tongking EIC factory begins operations (along with 'Tywan') with the intention by the British to be used as bases for further trade with Japan.
- 1673. An English ship named Returner visited Nagasaki harbour with factors from the first Hirado factory, and asked for a renewal of trading relations. But the Edo shogunate refused after Dutch prompting. The government cited the withdrawal 50 years earlier, and found it unacceptable that the English king had married the Portuguese Catherine of Braganza, claiming the English to favour the Roman Catholic Church. (cf. ja:リターン号)

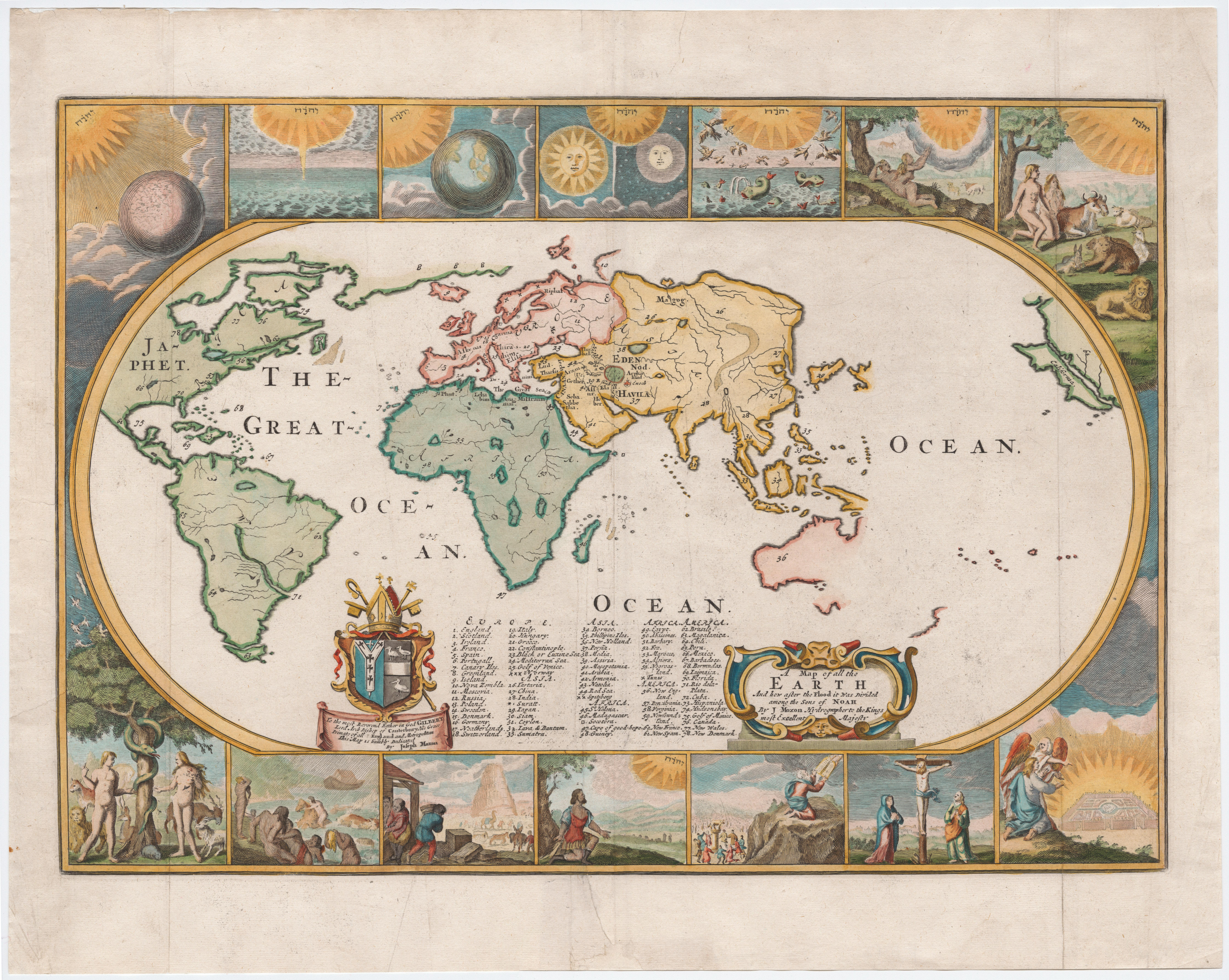
Moxon's 1681 World Map showing Iapan

- 1683. Molly Verney begins learning Japanning as a handicraft in London.

=== 1700s ===
- 1703. James Cunninghame FRS attempts to initiate trade with Japan from Cochinchina and the chaplain James Pound in his service notes of VOC activity in Japan until they are attacked by locals in 1705.
- 1713. Daniel Defoe writes of William Adams and his 'famous voyage to Japan' in his satire Memoirs of Count Tariff.
- 1723-25. Hans Sloane send the English court physician Johann Georg Steigerthal to Lemgo to retrieve Engelbert Kaempfer's East Asian collection for his personal library.
- 1727. Johann Caspar Scheuchzer translates and publishes the first edition of Engelbert Kaempfers History of Japan in London.
- 1731. Arthur Dobbs advocates the finding of the North West Passage to 'be able to send a Squadron of ships, Even to force Japan into a Beneficial Treaty of Commerce with Britain.'
- 1740. Robert Petre, 8th Baron Petre imports the first Camellia japonica into England.
- 1741. The Middleton Expedition is launched to find the Northwest Passage with orders to not engage 'Japanese ships' until the following year should they come across one, with plans halting to trade or settle Japan owing to the circumstances surrounding the Seven Years' War.
- 1745. Thomas Astley reprints by popular demand the Logbook of William Adams in his A New General Collection of Voyages and Travels; in Europe, Asia, Africa and America under Nippon.
- 1753. 50 Japanese objects from the Sloane collection acquired by Kaempfer during his residence in Japan are bequeathed to the British Museum.
- 1791. James Colnett sails HMS Argonaut from Canton to Japan becoming the second unsuccessful attempt at trade with Sakoku Japan.
- 1796. William Robert Broughton surveys the North-western coast of Japan, becoming shipwrecked on the coast of Miyako-jima.

=== 1800s ===
- 1808. The Nagasaki Harbour Incident: HMS Phaeton enters Nagasaki and lays an unsuccessful ambush on Dutch shipping.
- 1812. The British whaler HMS Saracen (1812) stopped at Uraga, Kanagawa and took on water, food, and firewood.
- 1813. Thomas Raffles attempts trade with Japan under a British flag to oust Dutch trade monopoly, only for the ooperhoofd to fly the ships under Dutch colours, being rescinded by Governor-General of India on the basis of excessive expense in 1814, also finally being halted in May 1815 by Raffles after the handover of the British colony of Java to the Dutch.
- 1819. The third British ship 'The Brothers' piloted by Captain Peter Gordon, visited Uraga on 17 June seeking to trade with Japan, unsuccessful at Edo to get any treaty.
- 1819. 3 August. The first British Whaler HMS Syren begins to exploit the Japan whaling grounds.
- 1824. 12 English whalers stray ashore looking for food and are apprehended by Aizawa Seishisai leading to new repulsion acts against foreign vessels.
- 1830. The convict crew of the Cyprus piloted by William Swallow are repelled under the repulsion acts of 1825.
- 1831. Discussions are held at the British East India Company to hold a base on the Bonin Islands to trade with Japan and the Ryukyuu Archipelago.
- 1832. Otokichi, Kyukichi and Iwakichi, castaways from Aichi Prefecture, crossed the Pacific and were shipwrecked on the west coast of North America. The three Japanese men became famous in the Pacific Northwest and probably inspired Ranald MacDonald to go to Japan. They joined a trading ship to the UK, and later Macau. One of them, Otokichi, took British citizenship and adopted the name John Matthew Ottoson. He later made two visits to Japan as an interpreter for the Royal Navy.
- 1840. Indian Oak becomes shipwrecked off the coast of Okinawa and a junk is built by Okinawan peoples for the survivors.
- 1842. On the basis of the British naval victory at the First Opium War, the Repel Edicts are renounced by the Bakufu.
- 1843. Herbert Clifford founds the Loochoo Naval Mission.
- 1850. Bishop Smith arrives at Ryukyu to carry out missionary work.
- 1852. Charles MacFarlane publishes Japan: An Account, Geographical and Historical, from the Earliest Period at which the Islands Composing this Empire Were Known to Europeans, Down to the Present Time, and the Expedition fitted out in the United States, which surmises all known European accounts of Japan and travels to Japan before the Ansei Treaties.
- 1854. 14 October. The first limited Anglo-Japanese Friendship Treaty was signed by Admiral Sir James Stirling and representatives of the Tokugawa shogunate (Bakufu).
- 1855. In an effort to find the Russian fleet in the Pacific Ocean during the Crimean War, a French-British naval force reached the port of Hakodate, which was open to British ships as a result of the Friendship Treaty of 1854, and sailed further north, seizing the Russian-American Company's possessions on the island of Urup in the Kuril archipelago. The Treaty of Paris (1856) restitutes the island to Russia.
- 1858. 26 August. The Anglo-Japanese Treaty of Amity and Commerce was signed by the Scotsman Lord Elgin and representatives of the Tokugawa shogunate for Japan, after the Harris Treaty was concluded. Britain obtained extraterritorial rights on Japanese with the British Supreme Court for China and Japan, in Shanghai. A British iron paddle schooner named Enpiroru was presented to the Tokugawa administration by Bruce as a present for the Emperor from Queen Victoria.
- 1859. Merchant Thomas Blake Glover arrives in Japan via China.
- 1861. The Tsushima Incident occurs which sees the British repel a Russian naval vessel from invading Tsushima on request from the Bakufu.
- 1861. 5 July. The British legation in Edo was attacked.

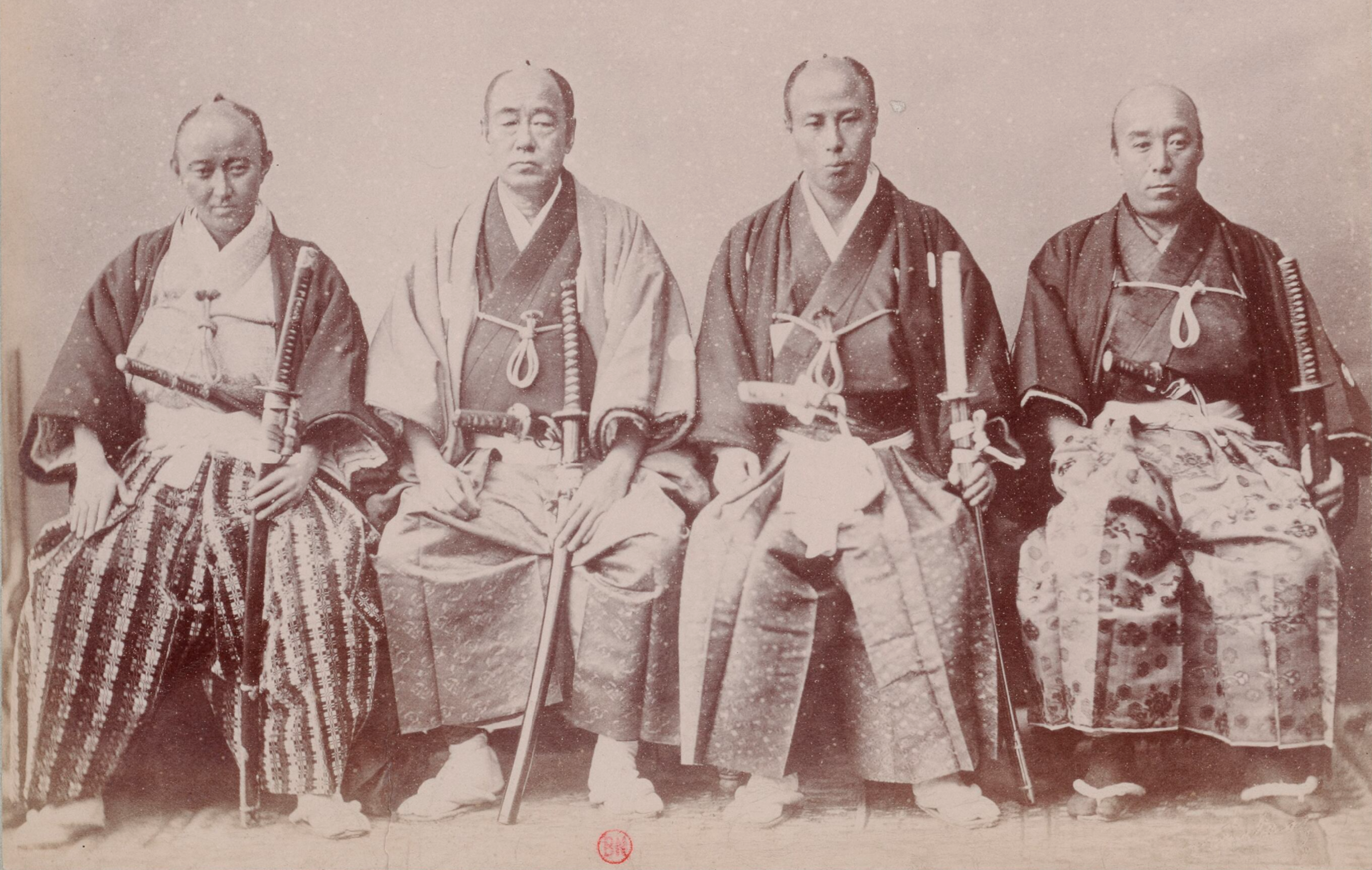
The First Japanese Embassy to Europe, in 1862

- 1862. The shōgun sends the First Japanese Embassy to Europe, led by Takenouchi Yasunori.
- 1862. 14 September. The Namamugi Incident occurred within a week of the arrival of Ernest Satow in Japan.
- 1862–75. British Military Garrison established at Yamate, Yokohama.
- 1863. The Chōshū Five began their education at University College London under the guidance of Professor Alexander William Williamson.
- 1863. Bombardment of Kagoshima by the Royal Navy. (Anglo-Satsuma War).
- 1864. Bombardment of Shimonoseki by Britain, France, the Netherlands and the United States.
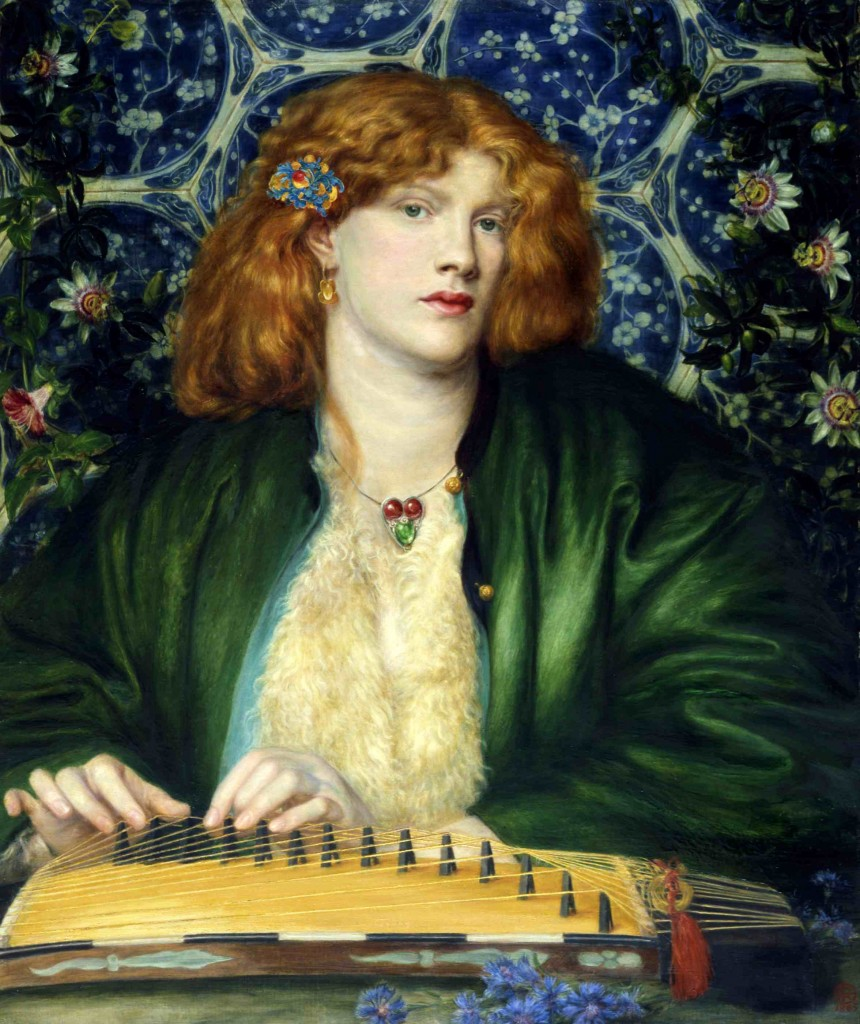
  The Blue Bower (1865) by Dante Gabriel Rossetti, the model poses with a Koto.
- 1865. With the influx of Japanese imports, artists such as Dante Gabriel Rossetti and Walter Crane began to be influenced by Japanese objects and Ukiyo-e prints.
- 1865. The Hong Kong and Shanghai Bank (HSBC) from Britain was established in Hong Kong.
- 1865. Chōshū Domain bought the warship Union from Glover and Co., an agency of Jardine Matheson established in Nagasaki, in the name of Satsuma Domain which was not against the Tokugawa shogunate then.
- 1866 HSBC established a Japanese branch in Yokohama.
- 1867. The Icarus affair, an incident involving the murder of two British sailors in Nagasaki, leading to increased diplomatic tensions between Britain and the Tokugawa shogunate.
- 1868. Satchō Alliance by Chōshū Domain and Satsuma Domain achieved the Meiji Restoration, whereby Sakamoto Ryoma utilised British contacts to procure military and naval equipment
- 1868. Sites like the Kawaguchi foreign settlement began accepting British land-buyers
- 1869. Alfred, Duke of Edinburgh becomes the first European prince to visit Japan arriving on HMS Galatea on 4 September 1869. Audience with the Emperor Meiji in Tokyo.
- 1872. The Iwakura mission visited Britain as part of a diplomatic and investigative tour of the United States and Europe.
- 1873. The Imperial College of Engineering opened with Henry Dyer as principal.

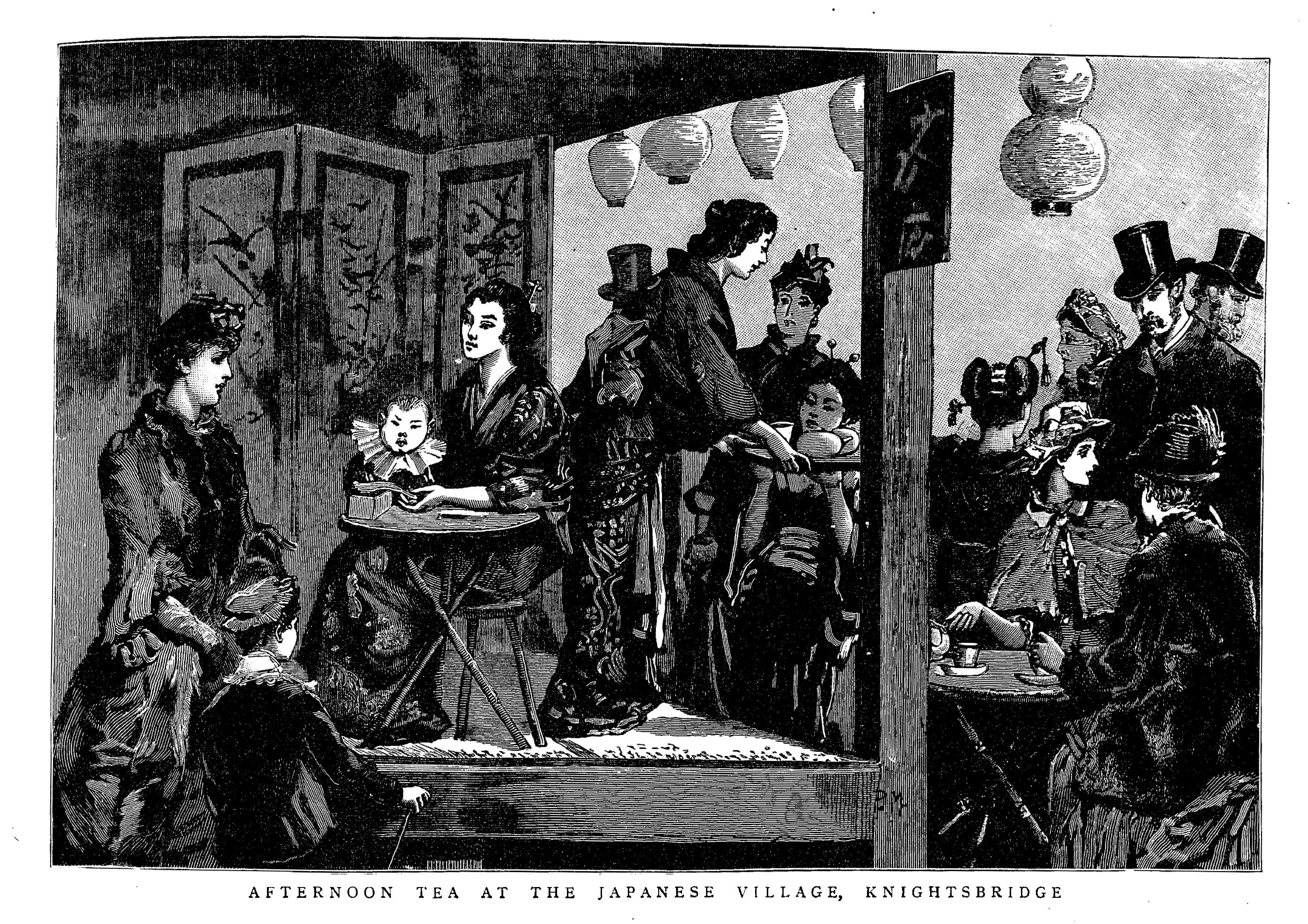
Japanese Village in Knightsbridge, 1886

- 1879. British Court for Japan was established in Yokohama.
- 1880. Japan government established Yokohama Specie Bank for only foreign transaction bank in Japan, with the support of HSBC.
- 1881. Azusa Ono suggests using the British model for the new Japanese constitution.
- 1886. Normanton incident British merchant vessel sinks off the coast of Wakayama Prefecture. Crew escape while 25 Japanese passengers perish. Widespread Japanese public outrage as subsequent Board of Enquiry under extraterritorial court finds the crew not guilty. The case is later reopened, and the crew are given three month sentences.
- 1885–87. Japanese exhibition at Knightsbridge, London.
- 1887–89. Jurist Francis Taylor Piggott, the son of ex-MP Jasper Wilson Johns, was inaugurated as a legislational consultant for Itō Hirobumi, then and the first Prime Minister of Japan.
- 1890. Government of Japan established the Constitution of Imperial Japan which House of Peers was not come with Universal suffrage.
- 1891. The Japan Society of London is founded by Arthur Diosy.
- 1894. The Anglo-Japanese Treaty of Commerce and Navigation was signed in London on 16 July. The treaty abolished extraterritoriality in Japan for British subjects with effect from 17 July 1899.
- 1899. Extraterritorial rights for British subjects in Japan came to an end.

=== 1900s ===
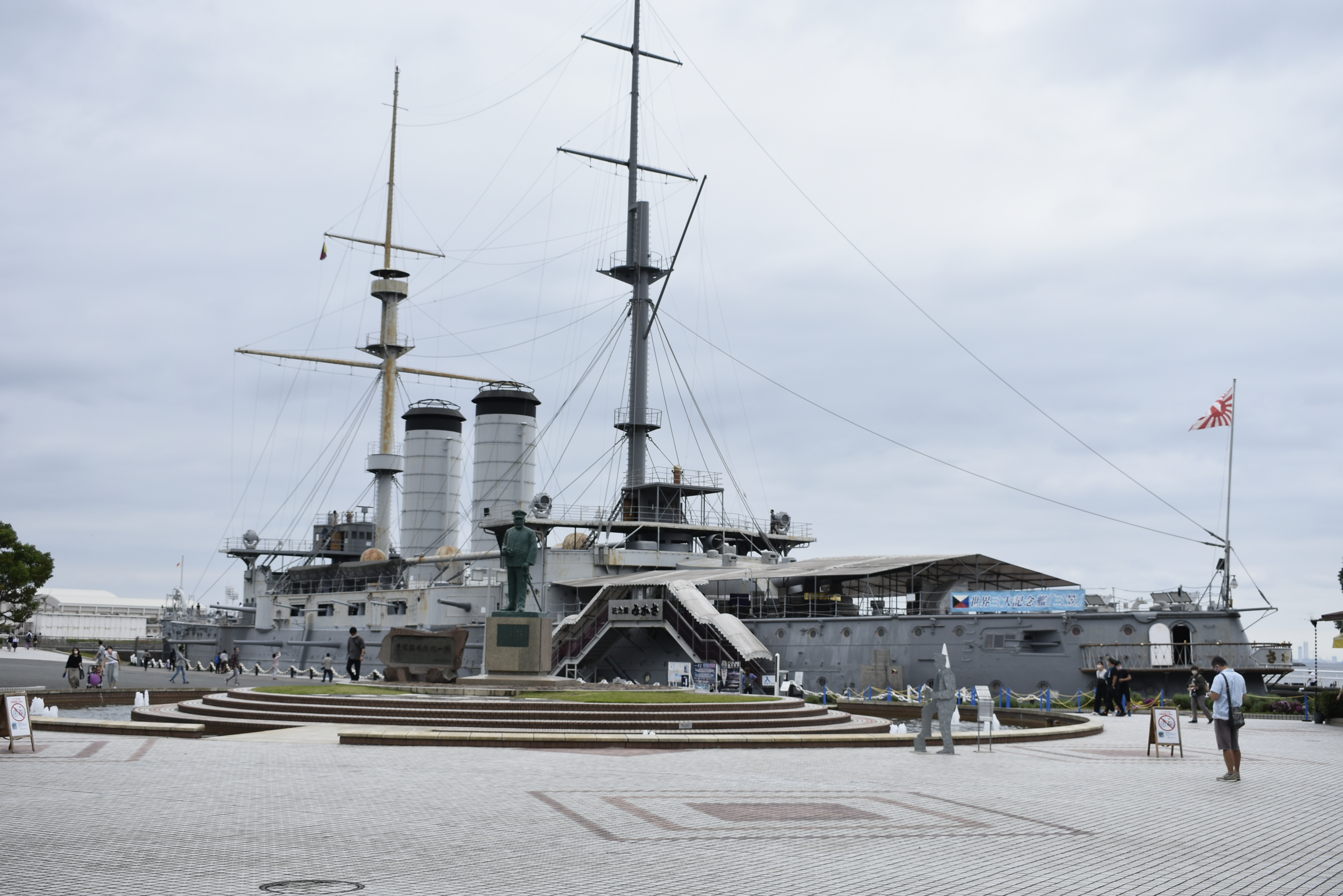
Mikasa, the flagship of the Japanese Navy during the Russo-Japanese War, was built at Vickers, Sons & Maxim and is the only remaining example of a British-built battleship in the world.

- 1900. (January). Last sitting of the British Court for Japan.
- 1902. The Japanese–British alliance was signed in London on 30 January. It was a diplomatic milestone that saw an end to Britain's splendid isolation, and removed the need for Britain to build up its navy in the Pacific.
- 1904-05. Russo-Japanese War: although neutral, Britain gave crucial assistance to Japan throughout the war. This included vital intelligence, assistance with ship design, coaling facilities and maritime logistics. The Japanese battleships Mikasa, Shikishima, Fuji and Asahi were all built in Britain.
- 1905. The Japanese–British alliance was renewed and expanded. Official diplomatic relations were upgraded, with ambassadors being exchanged for the first time.
- 1907. In July, British thread company J. & P. Coats launched Teikoku Seishi and began to thrive.
- 1908. The Japan-British Society was founded in order to foster cultural and social understanding.
- 1909. Fushimi Sadanaru returns to Britain to convey the thanks of the Japanese government for British advice and assistance during the Russo-Japanese War.

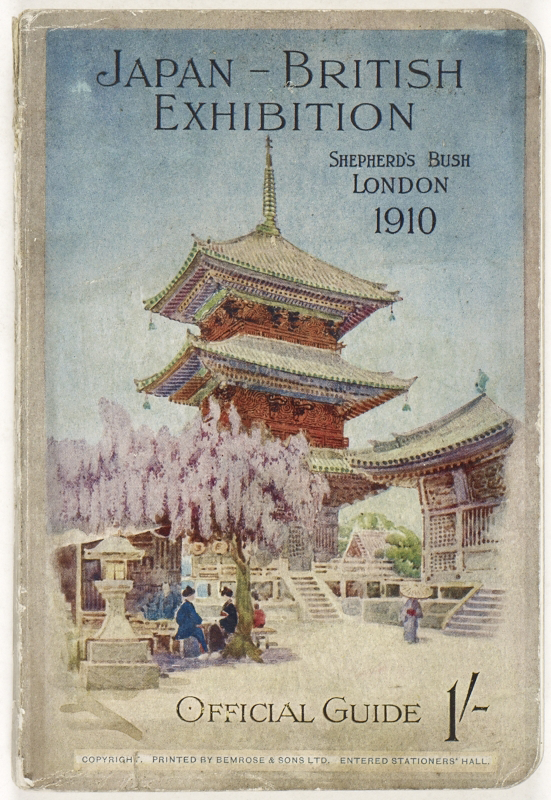
Guide to the Japan–British Exhibition of 1910

- 1910. Sadanaru represents Japan at the state funeral of Edward VII, and meets the new king George V at Buckingham Palace.
- 1910. The Japan–British Exhibition is held at Shepherd's Bush in London. Japan made a successful effort to display its new status as a great power by emphasizing its new role as a colonial power in Asia.
- 1911. The Japanese – British alliance was renewed with approval of the quasi-independent dominions (i.e. at the time, Australia, Canada, New Zealand, Newfoundland and South Africa).
- 1913. The IJN Kongō, the last of the British-built warships for Japan's navy, enters service.
- 1914–1915. Japan joined World War I as Britain's ally under the terms of the alliance and captured German-occupied Tsingtao (Qingdao) in China Mainland. They also help Australia and New Zealand capture archipelagos like the Marshall Islands and the Mariana Islands.

A First World War postcard titled Pals, depicting two boys with British and Japanese flags to symbolise the Anglo-Japanese Alliance (c. 1914–1918).

- 1915. The Twenty-One Demands would have given Japan varying degrees of control over all of China, and would have prohibited European powers from extending their influence in China any further. It is eventually scrapped.
- 1917. The Imperial Japanese Navy helps the Royal Navy and allied navies patrol the Mediterranean against Central Powers ships.
- 1917–1935. Close relations between the two countries steadily worsen.
- 1919. Japan proposes a racial equality clause in negotiations to form the League of Nations, calling for "making no distinction, either in law or in fact, on account of their race or nationality." Britain, which supports the racially discriminatory laws in the dominions, such as the White Australia policy, cannot assent, and the proposal is rejected.
- 1921. Britain indicates it will not renew the Anglo-Japanese Alliance of 1902 primarily because of opposition from the United States and also Canada.
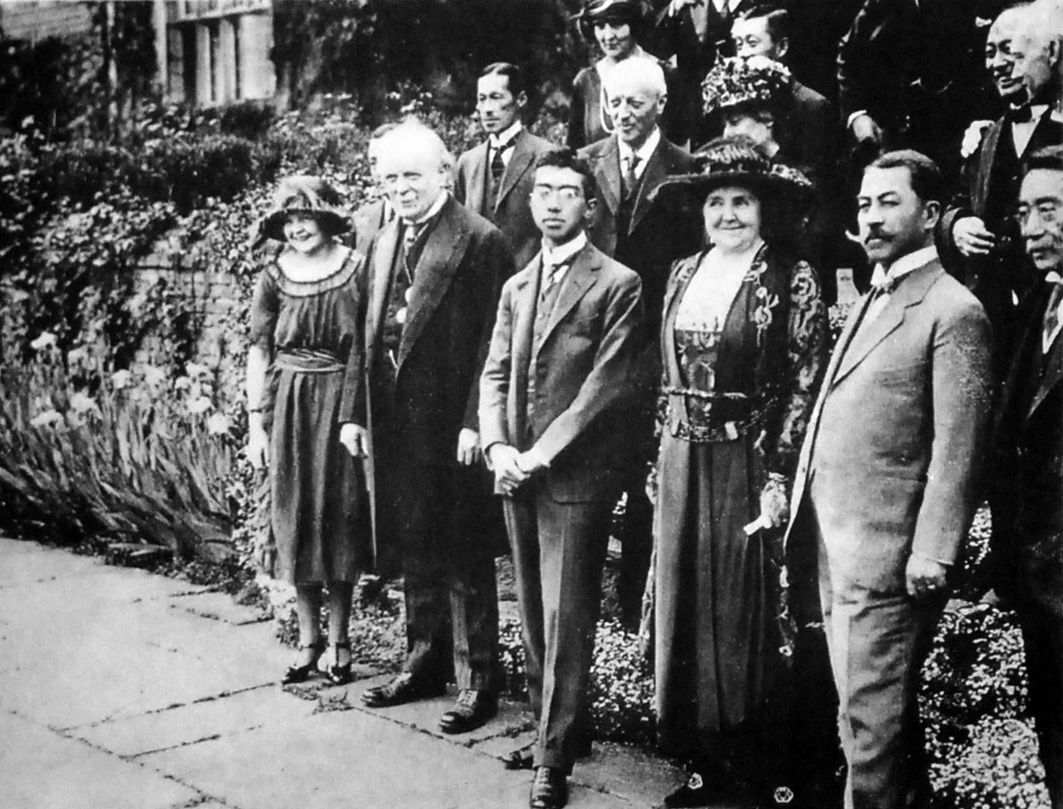
- Crown Prince Hirohito and Lloyd George, England, 1921
  1921. Crown Prince Hirohito visited Britain and other Western European countries. It was the first time that a Japanese crown prince had travelled overseas.
- 1921. Arrival in September of the Sempill Mission in Japan, a British technical mission for the development of Japanese Aero-naval forces. It provided the Japanese with flying lessons and advice on building aircraft carriers; the British aviation experts kept close watch on Japan after that.
- 1922. Washington Naval Conference concluding in the Four-Power Treaty, Five-Power Treaty, and Nine-Power Treaty; major naval disarmament for 10 years with sharp reduction of Royal Navy & Imperial Navy. The Treaties specify that the relative naval strengths of the major powers are to be UK = 5, US = 5, Japan = 3, France = 1.75, Italy = 1.75. The powers will abide by the treaty for ten years, then begin a naval arms race.
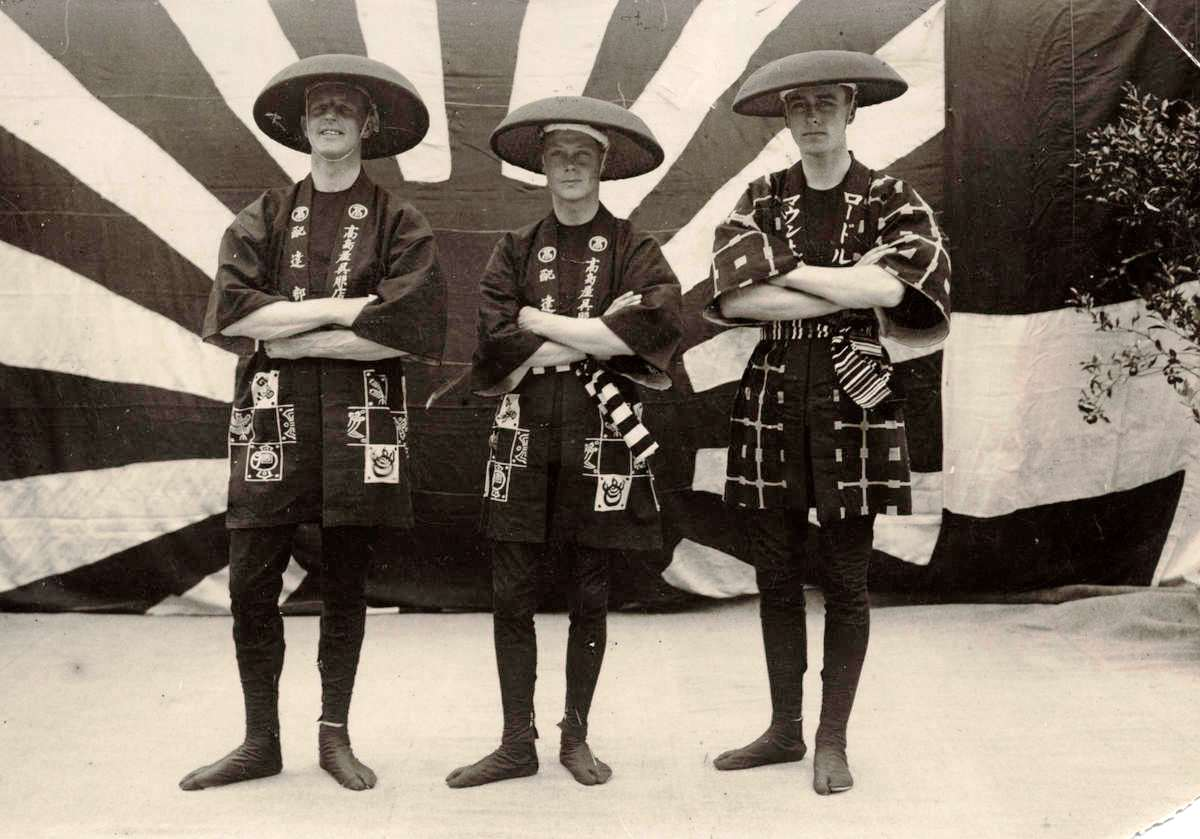
- Edward, Prince of Wales and Lord Mountbatten wearing Japanese costumes at a Takashimaya during their visit to Japan in 1922
  1922. Edward, Prince of Wales travelling on HMS Renown, arrives in Yokohama on 12 April for a four-week official visit to Japan.
- 1923. The Japanese-British alliance was officially discontinued on 17 August in response to U.S. and Canadian pressure.
- 1930. The London disarmament conference angers Japanese Army and Navy. Japan's navy demanded parity with the United States and Britain, but was rejected; it maintained the existing ratios and Japan was required to scrap a capital ship. Extremists assassinate Japan's prime minister, and the military takes more power.
- 1931. September. Japanese Army seizes control of Manchuria, which China has not controlled in decades. It sets up a puppet government. Britain and France effectively control the League of Nations, which issues the Lytton Report in 1932, saying that Japan had genuine grievances, but it acted illegally in seizing the entire province. Japan quits the League, Britain takes no action.
- 1934. The Royal Navy sends ships to Tokyo to take part in a naval parade in honour of the late Admiral Tōgō Heihachirō, one of Japan's greatest naval heroes, the "Nelson of the East".
- 1937. The Kamikaze, a prototype of the Mitsubishi Ki-15, travels from Tokyo to London, the first Japanese-built aircraft to land in Europe, for the coronation of George VI and Elizabeth. Prince and Princess Chichibu represent Japan at the coronation.
- 1938 Yokohama Specie Bank acquired HSBC.
- 1939. The Tientsin Incident almost causes an Anglo-Japanese war when the Japanese blockade the British concession in Tientsin, China.
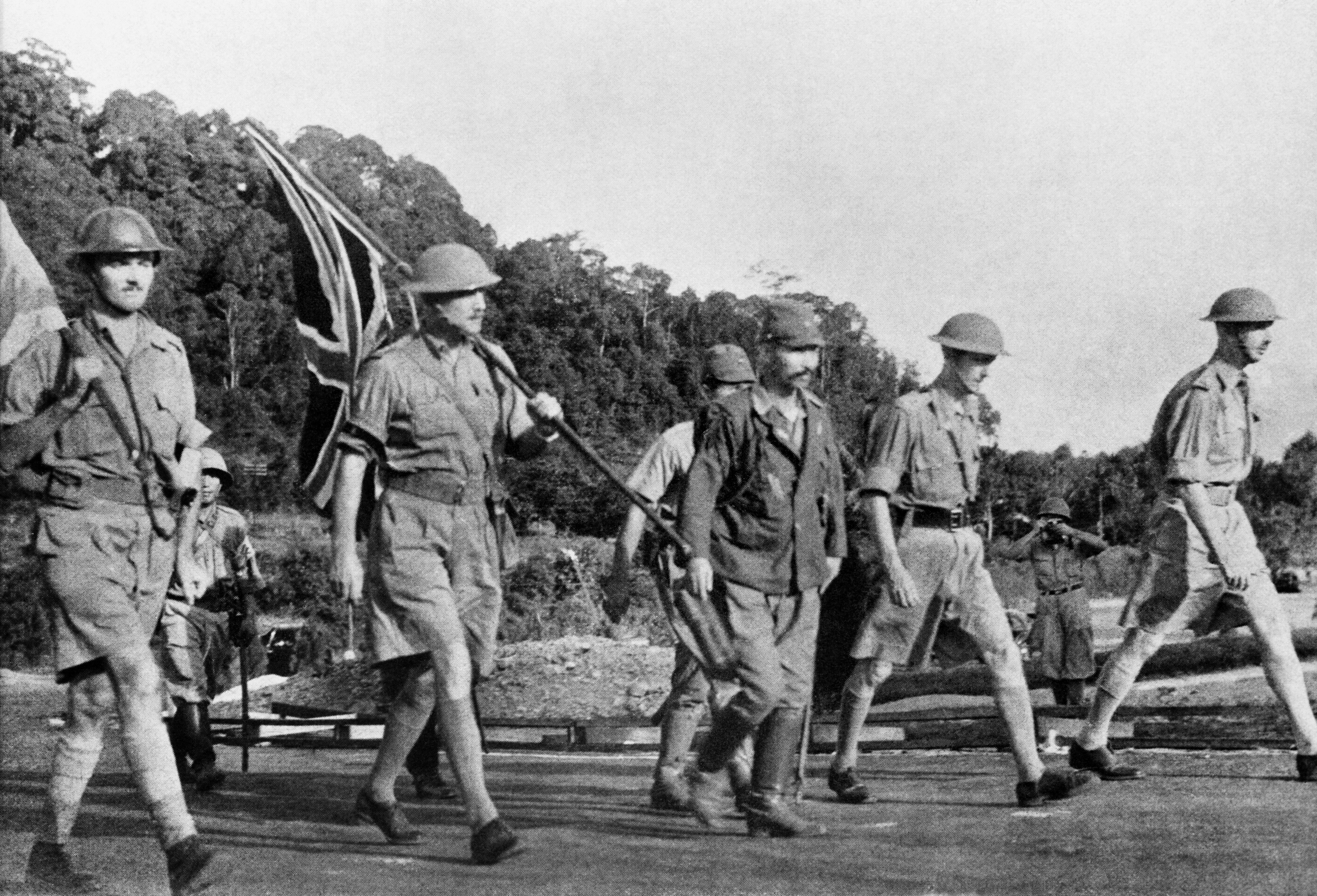
- Lieutenant-General Percival and his party on their way to surrender Singapore to the Japanese
  1941. 7/8 December.The Pacific War begins as Japan attacks British colonial territories in the Far East.
- 1941–42. In the first few months of war Japanese forces race from victory to victory. They capture Hong Kong, British Borneo, Malaya, Singapore and Burma.
- The surrender of Singapore is a major defeat for the British; over hundred thousand British and Commonwealth soldiers become prisoners of war. Many British and Commonwealth POWs die in very harsh conditions of captivity.
- 1944. The Japanese invasion of British India via Burma ends in disaster. The resulting battles of Imphal and Kohima becomes the worst defeat on land to that date in Japanese history.
- 1945. August. The last significant land battle of the Second World War took place during the British reconquest of Burma – a failed Japanese breakout attempt in the Pegu Yomas.

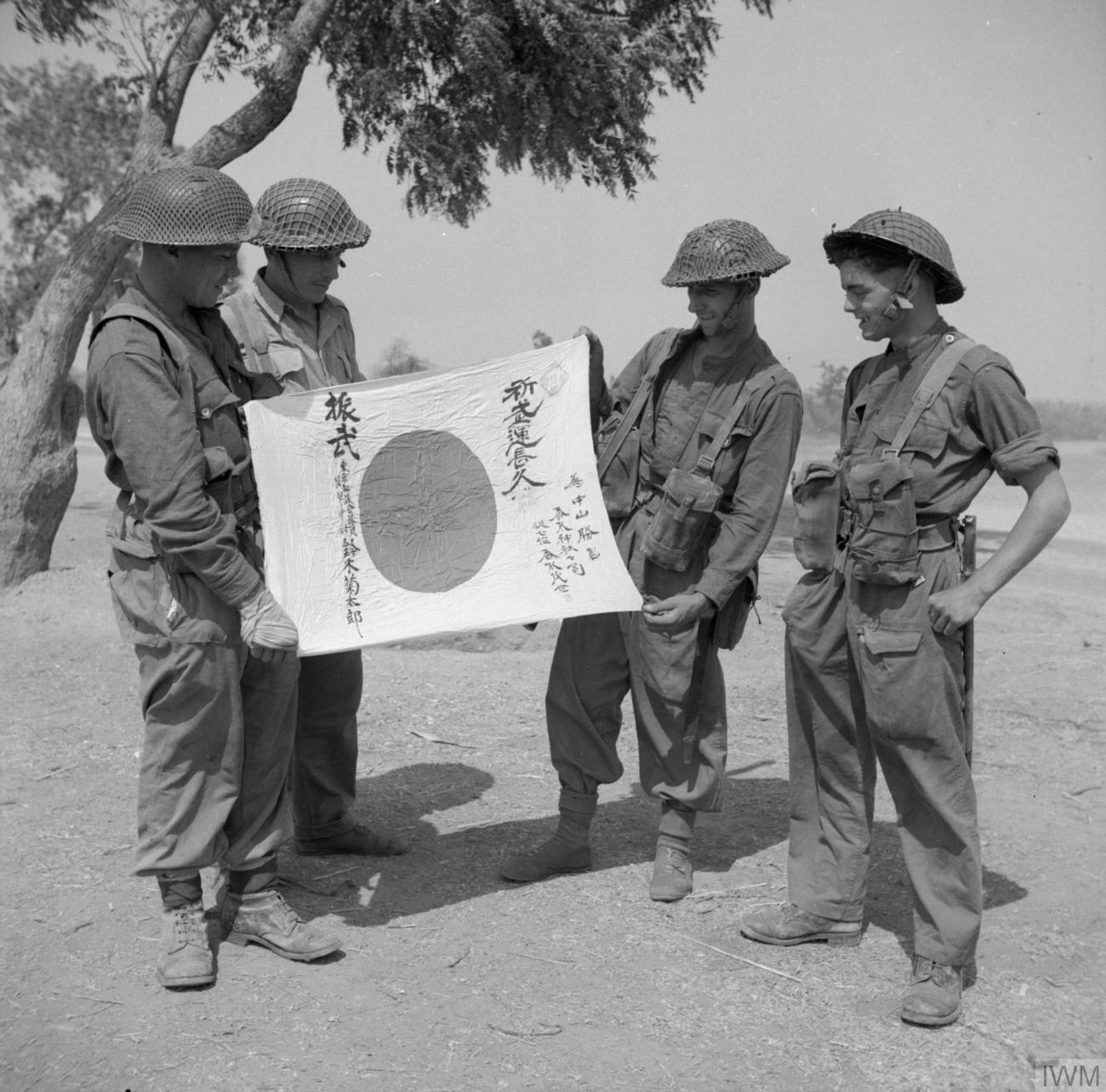
British troops display a Japanese flag captured during the Burma campaign, April 1945.

- 1945. 2 September. Aboard the USS Missouri in Tokyo Bay, Admiral Bruce Fraser is among the allied commanders formally accepting the surrender of Japan
- 1945–46. British troops deploy Japanese Surrendered Personnel during Operation Masterdom and the Indonesian Revolution in French Indochina and the Dutch East Indies respectively. A battalion commander, Major Kido is recommended by General Philip Christison for a DSO.
- 1945–1952. Japan comes under allied occupation. The British Commonwealth Force occupy the western prefectures of Shimane, Yamaguchi, Tottori, Okayama and Hiroshima and the territory of Shikoku Island. In 1951, this becomes the British Commonwealth Forces Korea with the commencement of the Korean War.
- 1948. The 1948 Summer Olympics was held in London. Japan did not participate.
- 1952. Treaty of San Francisco – the peace treaty in which Anglo-Japanese relations were normalized. The Japanese government accepts the judgements of the Tokyo War Crimes Tribunal. According to Peter Lowe, the British were still angry over the humiliation of the surrender of Singapore in 1942; resentment at American domination of the occupation of Japan; apprehension concerning renewed Japanese competition in textiles and shipbuilding; and bitterness regarding Japanese atrocities against British prisoners of war.
- 1953. Nineteen-year-old Crown Prince Akihito (Emperor from 1989 to 2019), represents Japan at the coronation of Queen Elizabeth II.
- 1953. The British Council in Japan was established.
- 1957. Japanese Prime Minister Nobusuke Kishi decided to compensate the government of France and Banque de l'Indochine in pound sterling.
- 1963. The University of Oxford set Japanese as a subject in its Oriental Institute (the Sub-Faculty of East Asian Studies).

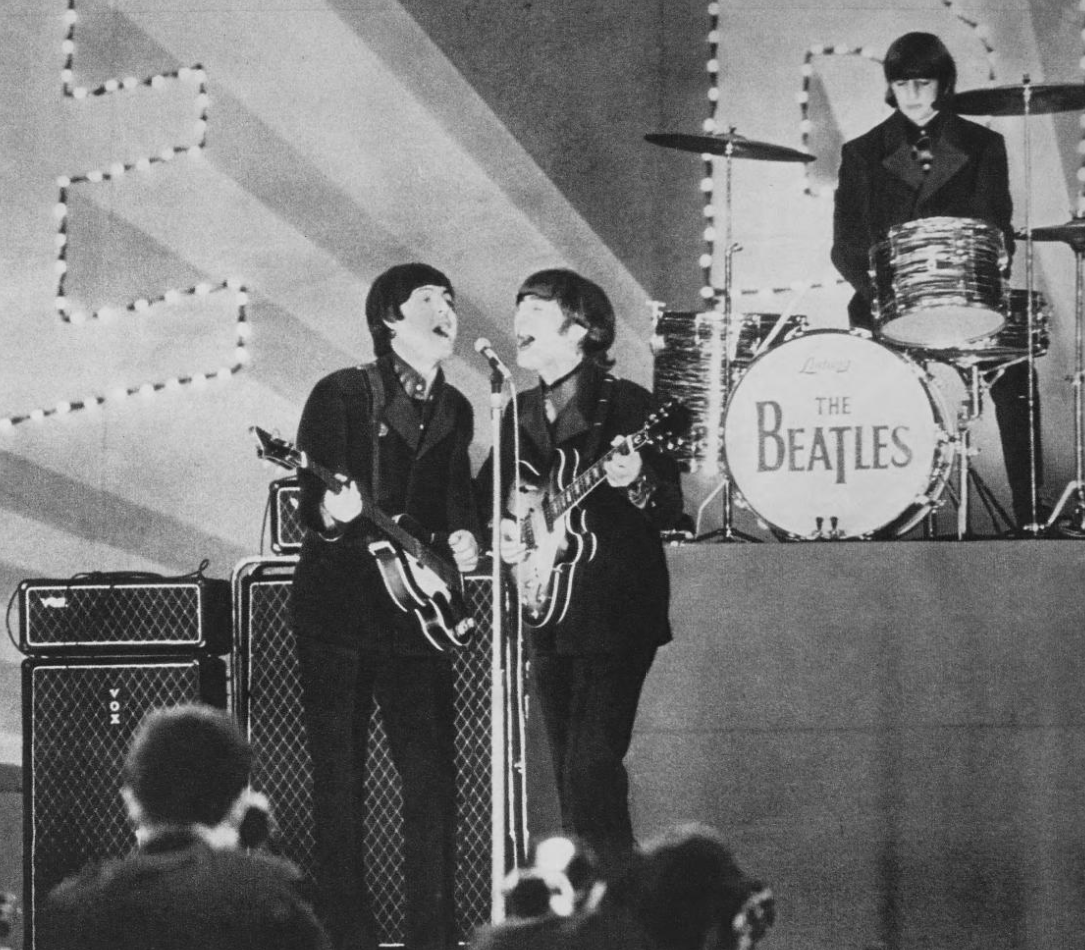
The Beatles performing at the Nippon Budokan 1966

- 1966. The Beatles played at Nippon Budokan in Tokyo to overwhelming adulation. This performance emphasized growing good will between Britain and Japan in their foreign relations policies.
- 1966. Tōkai Nuclear Power Plant utilising the Magnox design becomes operational
- 1971. Emperor Hirohito and Empress Nagako pay a state visit to the United Kingdom after an interval of 50 years as Crown Prince of Japan.
- 1975. Queen Elizabeth II and Prince Philip, Duke of Edinburgh pay a state visit to Japan.
- 1978. Beginning of the BET scheme (British Exchange Teaching Programme) first advocated by Nicholas MacLean.
- 1980s. The British-Japanese Parliamentary Group was established in Britain in the early 1980s.
- 1983. Naruhito (Emperor of Japan from 2019 onwards) studied at Merton College, Oxford, until 1985, and researched transport on the River Thames.
- 1985. Japan wins the bid for work on Turkey's Bosphorous Bridge over the UK's competing bid. UK Prime Minister Margaret Thatcher states that it is a "bitter blow" that the UK market is open to Japan, resulting in good profits for Japan and its ability to provide larger credit for international projects than the UK can.
- 1986. Nissan Motors began to operate its car plant in Sunderland, as Nissan Motor Manufacturing (UK) Ltd.
- 1986. Charles, Prince of Wales (King Charles III of the United Kingdom since 2022) and Diana, Princess of Wales conducted a successful royal visit.
- 1987. JET (Japan Exchange and Teaching) program starts when the BET scheme and the Fulbright scholarship are merged.
- 1988. The Daiwa Anglo-Japanese Foundation established.
- 1990. The Alumni Association for British JET Participants JETAA UK is established.
- 1991. The first Sumo tournament to be held outside Japan is hosted at the Royal Albert Hall in London.
- 1992. Toyota Motors began to operate its car plant at Burnaston near Derby.
- 1993. Helen McCarthy becomes the first English-speaking author to write a book about anime, and begins cataloguing the anime fandom in the UK.
- 1998. Emperor Akihito and Empress Michiko pay a state visit to the United Kingdom.

=== 2000s ===
- 2001. The year-long "Japan 2001" cultural-exchange project saw a major series of Japanese cultural, educational and sporting events held around the UK.
- 2001. JR West gifts a 0 Series Shinkansen (No. 22-141) to the National Railway Museum at York, it is the only one of its type to be preserved outside Japan.

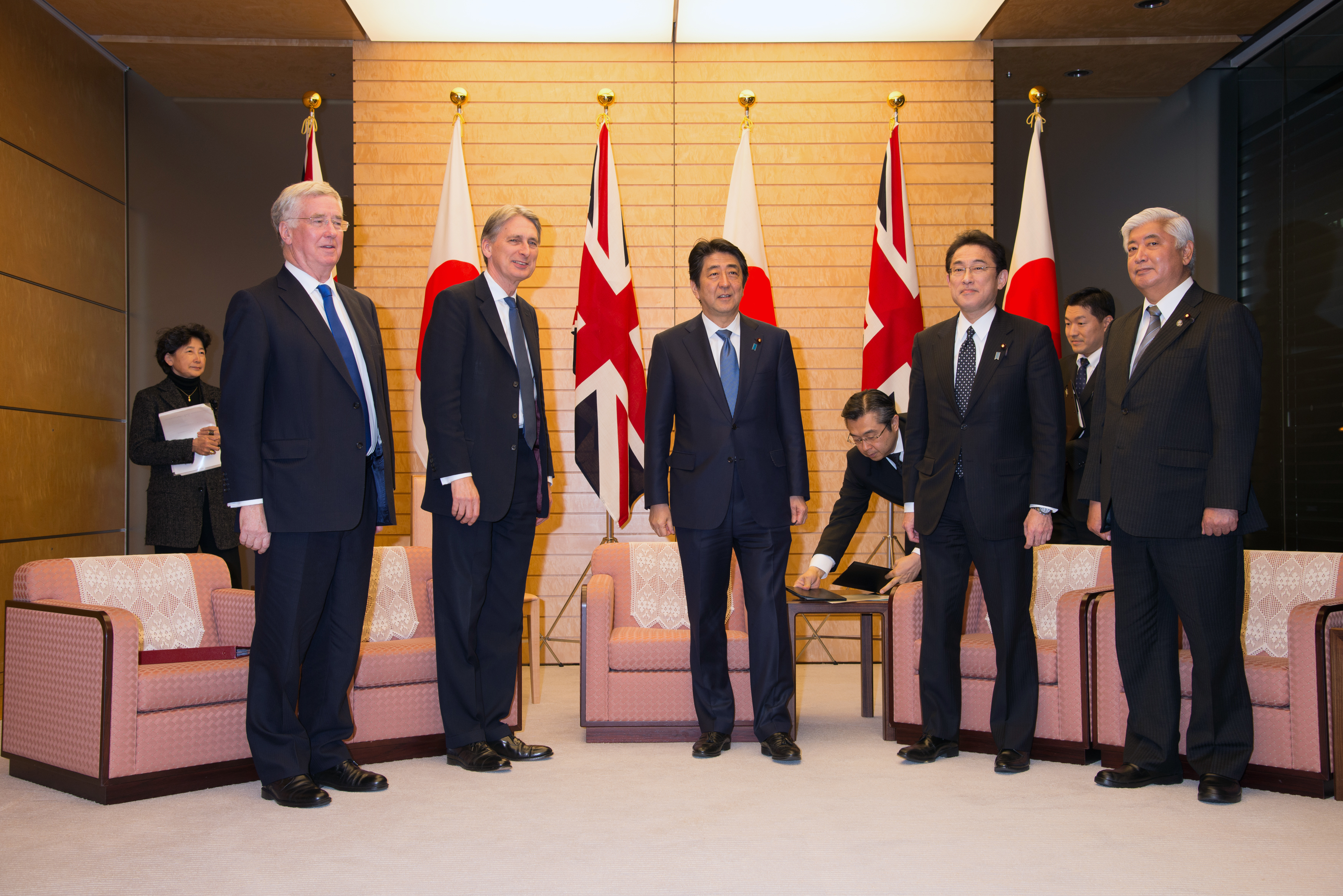
Second Japan-UK Foreign and Defence Ministerial Meeting on 8 January 2016 in Tokyo

- 2007. The consulates in Fukuoka and Nagoya complete their closing with all representation to Western Japan consolidated at the British Consulate-General in Osaka.
- Prince Charles and Camilla, Duchess of Cornwall, visited Japan from October 27 to October 31, 2008. The 5-day trip marked the 150th anniversary of diplomatic relations between the United Kingdom and Japan.
- 2011. UK sends over rescue men with rescue dogs and supplies to help the Japanese, after the 11 March 2011 Tōhoku earthquake and tsunami.
- 2012. A UK trade delegation to Japan, led by Prime Minister David Cameron, announces an agreement to jointly develop weapons systems.
- 2012. The 2012 Summer Olympics are held in London. Japan takes part for the first time, and its team comes home with 38 medals, seven of them gold.
- 2012. Emperor Akihito and Empress Michiko pay their second state visit to the United Kingdom for the Diamond Jubilee of Elizabeth II.
- February 2015. Prince William, Duke of Cambridge on an official visit tours areas devastated by the 2011 Tsunami including Fukushima, Ishinomaki, and Onagawa.
- September 2016. Citing concerns for Japanese owned business operating in the United Kingdom in the wake of the European Union membership referendum, the Japanese Ministry of Foreign Affairs directly issues a 15-page memorandum on its own website requesting that the British Government strike a Brexit agreement safeguarding UK's current trading rights in the European Single Market.
- December 2018. A new trade deal between Japan and the European Union which is hoped could also act as blue-print for post-Brexit trade between Japan and the UK was approved by the European Parliament.
- September 2020. The UK and Japan agree with a free trade agreement — the first FTA made by the UK since leaving the European Union.
- May 2022. UK Prime Minister Boris Johnson and Japanese Prime Minister Fumio Kishida meet in-person in Downing Street and sign a Reciprocal Access Agreement. The agreement, which was made in response to the Russian invasion of Ukraine and China's rise in Indo-Pacific region, seeks to expand joint military exercises and increase working together for disaster relief. It also hopes to make nations who are allies of the UK and Japan less dependent on oil and gas exported from Russia.
- June 2022. The JS Kashima made a port call in London as part of an exchange event between Japan and Britain and to commemorate the 120th anniversary of the Anglo-Japanese Alliance.
- September 2022. Emperor Naruhito and Empress Masako represent Japan at the state funeral of Queen Elizabeth II on their first visit abroad as emperor and empress consort.
- December 2022. Japan, the UK, Italy, sign an agreement to create the Global Combat Air Programme, with its first jets to be produced by 2035. The programme is about "merging the three nations' costly existing research into new aerial war technology, from stealth capacity to high-tech sensors".
- January 2023. On 11 January Japanese Prime Minister Fumio Kishida and UK Prime Minister Rishi Sunak signed a defence pact during Kishida's visit to London that will allow both nations to deploy troops in each other's countries. The UK will be the first European country to have such a reciprocal access agreement with Japan, with the UK Government describing the pact as the most important of its type since the 1902 Anglo-Japanese Alliance. The pact was signed at the Tower of London, where Prime Ministers Kishida and Sunak saw the Japanese armour given to King James VI and I in 1613 by the Shogun Tokugawa Hidetada of Japan to mark the first-ever trade agreement between the two countries. They also discussed the UK's membership in the CPTPP.
- May 2023. Crown Prince and Crown Princess Akishino represent Japan at the coronation of Charles III and Camilla. One day before the 49th G7 summit, the two leaders issued The Hiroshima Accord: An Enhanced Japan-UK Global Strategic Partnership.
- July 2023. Britain signed the agreement to accede to the Comprehensive and Progressive Agreement for Trans-Pacific Partnership.
- In June 2024, Emperor Naruhito and Empress Masako paid a state visit to the United Kingdom and were formally received by King Charles III and Queen Camilla.
- In September 2025, the Duke and Duchess of Edinburgh visited Japan, celebrating the strong bilateral relationship between the UK and Japan.

See also the chronology on the website of British Embassy, Tokyo.

== Britons in Japan ==
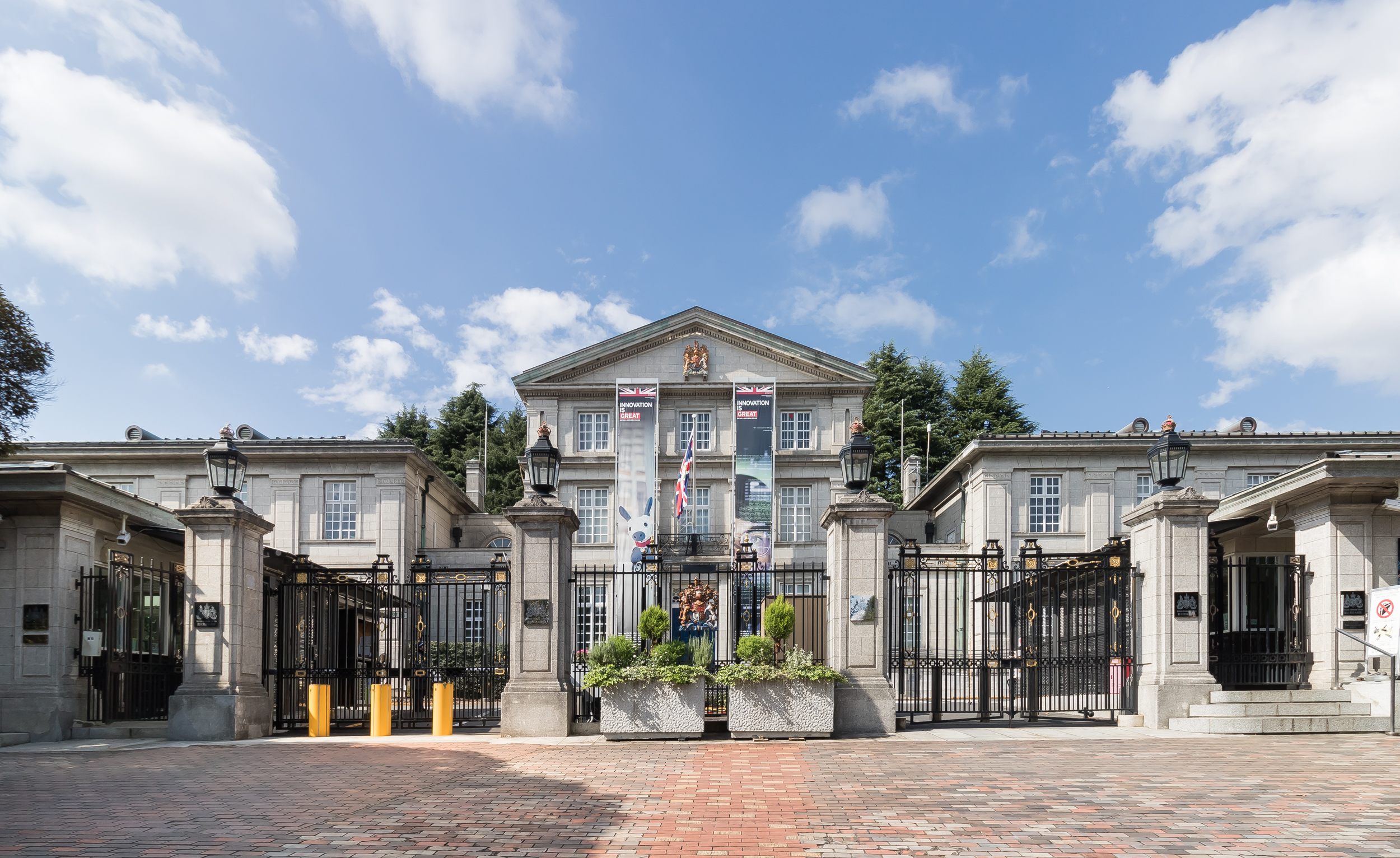
Embassy of the United Kingdom, Tokyo

- William Adams (Miura Anjin) - Hatamoto and advisor to the Shogun Tokugawa Ieyasu
- Arthur Adams - zoologist who studied Japanese sealife onboard HMS Samarang in 1845
- Rutherford Alcock - British diplomat to Japan from 1858 to 1864 and the first 'outsider' to climb Mount Fuji in 1860
- Anna d'Almeida - first female British travel writer to have visited Japan in 1862, not the first known female writer on Japan however, that being the translator Mary Margaret Busk in 1841
- William Anderson - a prominent collector who donated to the British Museum
- Edwin Arnold - Author of The Light of Asia, visited Japan in 1889 and married Lady Tama Kurokawa
- William George Aston - consular official and japanologist
- Matilda Chaplin Ayrton - scholar and founder of a Midwife Hospital between 1873 and 1875 in Japan
- William Edward Ayrton - professor of physics and telegraphy at the Imperial College of Engineering, introduced the Arc Lamp to Japan in 1878
- Michael Buckworth Bailey - first Anglican consular staff from 1862 to 1874
- Thomas Baty - legal advisor to the Empire of Japan
- John Batchelor - Anglican missionary specialist on the Ainu
- Felice Beato - British/Italian/Corfiote photographer
- Edward Bickersteth - first Anglican bishop of South Tokyo
- Isabella Bird - Victorian traveller and author
- John Reddie Black - publisher of newspapers, principally The Far East, which issued photos by Suzuki Shin'ichi I in 1873 to 1874
- Carmen Blacker - English japanologist Cambridge lecturer
- Thomas Blakiston - English naturalist noted for Blakiston's Line and Blakiston's Fish Owl
- Reginald Horace Blyth - helped to introduce Zen and Haiku to the West during WWII into the 1950s, one of his students being Alan Watts
- Alan Booth - author of The Roads to Sata and a Noh enthusiast
- Duncan Gordon Boyes - winner of the Victoria Cross at Shimonoseki, 1864
- Anna Brassey - an early traveller was Brassey in 1877
- William Robert Broughton - surveyed Eastern Honshu and Hokkaido in HMS Providence between 1795 and 1798
- Richard Henry Brunton - father of Japanese Lighthouses
- Ella Du Cane - British artist who visited in 1904
- Helen Caddick - travelled to Japan in 1893
- Basil Hall Chamberlain - translator and prominent japanologist
- Edward Bramwell Clarke - professor who helped introduce rugby to Japan
- Richard Cocks - head merchant of the first British venture in Hirado from 1613 to 1623
- Samuel Cocking - Yokohama merchant
- Josiah Conder - architect known for the Rokumeikan, his books on Japanese gardening and being a pupil of Kawanabe Kyosai
- Hugh Cortazzi - japanologist and former ambassador
- James Main Dixon, former FRSE - Scottish professor who taught Natsume Soseki
- William Gray Dixon - see Land of the Morning
- Archibald Douglas - foreign advisor to the Imperial Japanese Navy, introduced football to Japanese naval cadets
- Christopher Dresser - designer and major influence on the Anglo-Japanese style and writer on Japan
- Henry Dyer - first principal of the Imperial College of Engineering (Kobu Daigakko), taught Tanabe Sakuro in 1877 who designed Lake Biwa Canal which became Japan's first hydroelectric power facility
- Alfred East - English watercolour artist commissioned by the Fine Art Society to paint scenes in Japan in 1889
- Lord Elgin - signatory to the British 'unequal' treaty of 1858
- William Empson - lived in Japan during the 1930s, known for The Face of the Buddha
- James Alfred Ewing - Scottish professor
- Reginald Farrer - Field botanist who lived in Tokyo in 1903
- Henry Faulds - Scottish doctor who founded a hospital in Tsukiji which became the basis for St. Luke's International Hospital and helped introduce Joseph Lister's antiseptic methods to Japanese Surgeons
- Hugh Fraser - British minister 1889–94
- Mary Crawford Fraser - see Diplomatist's Wife in Japan
- Thomas Blake Glover - Scottish trader who was key to the industrialisation of Meiji Japan, smuggled over the Choshu Five to Britain
- Abel Gower - consul
- William Gowland - father of Japanese archaeology
- Thomas Lomar Gray - engineering professor and seismologist
- Arthur Hasketh Groom - creator of the first golf course in Japan
- John Harington Gubbins - diplomat to the Empire of Japan
- Nicholas John Hannen - British barrister for the British Supreme Court for China and Japan from 1871 to 1900 in varying roles
- Charles Holmes - owner of the Studio Magazine, visited Japan in 1889, who along with Walter Crane were heavily influenced by Japanese aesthetics
- Edward Atkinson Hornel - Scottish artist influenced by Japanese design who visited from 1893 to 1894
- Collingwood Ingram - known as "Cherry Ingram", a specialist cherry tree collector
- Grace James - Japanese folklorist and children's writer
- Elizabeth Keith - artist who visited from 1915 to 1935 intermittently, working in the Shin-hanga style
- Cargill Gilston Knott - Scottish physicist whose work in seismology led to the first earthquake hazard survey of Japan
- Frank Toovey Lake – young sailor who died aged 19 interred in Sanuki Hiroshima whose grave has been up-kept since 1868
- Bernard Leach - an influential potter whose formative years were spent in Japan
- Mary Cornwall Legh - Anglican missionary who worked with those with leprosy
- John Liggins - Anglican missionary who landed in 1859
- Arthur Lloyd - Anglican missionary notable for his work on Mahayana Buddhism
- Ernest A Hart - prominent 19th century art collector, visited Japan in 1891 with Alice Hart
- Jan Linton - British musician active in Tokyo and Juliana's club from 1990 to 2005
- Joseph Henry Longford - consul and academic
- Claude Maxwell MacDonald - diplomat
- Ranald MacDonald - the first native English teacher in Japan
- Charles Maries - English botanist sent by Veitch Nurseries who collected in Japan from 1877 to 1879
- Annette Meakin - first Englishwoman to get to Japan via the Trans-Siberian Railway, also wrote about the Ainu people in 1901
- John Milne - professor and father of seismology
- Bertram Freeman-Mitford, 1st Baron Redesdale - diplomat and author of Tales of Old Japan
- Edmund Morel – 'the father of Japanese railways', a foreign advisor to the Meiji government on railways
- Augustus Henry Mounsey - British diplomat in the 1870s
- Ivan Morris - Japanese academic, translator of the Sarashina Nikki in 1971
- James Murdoch - wrote the first academic history of Japan in English
- Iso Mutsu - author of Kamakura: Fact and Legend
- Edward St. John Neale, Lt.-Col, secretary of legation, then chargé d'affaires 1862–1863
- Mary Clarke Nind, Methodist missionary who toured Japan in May 1894
- Marianne North, Victorian traveller and botany painter who visited in 1875
- Laurence Oliphant – secretary of the legation in 1861
- Bathia Catherine Ozaki - - Saburo Ozaki's wife, who married in 1869 and are considered an early 'International' Japanese couple, akin to Alethea Sannomiya (m. 1874), the earliest example being Yuki Magome who married William Adams about 1605
- Sherard Osborn - cisited and published in 1859 some of the first woodcut illustrations from Japan in England
- Yei Theodora Ozaki - a 20th-century translator of Japanese fairy tales for children in English
- Henry Spencer Palmer - foreign advisor on civil engineering for the Yokohama area and The Times correspondent
- Harry Smith Parkes - diplomat during Boshin War
- Alfred Parsons - visited and wrote of Japan from 1892 to 1895 in "Notes in Japan"
- John Perry - colleague of Ayrton at the Imperial College of Engineering, Tokyo
- Charles Lennox Richardson - slain in the Namamugi Incident
- Hannah Riddell - opened the first leprosy research laboratory in Japan in 1918
- Frederick Ringer - industrialist and Nagasaki businessman
- George Bailey Sansom - japanologist of the early 20th century
- Ernest Mason Satow - notable diplomat and japanologist
- Timon Screech - SOAS - professor of arts
- John William Robertson Scott - writer of The Foundations of Japan which describes rural life in WWI Japan
- Alexander Allan Shand - British banker who proposed the idea of the central bank in the 1870s
- Alexander Croft Shaw - Anglican missionary
- Alexander Cameron Sim - founder of Kobe Regatta & Athletic Club, introduced lemonade (Ramune) to Japan.
- Admiral Sir James Stirling – signatory to the 1854 treaty
- F.W. Strange - introduced collegiate rowing to Meiji Japan in 1877 at Yokohama YARC
- Frederick William Sutton - early English photographer
- Arthur Waley - first native English translator of The Tale of Genji
- Walter Weston - Rev. who publicised the term "Japanese Alps"
- William Willis - doctor
- Channing Moore Williams - founder of Rikkyo University, he also helped to set up the Anglican Church in Japan
- Ernest Henry Wilson - plant collector who brought 63 sakura to the West from 1911 to 1916, the Wilson stump (ウィルソン株, Wilson kabu) also has his namesake
- Charles Wirgman - editor of Japan Punch
- Annie Yeamans - circus performer who toured Yokohama in 1866
- Chris Broad - filmmaker, author, and notable YouTuber

The chronological list of Heads of the United Kingdom Mission in Japan.

== Japanese in the United Kingdom ==
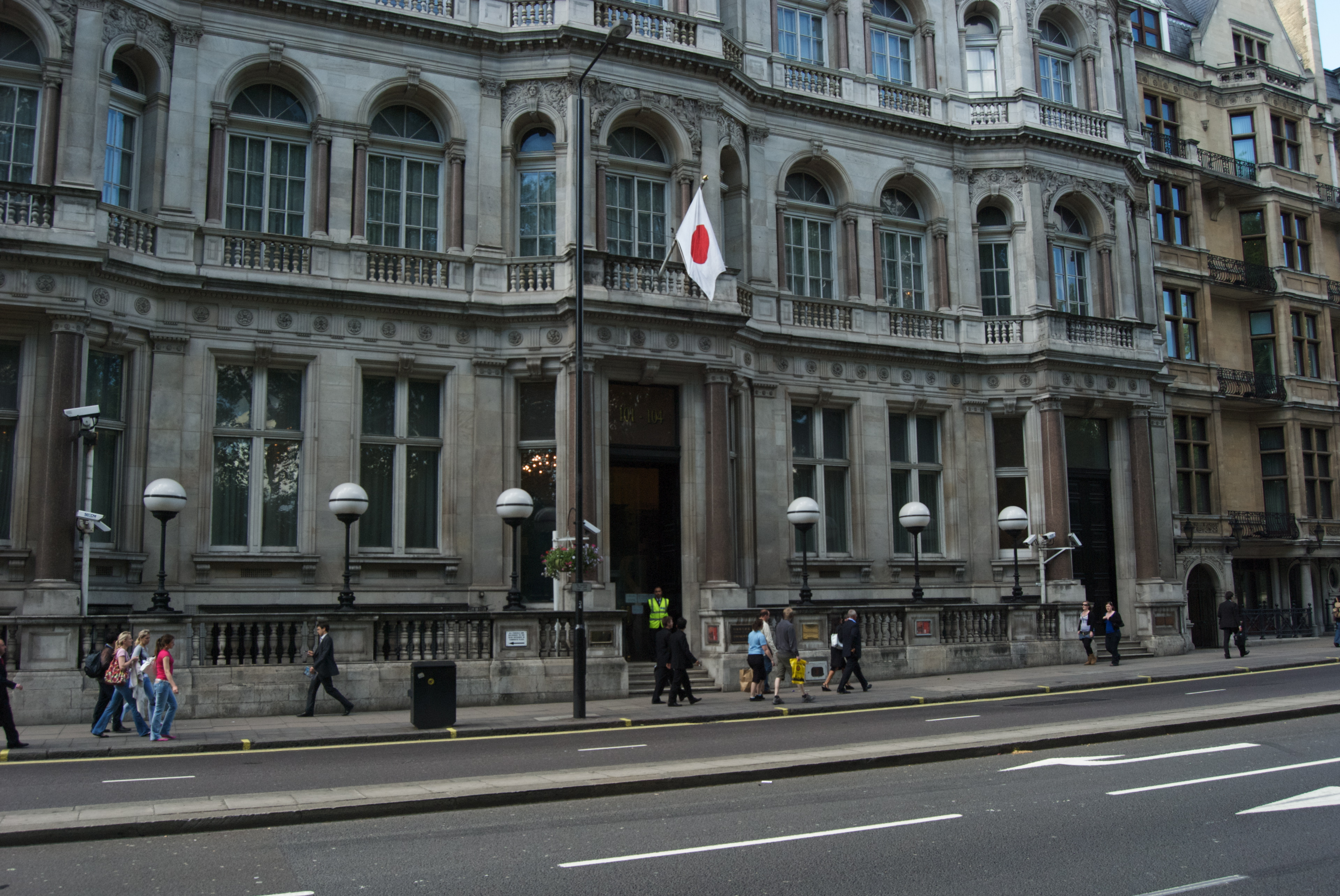
Embassy of Japan in London

The family name is given in italics. Usually the family name comes first in regards to Japanese historical figures, but in modern times not so for the likes of Kazuo Ishiguro and Katsuhiko Oku, both well known in the United Kingdom.

- Aoki Shuzo - Diplomat, signed the 1894 treaty in London
- HRH Arisugawa Takehito - Served with the Royal Navy and frequently visited England between 1879 and 1905
- Ruth Okabe Buhicrosan (1851 - 1914) - Japanese-British published author in 1885, wife of Tannaker Buhicrosan
- Uriemon Eaton - First person of Japanese descent to attend British College in 1639
- Misao Gamo - Japanese socialite and diplomats wife in Edwardian Britain
- Tsuneko Gauntlett - Prominent Social Rights Activist, member of the Woman's Christian Temperance Union
- Genda Minoru - Naval attaché and planner of the Pearl Harbor strike; in 1940 he saw Spitfires and Bf 109s in combat over London during the Battle of Britain
- Hayashi Gonsuke - Minister who promoted Japanese arts in 1894 in London
- Hayashi Tadasu - A student in London from 1866 - 1868
- Yuzuru Hiraga - IJN naval officer who was educated at London from 1905 - 1908, part of the design team for the famous Yamato battleship
- Taka Hirose - Bassist of the band Feeder
- Hoshi Tōru - First Japanese lawyer in 1877
- Inagaki Manjirō - Cambridge University graduate and diplomat
- Imekanu - Ainu Yukar poet who worked with John Batchelor
- Kazuo Ishiguro - Famous Writer, see The Remains of the Day
- Iwakura Tomomi - see Iwakura mission especially
- Shinji Kagawa - played for English football club Manchester United

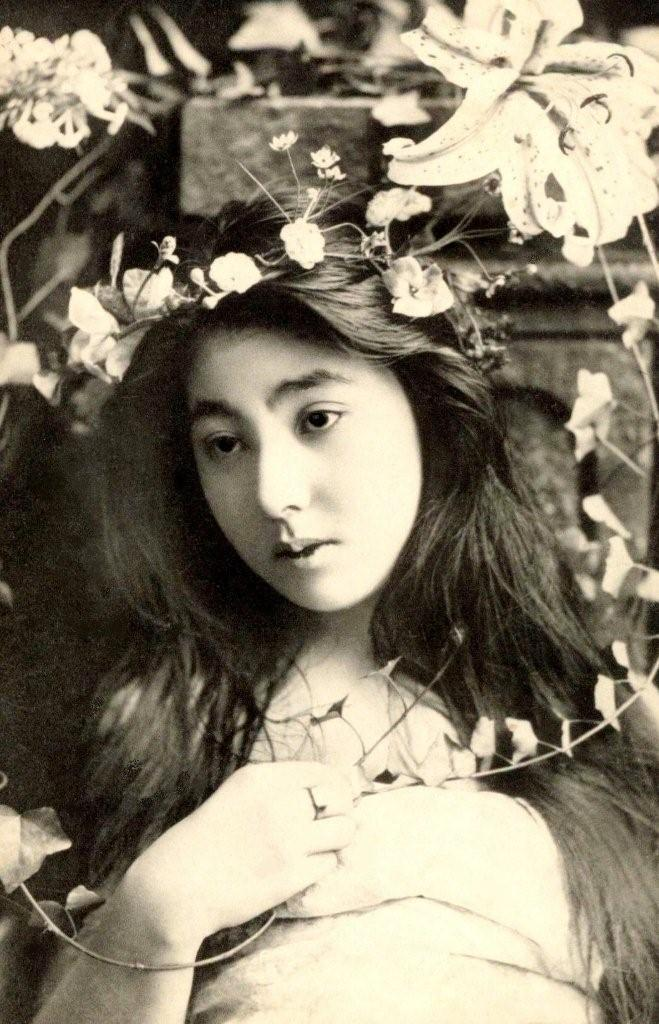
Sadayakko as Ophelia in Hamuretto (1903)

- Kamisaka Sekka - Studied and spread Japonisme and Art Nouveau, studied in Glasgow from 1901 - 1910
- Kikuchi Dairoku - Cambridge University graduate and politician
- Tatsuno Kingo - Studied under Conder and William Burges between 1877 and 1883 in Japan and England
- Gunji Koizumi - Brought Judo to UK, students include Sarah Mayer, first non-Japanese woman to earn a Black belt
- Kunisawa Shinkurō - Yōga painter who studied in England in the Meiji era
- Yoshio Markino - Japanese Artist active in London in the first half of the 20th century
- Mori Arinori - Studied at University College London in 1865 one of the Satsuma students
- Naoko Mori - Actress - famous for playing Toshiko Sato in Torchwood and Doctor Who
- Yoshinori Muto - Footballer for Newcastle United
- Shunsuke Nakamura - played for Scottish football club Celtic
- Natsume Sōseki - Author of I Am a Cat
- Utako Shimoda - Visited Britain in 1894 to study Women's Education where she was received by Queen Victoria
- Teruko Sono - First female lawyer in Japan, visited in 1893 raising £155,000 to build Komatsu-juku (a girls School) opened in 1894 in Azabu
- Tsuda Umeko - Leader of Women's Rights in Education who used St Hilda's College, Oxford and other British HE schools to help model a female-driven Women's University in 1902
- Tetsu Yasui - Studied in Britain between 1897 and 1900, then in Wales between 1907 and 1909
- Shinji Okazaki - footballer for Leicester City
- Katsuhiko Oku - Oxford University rugby player, diplomat in Japanese embassy in London who died in Iraq, 2003. Posthumously promoted to ambassador. See also the Oku-Inoue fund for the children of Iraq.
- Kishichiro Okura - 20th century Entrepreneur
- Hisashi Owada - Cambridge University graduate, father of Princess Masako
- Hiromi Marissa Ozaki - Royal College of Art Major, Artist and Designer (active 2007–present)
- Rina Sawayama - 21st century Musician
- Suematsu Kenchō - Cambridge University graduate and statesman
- Ginnosuke Tanaka - Cambridge University graduate, introduced rugby to Japan
- Tōgō Heihachirō - Spent time in the UK, one of Japan's greatest naval heroes, the "Nelson of the East"
- Gnyuki ''Torimaru'' - Fashion designer (b.1937) going under his Yuki label in the 1970s-1980s, known for his jersey-drape dresses as worn by Diana to Japan in 1986
- Dame Mitsuko Uchida - Classical Pianist
- Uenishi Sadakazu - Bartitsu practitioner, Edith Margaret Garrud & Emily Diana Watts also practiced Suffrajitsu under his tutelage
- Kawakami Sadayakko or Sada Yacco - Performed in London as Ophelia and was promoted by Ellen Terry
- Will Sharpe - BAFTA Winning Actor and Director known for Giri/Haji (2019)
- Maya Yoshida - footballer currently playing for Premier League club Southampton
- Yamao Yōzō - Member of the Choshu Five, see also Japanese students in the United Kingdom
- Prince Higashifushimi Yorihito - First member of the Japanese Royal Family to study abroad in 1871
- Diana Yukawa - Solo Violinist and Composer

== Education ==
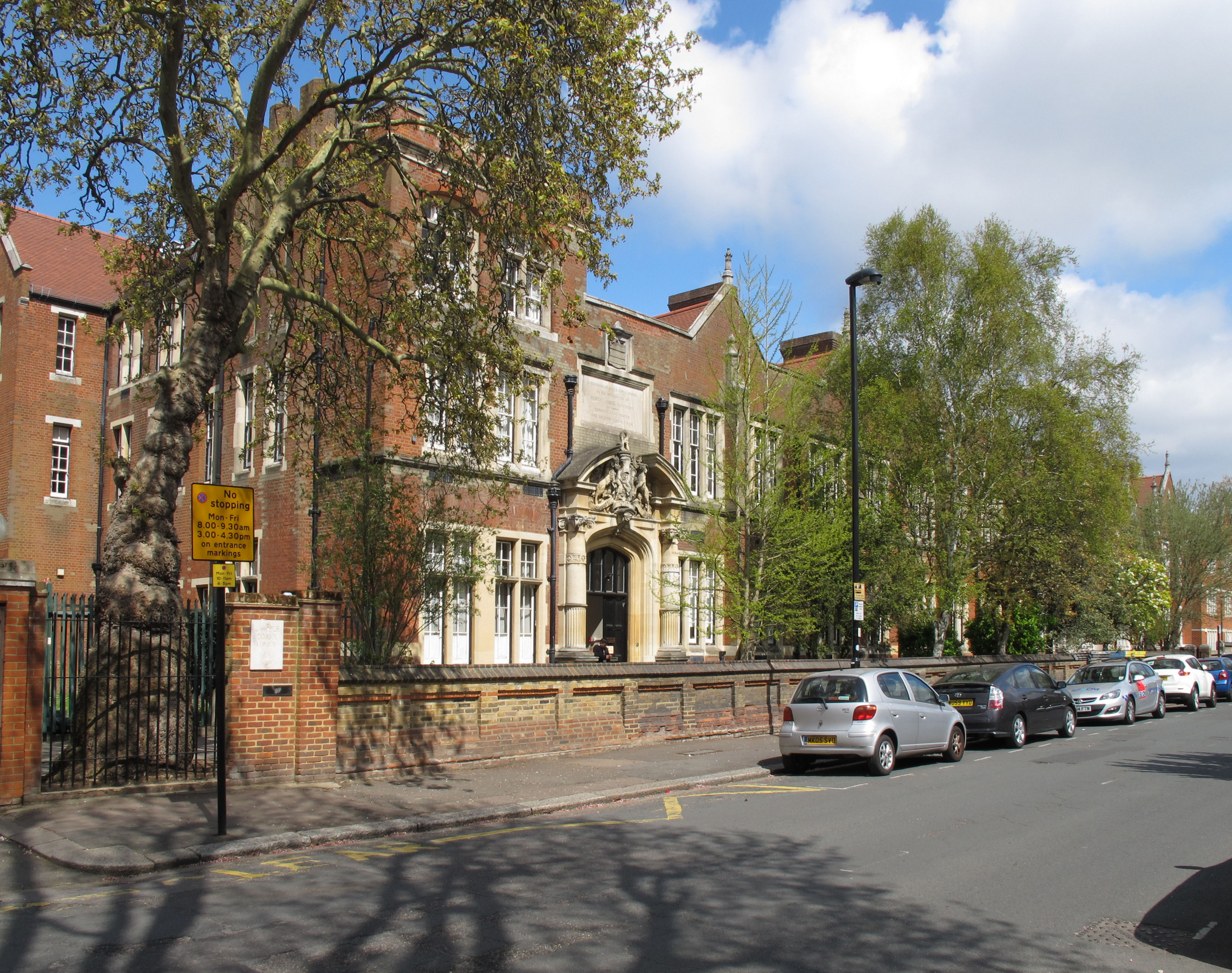
Japanese School in London

In Japan

- British School in Tokyo
- Rugby School Japan

In the UK

- Japanese School in London
- Rikkyo School in England
- Teikyo School United Kingdom
- Chaucer College
- Teikyo University of Japan in Durham

Former institutions in the UK

- Gyosei International School UK (closed)
- Shi-Tennoji School in UK (closed)
- Gyosei International College in the U.K. (merged into the University of Reading)

== Cultural relations ==
=== Sports ===
British sports had an impact on Japan during the Meiji modernisation. Cricket was present in Japan's foreign settlements, played by both British and American expatriates, until baseball grew in popularity by the early 20th century.

== List of Japanese diplomatic envoys in the United Kingdom (partial list) ==
=== Ministers plenipotentiary ===
- Terashima Munenori 1872–1873
- Kagenori Ueno 1874–1879
- Mori Arinori 1880–1884
- Masataka Kawase 1884–1893
- Aoki Shūzō 1894
- Katō Takaaki 1895–1900
- Hayashi Tadasu 1900–1905

=== Ambassadors ===
- Hayashi Tadasu 1905–1906
- Komura Jutarō 1906–1908
- Katō Takaaki 2nd time, 1908–1912
- Katsunosuke Inoue 1913–1916
- Chinda Sutemi 1916–1920
- Gonsuke Hayashi 1920–1925
- Keishiro Matsui 1925–1928
- Matsudaira Tsuneo 1929–1935
- Shigeru Yoshida 1936–1938
- Mamoru Shigemitsu 1938–1941
- Shunichi Matsumoto 1952–1955
- Haruhiko Nishi 1955–1957
- Katsumi Ōno 1958–1964
- Morio Yukawa 1968–1972
- Haruki Mori 1972–?
- Masaki Orita 2001–2004
- Yoshiji Nogami 2004–2008
- Shin Ebihara 2008–2011
- Keiichi Hayashi 2011–2016
- Koji Tsuruoka 2016–2019
- Yasumasa Nagamine 2019–2021
- Hajime Hayashi 2021–2024
- Hiroshi Suzuki 2024–present

== See also ==
- List of ambassadors of the United Kingdom to Japan
- Accession of the United Kingdom to CPTPP
- History of Japanese foreign relations
  - Ian Nish, historian
- Japanese entry into World War I
- British Japan Consular Service
- o-yatoi gaikokujin – foreign employees in Meiji era Japan
- Foreign cemeteries in Japan
- Japan Society of the UK
- Japanese in the United Kingdom, British people of Japanese descent
- Iwakura Mission, visits Europe 1871–1873
- gaikoku bugyō, commissioners of foreign affairs
- Chōshū Five, visits UK 1863
- Japanese students in the United Kingdom
- List of Westerners who visited Japan before 1868
