= Kagenori Ueno =

Japanese diplomat (1845–1888)

- 上野 景範
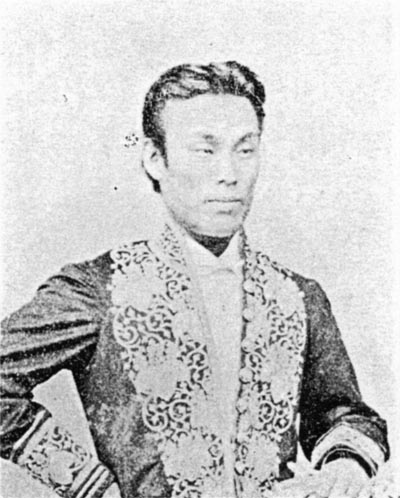
- Born: January 8, 1845
- Died: April 11, 1888 (aged 43)

Kagenori Ueno (上野 景範, Ueno Kagenori, January 8, 1845 – April 11, 1888) was Japanese Consul in Great Britain from 1874 to 1879. He spoke English and Dutch, which he learned in Kagoshima.

In 1875 was involved in negotiations with the Ottoman Ambassador to London about the possibility of establishing diplomatic relations between the Turkish and the Japanese governments.
