= Kunisawa Shinkurō =

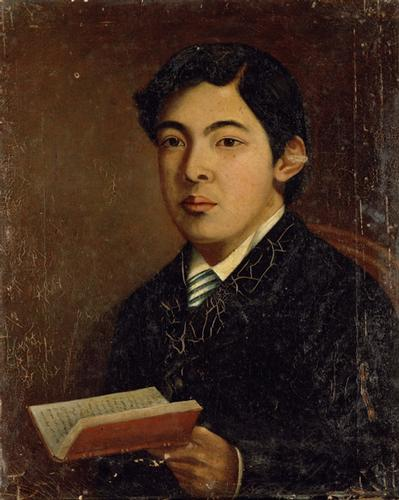
- Self-portrait
- Born: January 27, 1848
- Died: March 12, 1877 (aged 29)
- Known for: Painting
- Movement: Yōga

Kunisawa Shinkurō (国沢新九郎) (1848‍–‍1877) was a pioneer of Western-style painting in early Meiji era Japan. Born to a retainer of the Tosa Domain, he studied in England under the portrait painter John Edgar Williams, before returning to Japan and opening the Shōgidō (彰技堂) Yōga art school in 1874. His students include Honda Kinkichirō (本多錦吉郎), Morizumi Isana (守住勇魚), Araki Kanpo (荒木寛畝)(1831~1915), Ikeda Shōen (池田蕉園) and Asai Chū.

== See also ==
- Takahashi Yuichi
