= Reciprocal access agreement =

Bilateral defense and security pact involving Japan

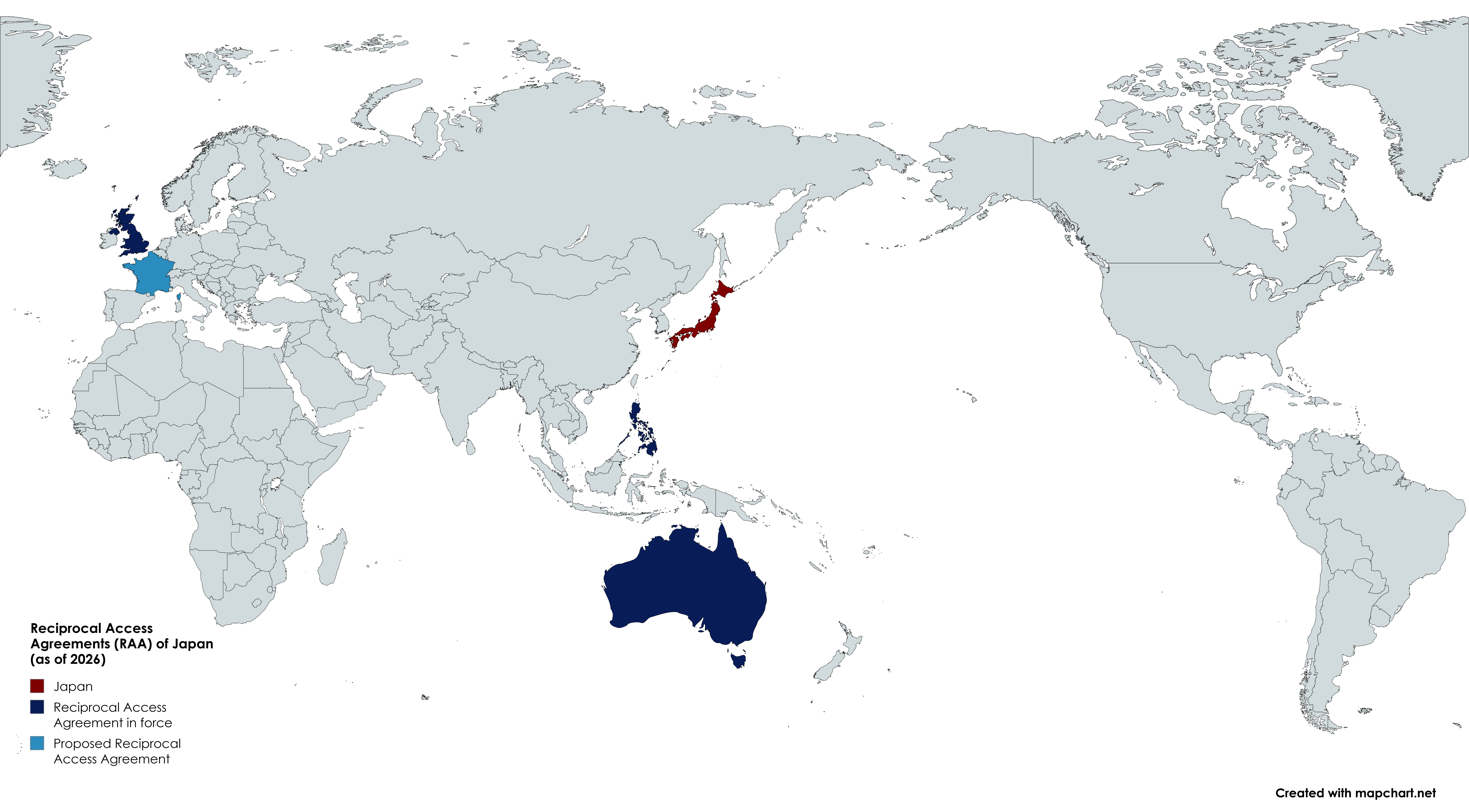
Reciprocal access agreements of Japan

A reciprocal access agreement (RAA) (Japanese: 部隊間協力円滑化協定, lit. 'force-to-force cooperation facilitation agreement') refers to a bilateral defense and security pacts between governments that provides shared military training and military operations. It is an agreement built to create a framework for the two cooperating countries to move their military force whenever required, and also provides a pathway for goods to be imported and exported from one country to the other through following the movement of visiting military forces.

RAAs have been established between Japan and Australia, Japan and the United Kingdom and Japan and the Philippines. For Australia, the signing of a reciprocal access agreement has later been used to further strengthen ties with other countries like India and the United States, and to also renew old pacts like the Joint Declaration on Security Cooperation (JDSC).

== Active ==
The following RAAs have been signed and are currently active.

=== Japan and Australia ===
Discussions over signing of the Japan-Australia Reciprocal Access Agreement (Japanese: 日豪円滑化協定), officially Agreement between Japan and Australia concerning the facilitation of reciprocal access and cooperation between the Self-Defense Forces of Japan and the Australian Defence Force began in 2014 and was to be the second significant security pact Japan has made with another country ever since the 1960 Status of Forces Agreement with the United States. It was signed during a virtual summit on 6 January 2022 by Japanese Prime Minister Fumio Kishida and Australian Prime Minister Scott Morrison after the former declined all overseas travel due to the increasing COVID-19 cases at the time.

The pact has since then risen in prominence against the recent geopolitical tension and increasing competition in the Indo-Pacific space. Japan and Australia have shared concerns over China's growing maritime activities in the South China Sea, along with the concerns over a potential conflict with the Chinese Communist Party. This was later exacerbated by China's imposement of economic and diplomatic sanctions in response to Australia's call for promoting and inquiry into the origins of the COVID-19 virus.

On 22 October 2022, Prime Ministers Anthony Albanese of Australia and Kishida Fumio further used the RAA to revise an old pact known as the Joint Declaration on Security Cooperation (JDSC). The initial JDSC was signed back in 2007 and signed by Prime Ministers John Howard and Abe Shinzo, in part as a response to the growing security ties in the wake of the September 11 attacks. It was initially a non-binding security agreement, but the revision has made it a binding treaty between the two countries, and has allowed a more efficient utilization of the RAA.

The Japan Australia RAA has also been used as a stepping stone to strengthen the ties between India and the United States, which formed an official grouping with Japan and Australia known as the Quadrilateral Security Dialogue, or simply "The Quad". This group was initially formed in 2004 after the 2004 Indian Ocean earthquake and tsunami. There was initially some discussion over forming joint military exercises between the four nations back in 2007, but that was later scrapped due to heavy criticism from China. This was later rectified in 2020, with the four nations holding their first joint military exercise. This was done in part due to the growing concerns over Beijing's actions in backing Moscow and their distancing from the West.

=== Japan and the United Kingdom ===
On 5 May 2022, during an in-person meeting in Downing Street, United Kingdom Prime Minister Boris Johnson and Kishida agreed to begin discussions over signing an agreement similar to the RAA between Australia and Japan. Similar to the original Japan Australia RAA, this was done to both ease the hosting of joint military exercises and to simplify the process of bringing troops from one country to another. In addition, this new agreement has allowed Japan to jointly develop a next-generation fighter jet. This would be the first time Japan has worked on a major military project with another country other than the United States.

On the 11 January 2023, Japanese Prime Minister Fumio Kishida and UK Prime Minister Rishi Sunak signed the Japan-UK Reciprocal Access Agreement (Japanese: 日英部隊間協力円滑化協定), officially Agreement between Japan and the United Kingdom of Great Britain and Northern Ireland concerning the facilitation of reciprocal access and cooperation between the Self-Defense Forces of Japan and the Armed Forces of the United Kingdom of Great Britain and Northern Ireland during Kishida's visit to London that will allow both nations to deploy troops in each other's countries. The UK will be the first European country to have such a reciprocal access agreement with Japan, with the UK government describing the pact as the most important of its type since the 1902 Anglo-Japanese Alliance.

=== Japan and the Philippines ===
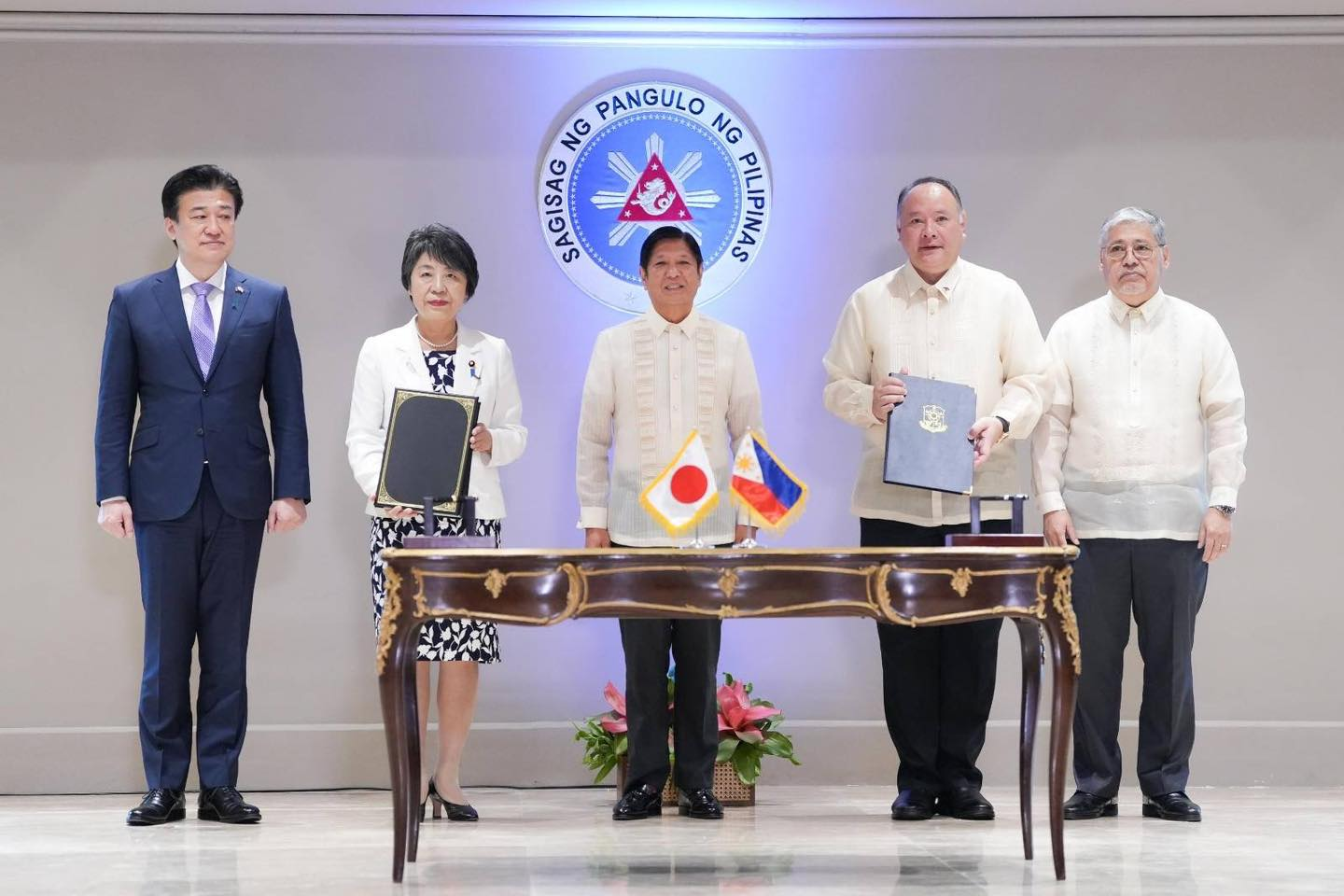
Signing ceremony for the Philippine RAA on 8 July 2024

On 3 November 2023, Japan and the Philippines announced that they had begun talks for a Reciprocal Access Agreement. On 6 November 2023, Philippine Defense Secretary Gilberto Teodoro stated that his country wanted to reach an agreement "at the soonest possible time".

On 8 July 2024, Philippine Defense Secretary Gilberto Teodoro and Japanese Foreign Minister Yoko Kamikawa signed the Philippines-Japan Reciprocal Access Agreement (Japanese: 日フィリピン部隊間協力円滑化協定), officially the Agreement between Japan and the Republic of the Philippines Concerning the Facilitation of Reciprocal Access and Cooperation between the Self-Defense Forces of Japan and the Armed Forces of the Philippines, the first RAA negotiated with a Southeast Asian nation. It would take effect after ratification by the countries' legislatures, Philippine and Japanese officials said.

On 16 December 2024, the RAA was signed officially and unanimously ratified by the Philippine Senate (Resolution No. 1248). The RAA was approved by the Japan Diet on June 6, 2025. It came into force on September 11, 2025.

== Proposed ==
The following agreements are currently being negotiated.

=== France and Japan ===
On 20 January 2022, Japan and France held a meeting to bolster military cooperation in response to China's actions in the South China Sea and North Korea's advancing nuclear and missiles development.

=== South Korea and the United Kingdom ===
On 20 November 2023, South Korea and the UK signed the Downing Street accord which exponentially increases military cooperation between the two countries. It has been proposed that the two countries should forge an institutionalized agreement, modeled after the Japan-UK Reciprocal Access Agreement, to build upon the Downing Street accord further.

== See also ==
- AUKUS
- List of military alliances
- Status of forces agreement
- Visiting forces agreement
