= Uriemon Eaton =

First Japanese Briton to attend Trinity College, Cambridge

- Born: Hirado, Japan
- Died: Kingdom of England
- Occupation: Scholar
- Known for: Being the first Japanese Briton to attend Trinity College, Cambridge

Uriemon Eaton or Ureamon Eaton (fl. 1639–1640, c.1621–1670) was a Trinity College alumnus and early member of the Japanese in the United Kingdom.

== Biography ==
Eaton was an early member of the Japanese in the United Kingdom, born in Hirado, Japan after his father William Eaton and mother Kamezo (William's common-law wife) met during the period of the opening of the English trade factory East India Company in Japan (1613-1623). Eaton also had a half sister 'Helena' born to O'Man. In English sources such as the Diary of Richard Cocks, early Euro-Asian relations are discussed including his life as a member of the English community in Japan. On occasion he appears in the English records as both William or Uriemon Eaton.

Cocks relays how Eaton was taken by his father to live with him in England at a young age after the closing of the English factory in 1623, travelling separately via Batavia on a Dutch ship in 1624, sent by Cocks. His family left behind in Japan (Kamezou and Helena) also kept in contact from Japan until at least 1624 via Cocks. When Cocks died in 1624, Uriemon was accepted and 'maintained' (supported) through his studies by family and friends in England. He is known to have petitioned Charles I of England in 1639 for denizen rights to gain access higher education, gaining these and attending Trinity College in Cambridge in 1640, then again after a bout of illness, in 1641. Later records point to his having survived until the late 1670s.
