= The History of Trauayle =

Travel writings by Richard Jugge

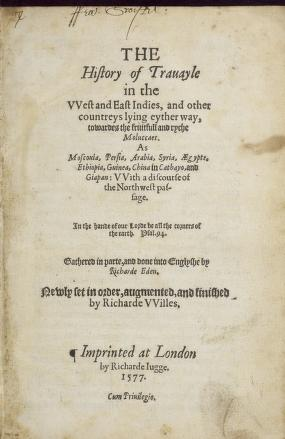
- 1577 edition
- Language: Early Modern English
- Genre: Travel Writing
- Publisher: Richard Jugge
- Publication date: 1577
- Publication place: England
- Pages: 467
- Preceded by: Richard Edens Decades of the Newe Worlde

The History of Travel (printed between 1555 and 1599) is a collection of travel writings published and printed by Richard Jugge (1514–1577). Its full title is The history of trauayle in the West and East Indies, and other countreys lying eyther way, towardes the fruitfull and ryche Moluccaes : As Moscouia, Persia, Arabia, Syria, Ægypte, Ethiopia, Guinea, China in Cathayo, and Giapan : vvith a discourse of the Northwest passage. The work records exploration narratives by sailors and explorers during the Age of Exploration.

== Contents ==
The work contains European exploration fiction (mostly Spanish and Italian accounts) which details narratives of seafarers and merchants who travelled between the 14th and 16th centuries, including Sebastian Münster, translated into English, editions of Oviedos' De la natural hystoria de las Indias (Of the natural history of the Indies), Antonio Pigafetta's Primo viaggio intorno al globo terraqueo (First trip around the terraqueous globe), Peter of Anglerias' Decades 1-3 of De orbe novo decades (Decades of the New World), and Giacomo Gastaldi's Debate and stryfe betweene the Spanyards and Portugales appear detailing some of the dominant traffick routes of the European powers. The territories visited included the West and East Indies, Moscovia, the Middle East, Egypt, Ethiopia, Guinea, China and Japan.

The text was still in circulation by the early 17th century and was printed in London by Richard Jugge in 1577. The text was a follow up edition of Richard Eden's travel work Decades of the Newe Worlde. The text was later put into Elizabethan compendiums by Richard Hakluyt in his Principall Navigations, Voiages, Traffiques and Discoueries of the English Nation (1589 and 1599). Some editions contain woodcut diagrams and historiated initial and floriated detailing.

== Giapan ==
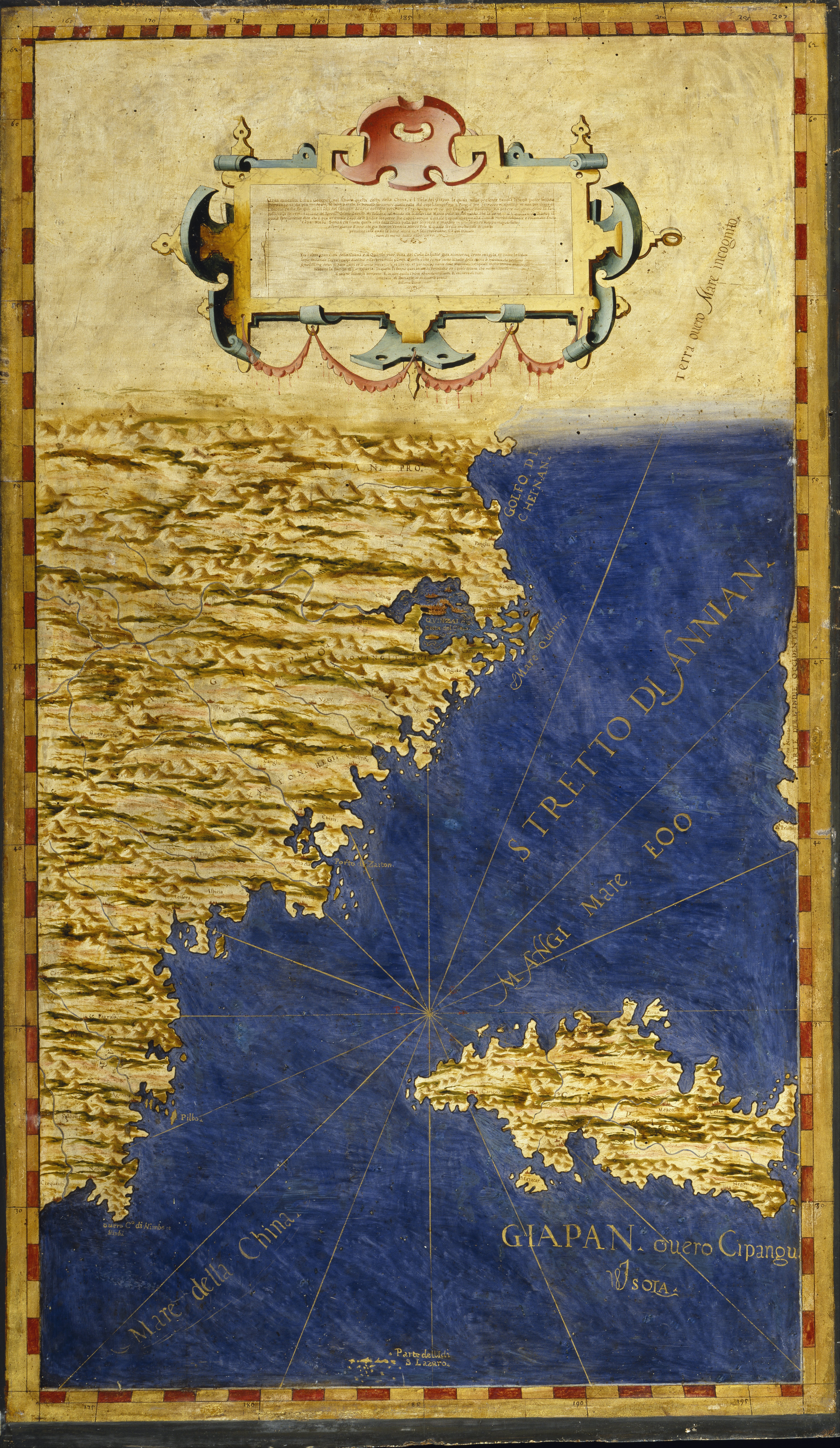
1565 - 1575 Egnazio Danti Giapan map

Richard Wylles (an English Catholic writer, b.1546 - 1577) another editor was active between 1558-1577 and co-edited the 1577 edition with Eden, penning a section entitled Of the Ilande Giapan, and other litle Iſles in the Eaſt Ocean through pages 251 - 260, thought to be one of the earliest accounts on Japan in English. The account describes how Willes ascertained 'two hitherto unknown documents that contained descriptions of both China and Japan [with a] ... report on China [that] had come into his hands by way of a Portuguese merchant who had been captured and imprisoned by ... the Ming imperial court.' Wylles had 'acquired a handful of private letters about "the Japonish nation", written by the Jesuit monk, Padre Luis Frois. These letters had been written to fellow Jesuits and were not intended to be studied – still less published – by 'hereticke' Protestants.' The Jesuits had begun missionary work in 1550 under Francis Xavier in Japan and thus the name had become Latinized to 'Giapan' or more commonly as 'Iapon'.

The documents caused interest into trade with Japan, as there were large reported silver deposits mentioned by travellers like Marco Polo and with 'so much snow that the houses being buried in it, the inhabitants keep within doores' there was thought to be an excellent wool market in Japan. The text also notes the dangers of doing business, of the great piracie attacking Ming merchants.

The text also describes the Japanese themselves being '‘tractable, civill, wittie, courteous [and] without deceit', their diet and noting the practice of honourable suicide carried out by a samurai 'lancing his body acrosse, from the breast downe all the belly, murthereth himselfe’. The Ainu of Hokkaido were noted by the monks as ‘savage men, clothed in beasts skinnes, rough-bodied, with huge beards and monstrous muchaches'.

This account would later inspire a failed voyage to Japan via the Kara Sea chartered by Hakulyt by English merchants in 1580 in the George and William, with only the George returning by 25 December and the William destroyed by ice flows traveling along the Northwest Passage.

Contemporary European Maps of Japan from 1535 - 1599

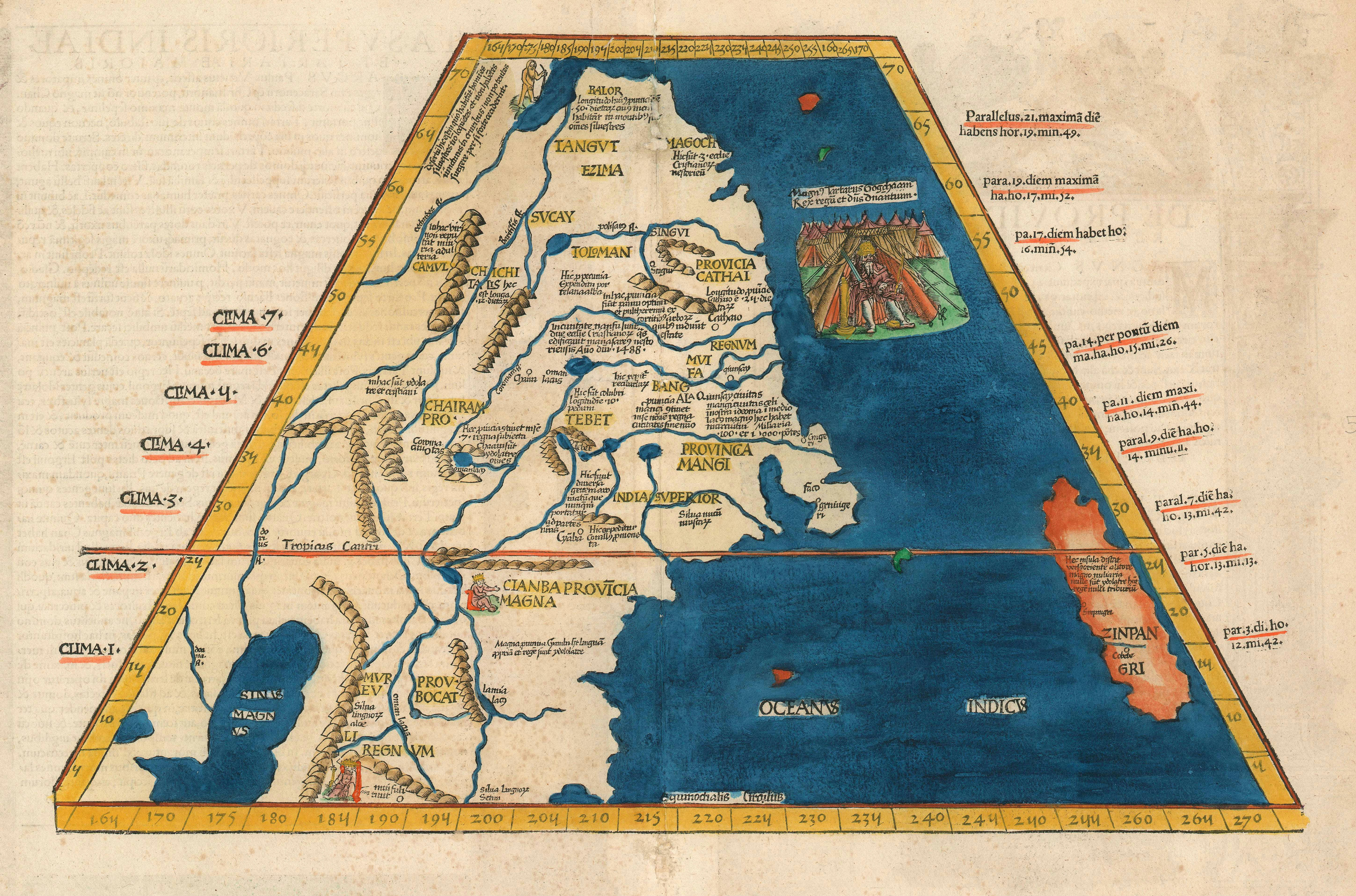
1535 map of Japan and China by German Cartographer Lorenz Fries

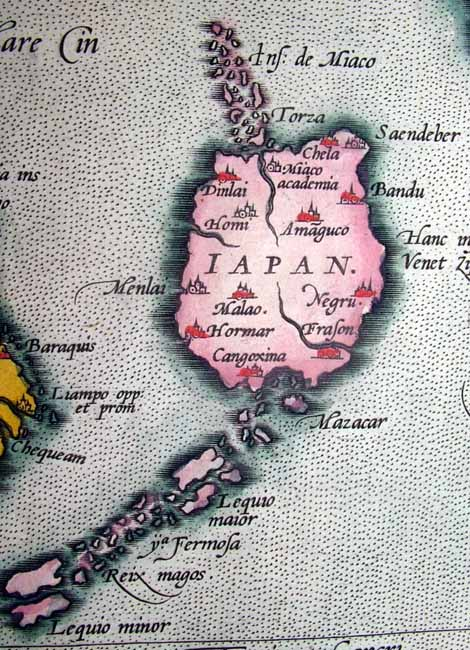
1570 Mercator Engraving of 'Iapan'.

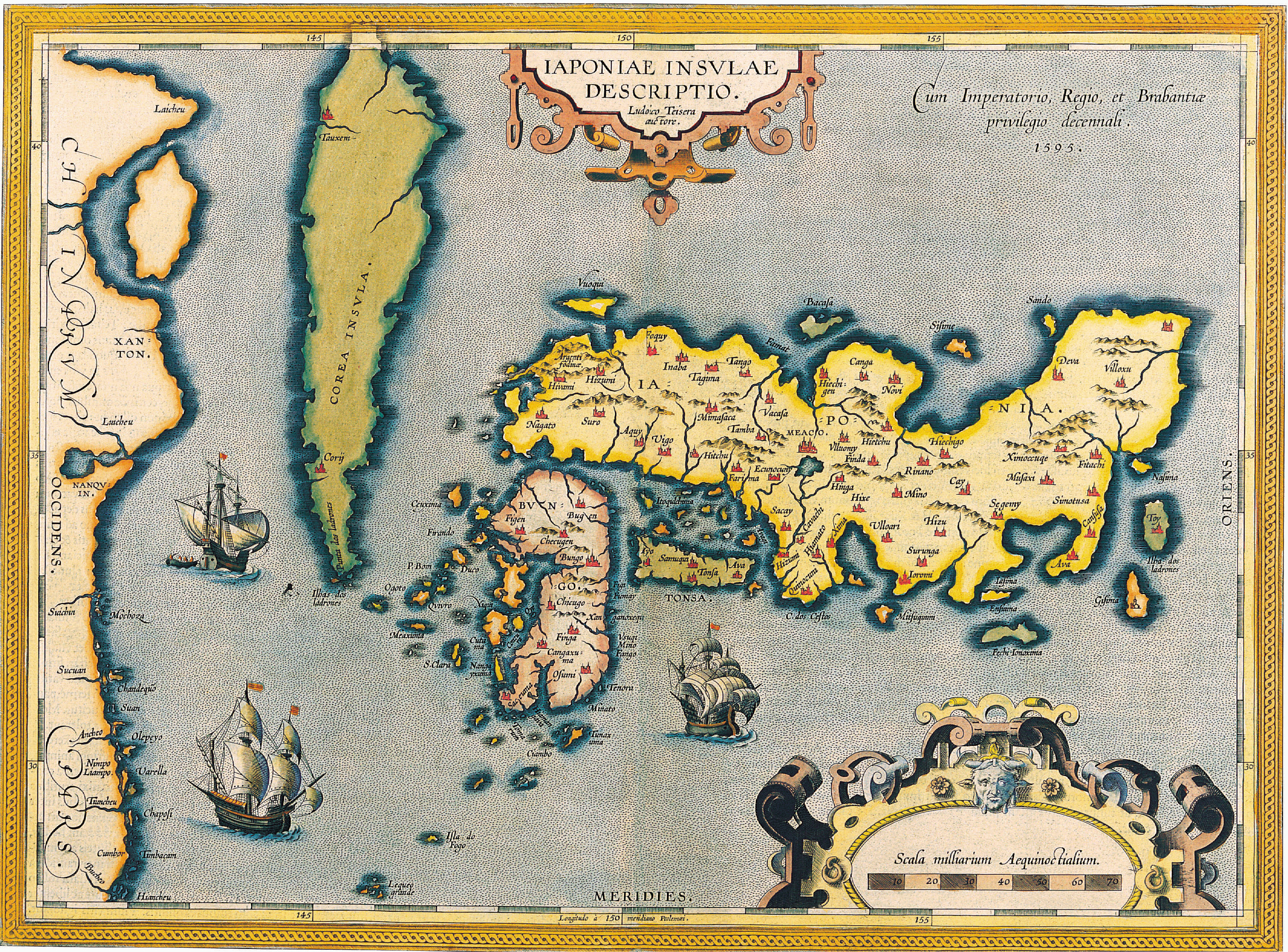
1570 map by Ortelius

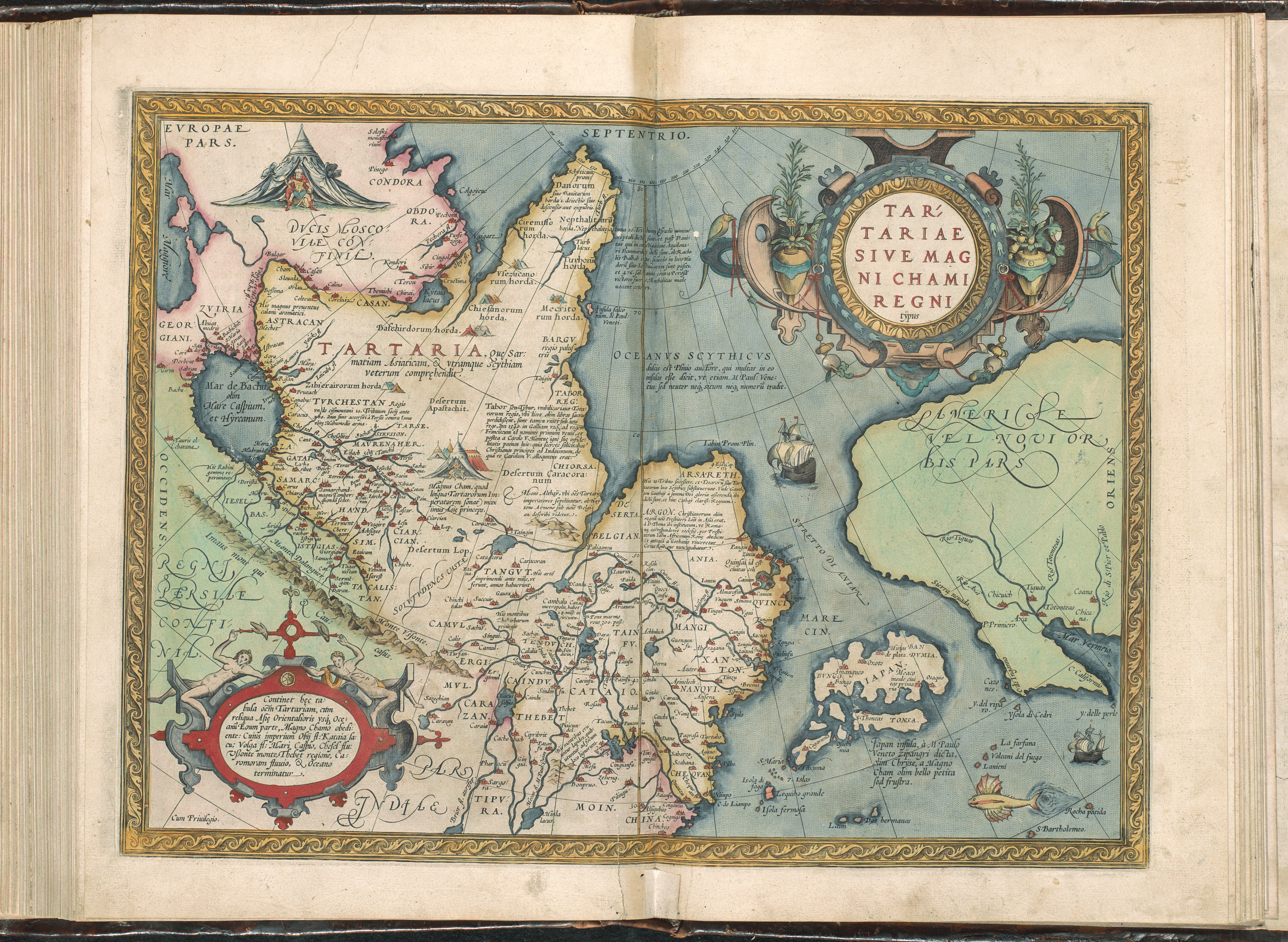
1584 map of Japan by Ortelius

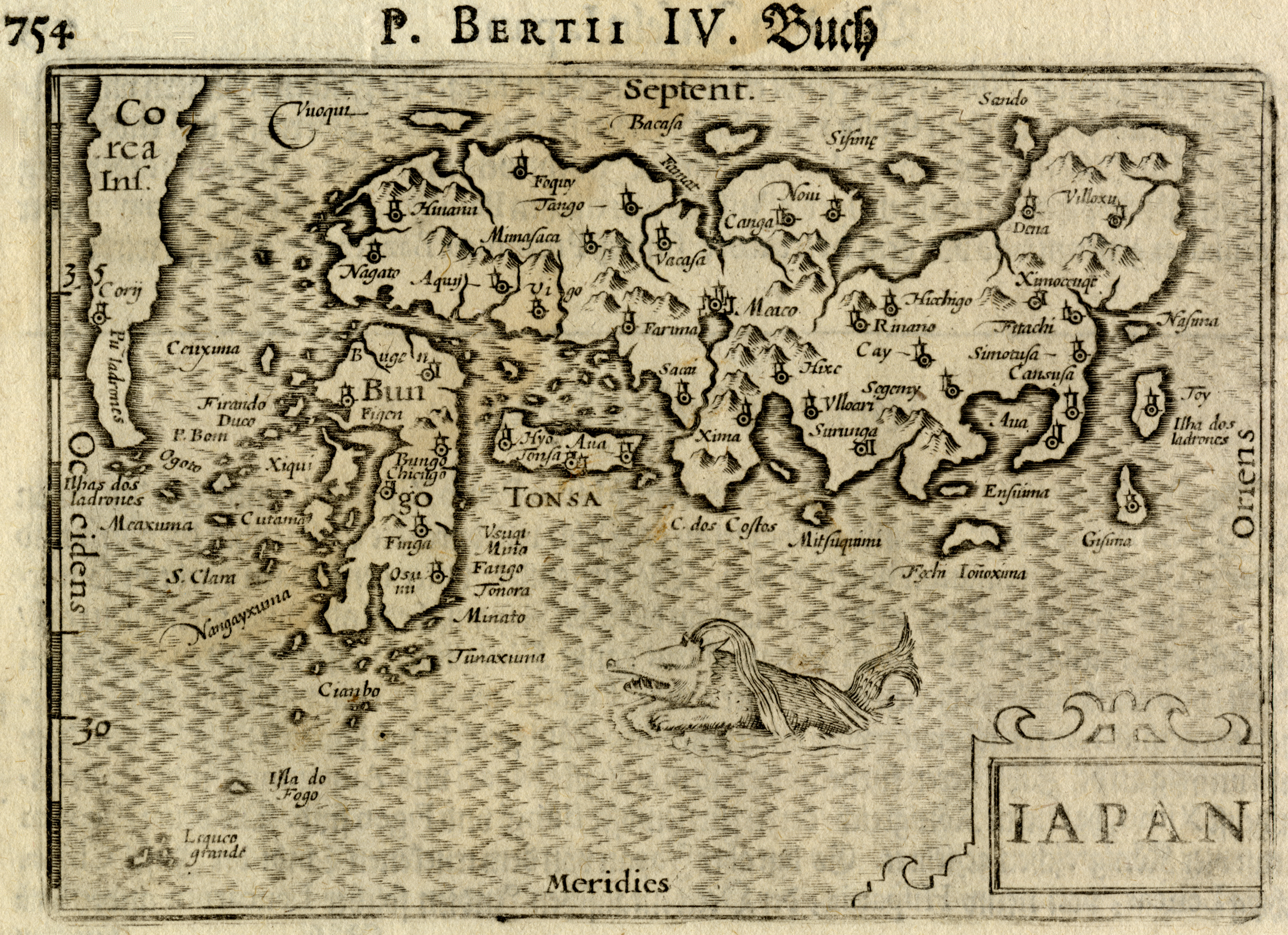
1598 map Iapan-Langenen by Barent Langenes

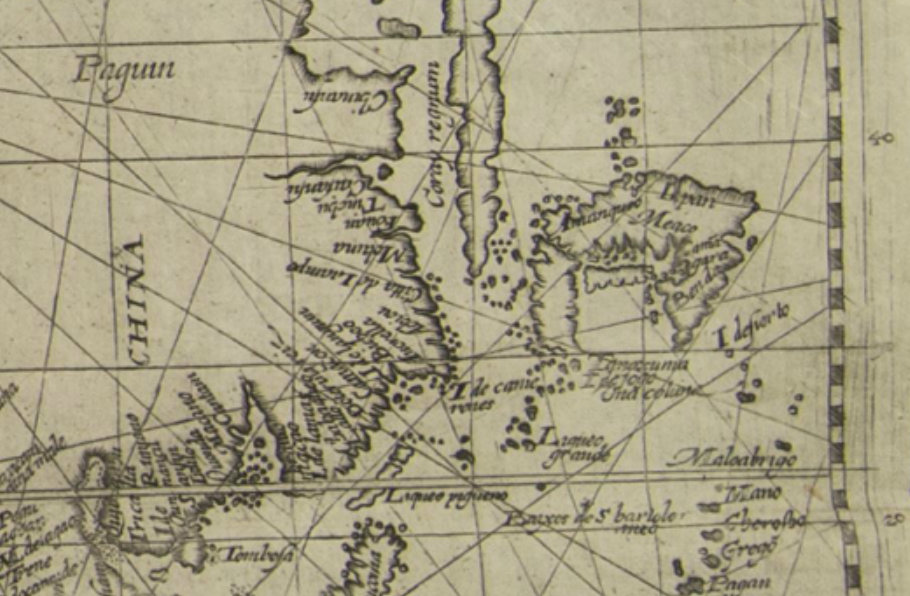
1599 estimation of Japan from the Wright-Molyneux map by Wright
