= British Japanese =

British Japanese or British-Japanese may be:

- Britons in Japan
- Japanese community in the United Kingdom
- As an adjective, anything concerning Japan–United Kingdom relations
