= Vigilant Isles 22 =

British and Japanese military exercise in Japan

The Vigilant Isles 22 is a British-Japanese joint military exercise located within the Gunma Prefecture in Japan, at an unspecified base of the Japanese armed forces. The purpose of the exercise is to train members of both the British Armed forces and those of the Japan Self-Defense Forces.

== Background ==
The exercise began in November 2022, at the base there are several units including the 1 Regiment Royal Artillery, 29 Commando Regiment, and the 104 Regiment Royal Artillery. The background to Vigilant Isles 24 is a partnership that began in October 2018, when the Japanese Ground Self Defense Force started training with the Honourable Artillery Company, as well as the May 2022 visit of Japanese Prime Minister, Fumio Kishida to the United Kingdom. According to the Embassy of Japan, London, the first joint operations began on the 22nd of November, 2023. The objective they said was to advance the ability of the Japan Self-Defense Force, and was inaugurated on the 120th anniversary of the Anglo-Japanese Alliance.

=== Speculated relation to China and Taiwan ===
In an article published by the Financial Times, which speculated on the purpose of this military exercise, although it acknowledged that there was no explicit reason offered, it is speculated that this is due to the ongoing state of China-Taiwan relations, especially the possibility that war could erupt between the two countries.

On 11 January 2023, it was announced in London that the British Ministry of Defence and the Japanese Ministry of Defense had signed a treaty which would enable the ability of both nations to deploy troops in the other. Vigilant Isles 22 alongside an earlier 2018 exercise are both understood to have been part of the warm-up to this agreement, which is widely understood to serve a role in combating China´s domination of the South China Seas because similar agreements have also been made by the Australian Defense Forces with the Japanese.
