= Hiroshi Suzuki (diplomat) =

Japanese diplomat (born 1961)

His Excellency Hiroshi Suzuki
- 鈴木浩
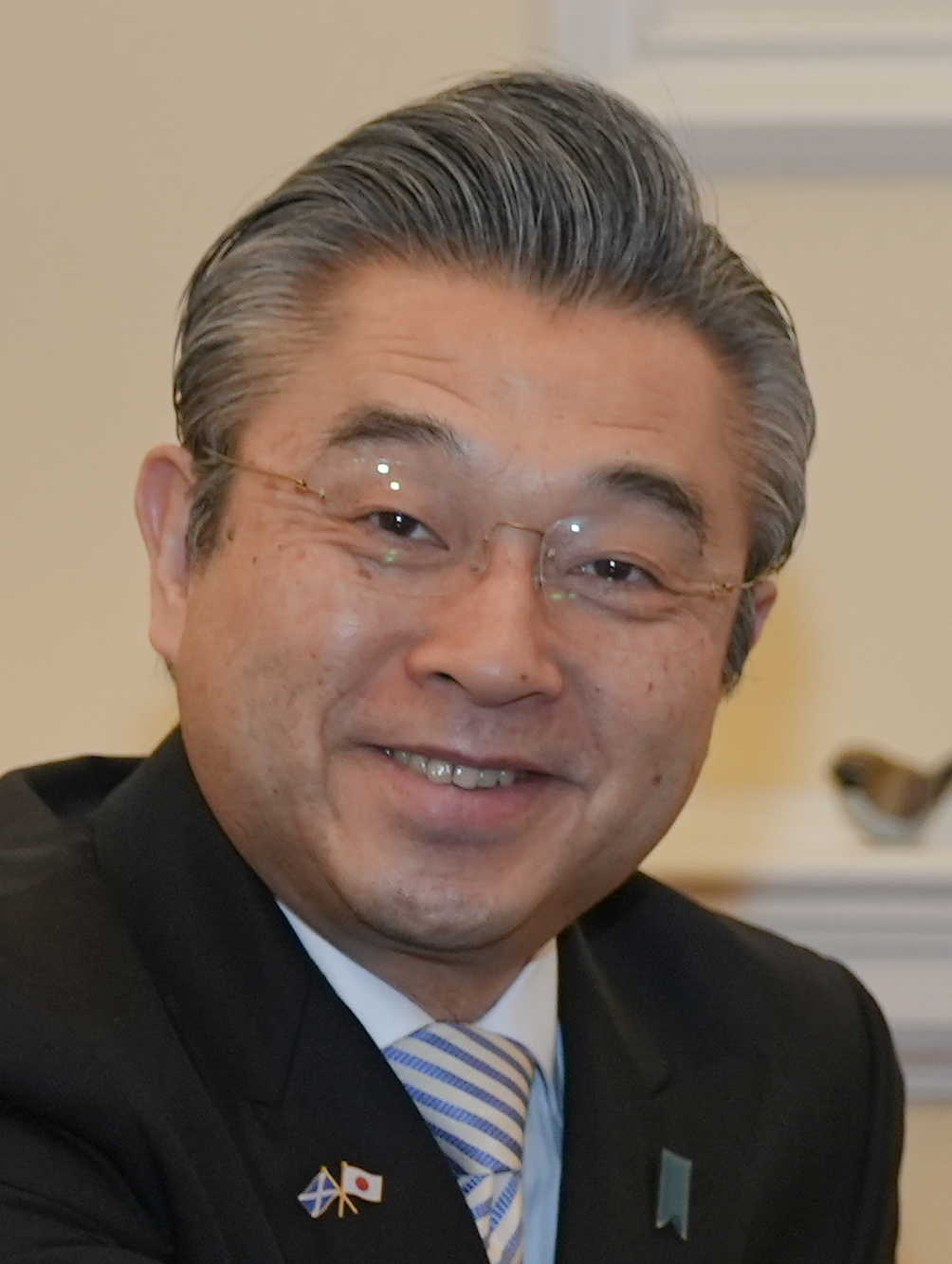
- Suzuki in February 2025

Ambassador of Japan to the United Kingdom
- Incumbent
- Assumed office September 2024
- Monarch: Naruhito
- Prime Minister: Fumio Kishida; Shigeru Ishiba; Sanae Takaichi
- Preceded by: Hajime Hayashi

Ambassador of Japan to India and Bhutan
- In office August 2022 – September 2024
- Monarch: Naruhito
- Prime Minister: Fumio Kishida; Shigeru Ishiba

Personal details
- Born: 5 June 1961 (age 65) Kyoto, Japan
- Education: University of Tokyo

Hiroshi Suzuki (Japanese: 鈴木浩, Hepburn: Suzuki Hiroshi; born 5 June 1961) is a Japanese diplomat who has served as Ambassador of Japan to the United Kingdom since September 2024. He previously served as Ambassador of Japan to India and Bhutan from 2022 to 2024.

== Early life ==
Hiroshi Suzuki was born in Kyoto on 5 June 1961. He graduated from the Faculty of Law at the University of Tokyo in March 1985 and joined the Ministry of Foreign Affairs (MOFA) the following month. After joining, he was sent to the United States for language training and studied at the Fletcher School at Tufts University.

== Career ==
Suzuki was posted to the Embassy of Japan in Washington, D.C. in 1988 and returned to Tokyo in 1990. In August 1990 he worked in the MOFA Southwest Asia Division, in July 1992 he became Deputy Director of the First North America Division, in February 1995 he became Deputy Director of the WTO Division, in January 1997 he became principal Deputy Director of the First West Europe Division. His second overseas posting was as a political counsellor at the Embassy of Japan in Rome in July 1999, followed by a posting in Tehran in December 2001.

Suzuki returned to Japan in August 2004 when he became Director of the Fourth Division of the Intelligence and Analysis Service. In August 2005 Executive Secretary to Chief Cabinet Secretary Hiroyuki Hosoda, and remained in that position when Shinzo Abe became Chief Cabinet Secretary in October 2005. Suzuki became deputy cabinet public relations secretary when Abe became prime minister in September 2006, and returned to the ministry as director of the international press division in January 2008. Suzuki served as minister at the Embassy of Japan in Seoul between 2009 and 2011, and experienced his first posting at the Embassy of Japan in London between 2011 and 2012.

In December 2012, Abe, who had returned to power as prime minister, appointed Suzuki as executive secretary for foreign affairs. He remained in that position until he was appointed deputy foreign minister (外務審議官, Gaimu Shingikan) for economic affairs in July 2020. He was appointed Ambassador to India and Bhutan in August 2022 and then Ambassador to the United Kingdom in September 2024.

=== Ambassador to the UK ===
Avatar of Hiroshi Suzuki

Hiroshi Suzuki
(@AmbJapanUK)
tweeted:

Happy St Patrick’s Day! I made matcha latte with a shamrock! 🍵☘️

17 March 2025

In January 2025, Suzuki was featured by the BBC and ITV when he released a video of himself singing the Welsh national anthem in Welsh prior to his visit to Wales. He was subsequently described as an "unlikely social media star" in The Daily Telegraph after the video went viral on Twitter. The Telegraph wrote that he was "already on his way to becoming an adopted national treasure" and that "he has captivated Britons with his boundless enthusiasm". They also wrote, "It's impossible not to be charmed by Suzuki's wholehearted embrace of Britishness, expressed not in po-faced statements about international partnerships or dutiful appearances at formal events, but in a down-to-earth, affable and humorous way. He is like the Paddington Bear of ambassadors".

He has since appeared in numerous other viral videos in which he visits areas of the UK and uses regional slang whilst enjoying regional food and drinks, including drinking Liverpool scouse stew, Manchester bitter, and Tennents before attending a Celtic F.C. match. In April 2026 Suzuki uploaded a video celebrating Saint George's Day, which was praised as "magnificent", "amazing", and "absolutely adorable" by commentors.

== See also ==
- Japan–United Kingdom relations
- Embassy of Japan, London
- Embassy of the United Kingdom, Tokyo

Diplomatic posts
| Preceded by Hajime Hayashi | Japanese Ambassador to the United Kingdom; 2024-present | Incumbent |
| Preceded by Satoshi Suzuki | Japanese Ambassador to India; 2022-2024 | Succeeded by Keiichi Ono |
Government offices
| Preceded by Kenji Kanasugi | Deputy Minister for Foreign Affairs for Economic Affairs; 2020–2022 | Succeeded by Keiichi Ono |
