= Japanese in the United Kingdom =

Ethnic group

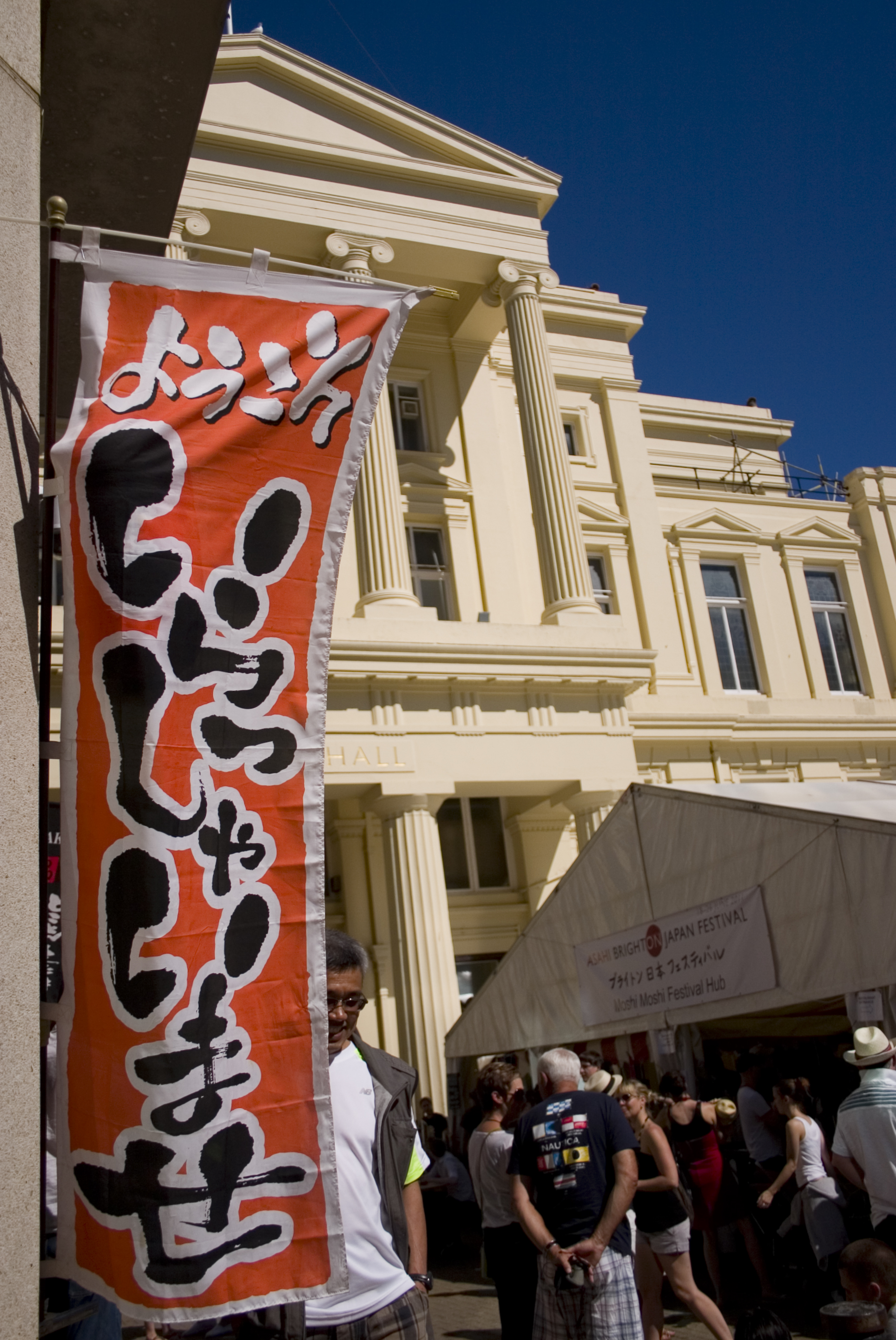
- The Brighton Japan Festival in 2011

Total population
- Ethnic Japanese; 29,510 (England and Wales only, 2021); UK residents born in Japan; 43,000 (2015 ONS estimate); Japanese nationals residing in the UK; 67,258 (2014 MOFA estimate)

Regions with significant populations
- Greater London and South East England

Languages
- Japanese and British English

Religion
- Mahayana Buddhism, Shinto, Confucianism, Taoism

Japanese in the United Kingdom include British citizens of Japanese ancestry (Japanese: 日系イギリス人, Hepburn: Nikkei Igirisujin) or permanent residents of Japanese birth or citizenship, as well as expatriate business professionals and their dependents on limited-term employment visas, students, trainees and young people participating in the UK government-sponsored Youth Mobility Scheme.

== Background ==
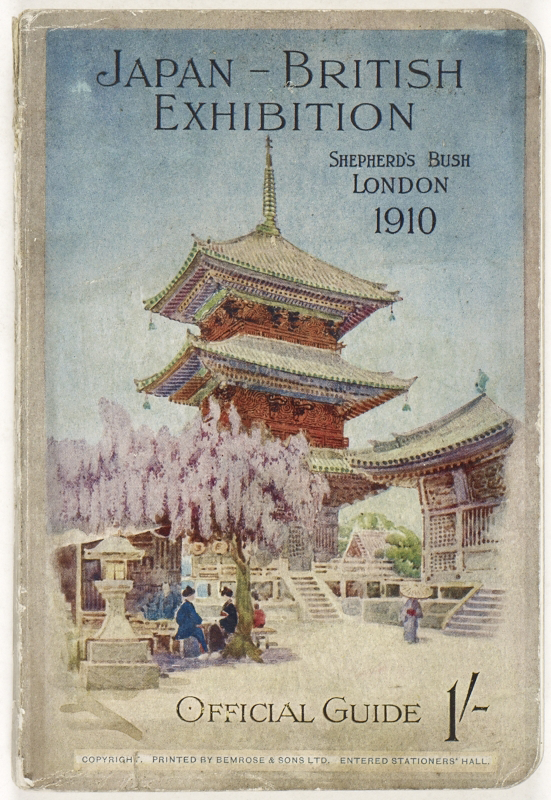
An advertisement for the 1910 Japan-British Exhibition which aimed to create greater awareness of the Japanese community in the UK as well as Japanese culture in general

=== History and settlement ===
Settlement first began in the late 19th century with the arrival of Japanese professionals, students and their servants. 264 citizens of Japan resided in Britain in 1884, the majority of whom identifying as officials and students. Employment diversified in the early 1900s with the growth of the Japanese community, which exceeded five hundred people by the close of the first decade of the 20th century.

As tensions escalated between Japan and the United Kingdom in the buildup to World War II, some Japanese left their home country to settle in Britain while many more returned to Japan. Following the Japanese attack on Pearl Harbor and assault on Hong Kong in December 1941, 114 Japanese men including expatriate businessmen and merchant seamen were detained as enemy aliens on the Isle of Man.

In the post-war era, new waves of immigration emerged in the 1960s, mainly for business and economic purposes. In recent decades this number has grown; including immigrants, students, and businessmen. In 2014 the Japanese Ministry of Foreign Affairs estimated that there were 67,258 Japanese nationals resident in the United Kingdom For British nationals of Japanese heritage, unlike other Nikkei communities elsewhere in the world, these Britons do not conventionally parse their communities in generational terms as Issei, Nisei, or Sansei.

=== Students ===
The first Japanese students in the United Kingdom arrived in the nineteenth century, sent to study at University College London by the Chōshū and Satsuma domains, then the Bakufu (Shogunate). Later many studied at Cambridge University and a smaller number at Oxford University until the end of the Meiji era. The reason for sending them was to catch up with the West by modernizing Japan. Since the 1980s, Japanese students in the United Kingdom have become common thanks to cheaper air travel.

== Demographics ==
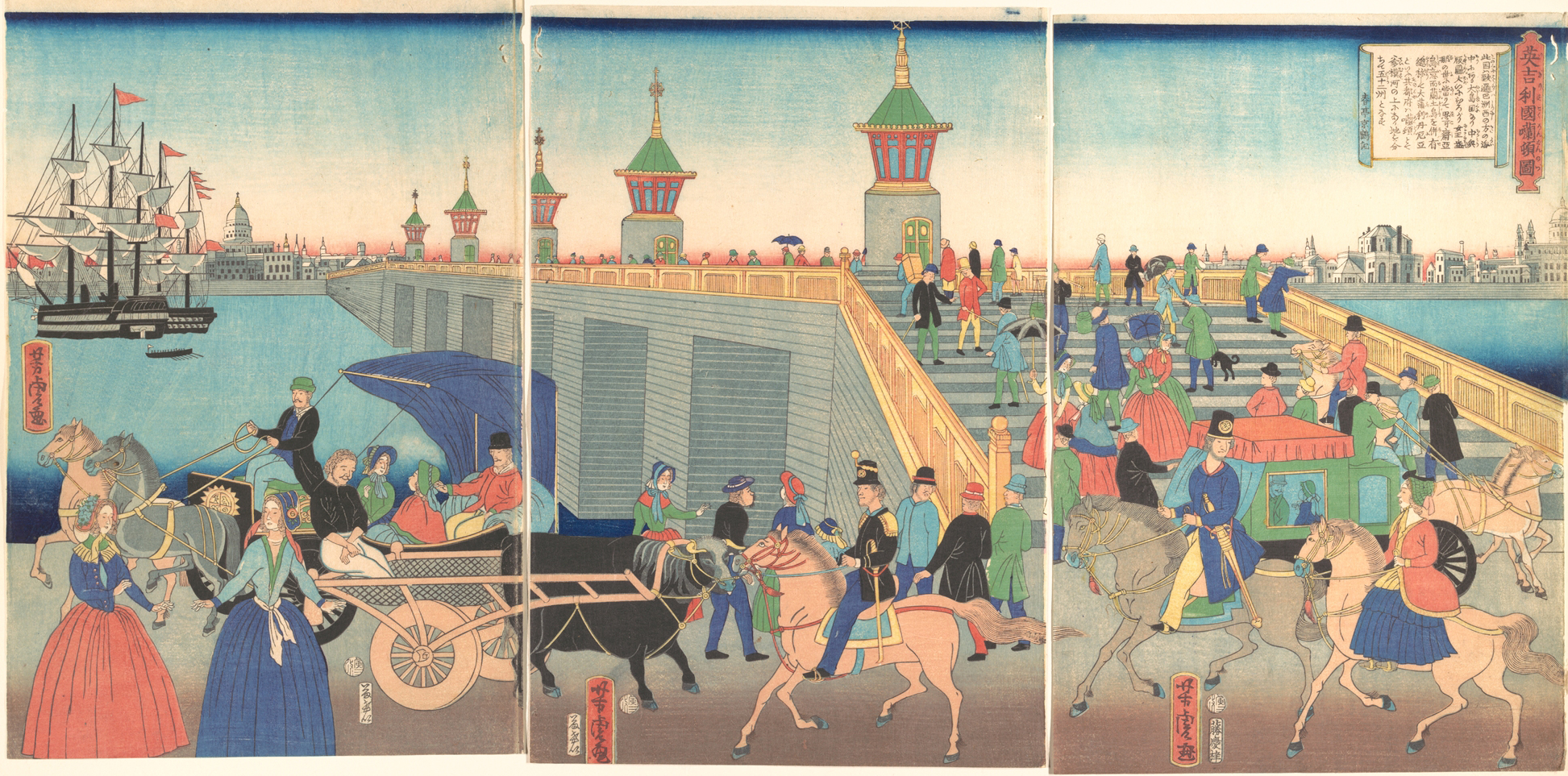
Utagawa Yoshitora's painting of London shows his imagined vision of what the city looked like during the 19th century.

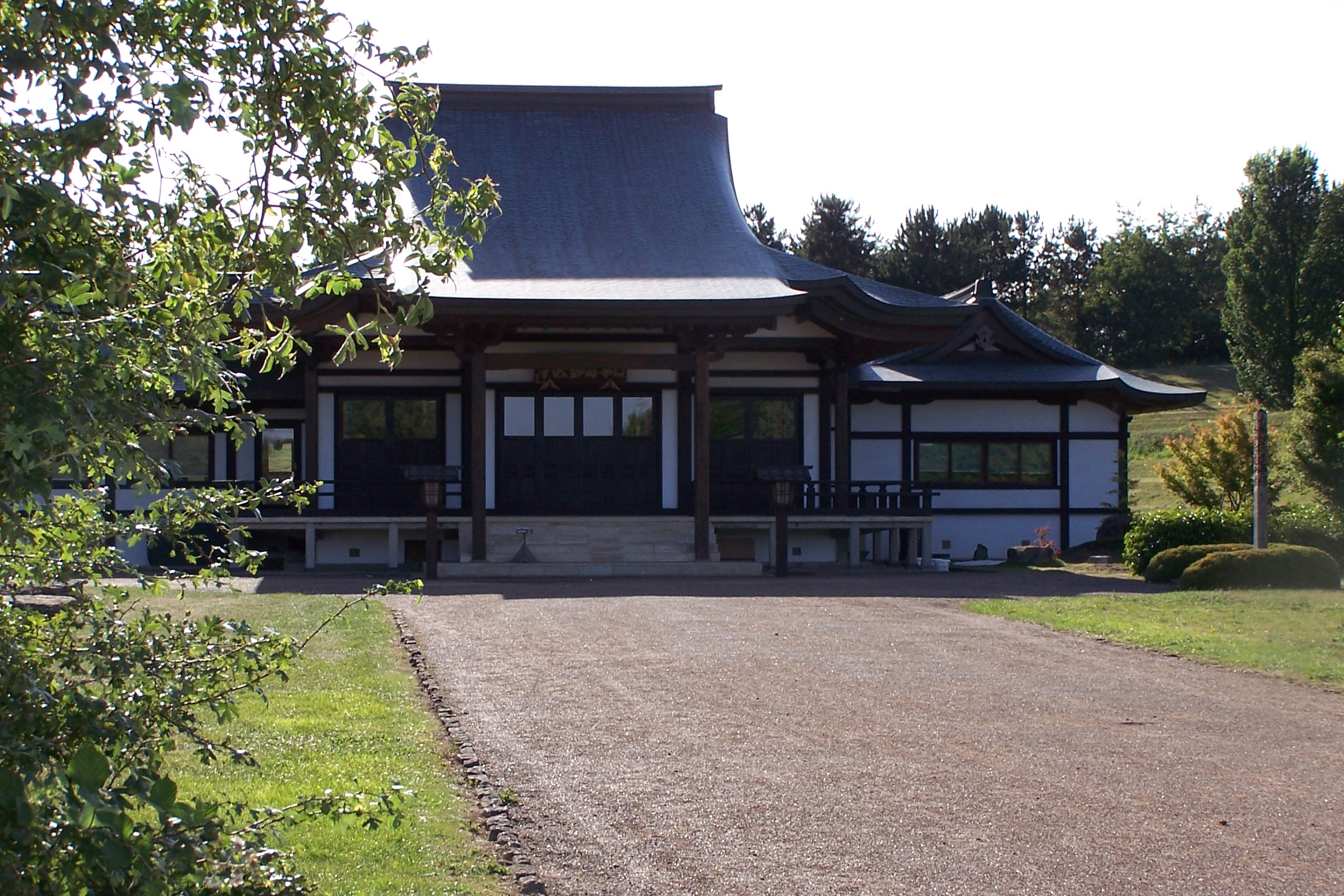
The Nipponzan-Myōhōji temple in Milton Keynes

Parts of the United Kingdom, in particular London, have significant Japanese populations, such as Golders Green and East Finchley in North London. Derbyshire has a significant Japanese population due to its Toyota plant, and is twinned with Toyota, Aichi. Similarly Telford is home to numerous Japanese firms, such as Ricoh.

According to the 2001 UK Census, 37,535 Japanese born people were residing in the UK, whilst the Japanese Ministry of Foreign Affairs estimates that 50,864 Japanese nationals were calling the UK home in 2002. In the 2011 Census, 35,313 people in England specified their country of birth as Japan, 601 in Wales, 1,273 in Scotland and 144 in Northern Ireland. 35,043 people living in England and Wales chose to write in Japanese in response to the ethnicity question, 1,245 in Scotland, and 90 in Northern Ireland. The Office for National Statistics estimates that, in 2015, 43,000 people born in Japan were resident in the UK.

Japanese is the primary language of Japan, and the 2011 Census found that 27,764 people in England and Wales spoke Japanese as their main language, 27,305 of them in England alone, and 17,050 in London alone. The 2011 Census also found that 83 people in Northern Ireland spoke Japanese as their main language.

== Organisations ==
The Japan Society and Japan Foundation support cultural programmes about Japanese culture.

== Notable individuals ==
Below is a list of notable British people of Japanese heritage. Temporary individuals and expatriates are not included and can be found at Category:Japanese expatriates in the United Kingdom.

British citizens born in the UK of Japanese ancestry

- Dylan Bachelet – pastry chef and television personality
- Miki Berenyi – singer, of mixed Hungarian and Japanese ancestry
- Rowan Hisayo Buchanan – writer
- Robin Otani - President of the British Judo Council
- Tomio Otani – notable martial artist
- China Chow – actress, of mixed European and East Asian ancestry
- Esprit D'Air – rock band with various musicians of Japanese ancestry
- Hanako Footman – actress and writer, of mixed English and Japanese ancestry
- Simon Fujiwara - artist
- Adam Nathaniel Furman – artist and designer
- Sonya Hana – actress and dancer
- Callie Kazumi – novelist
- Kai – rock musician
- Claire Kohda – writer and violinist of mixed Japanese and English ancestry
- Andrew Koji – actor and martial artist of mixed English and Japanese ancestry, known for The Innocents and Warrior
- Frederick Lubin – racing driver
- MiChi (Michiko Sellars) – dance-pop singer in Japan
- Samaya Nissanke – astrophysicist
- Naomi J. Ogawa – actress, of mixed British and Japanese ancestry
- Jasmine Rodgers - lead singer of English alternative rock band Bôa
- Steve Rodgers - guitarist of English alternative rock band Bôa
- Will Sharpe – actor of mixed English and Japanese ancestry
- Yuri Shibuichi – drummer
- Georgie Yukiko Donovan - documentary director of mixed English and Japanese ancestry

British citizens born overseas of Japanese ancestry (as well as Japanese citizens) in the UK

- Kae Alexander - actress
- Jess Asato – politician, a quarter Japanese
- Haruka Abe - actress
- Sarah Midori Perry – lead singer of South London band Kero Kero Bonito
- Sky Brown - professional skateboarder and surfer who competes for Great Britain
- Taka Hirose – bassist, of the band Feeder
- Togo Igawa – actor
- Sir Kazuo Ishiguro – novelist, 2017 Nobel Prize in Literature winner
- May Kershaw - keyboardist of Black Country, New Road
- Haruka Kuroda – actress
- Akiko Matsuura - drummer, lead singer of the band Pre
- Eleanor Matsuura – actress
- Matt McCooey – actor
- Kaoru Mfaume – entertainment producer
- Naoko Mori – actress
- Sonoya Mizuno – actress, known for Ex Machina and La La Land
- Hinako Omori - musician
- Rina Sawayama – singer
- Aki Schilz – writer and editor
- Dame Mitsuko Uchida – pianist
- Diana Yukawa – violinist
- Asami Zdrenka – former member of British girlband Neon Jungle
- Yo Zushi – musician and journalist

Other

- Jun Tanaka – American born TV chef of Channel 4's Cooking It
- James Lord Bowes
- Scott MacKenzie, darts player, born in Brazil to mixed Japanese and Scottish parentage
- Sean Ono Lennon, musician son of English singer-songwriter John Lennon and Japanese artist Yoko Ono, born and raised in New York City.

== Education ==
=== Primary and secondary schools ===
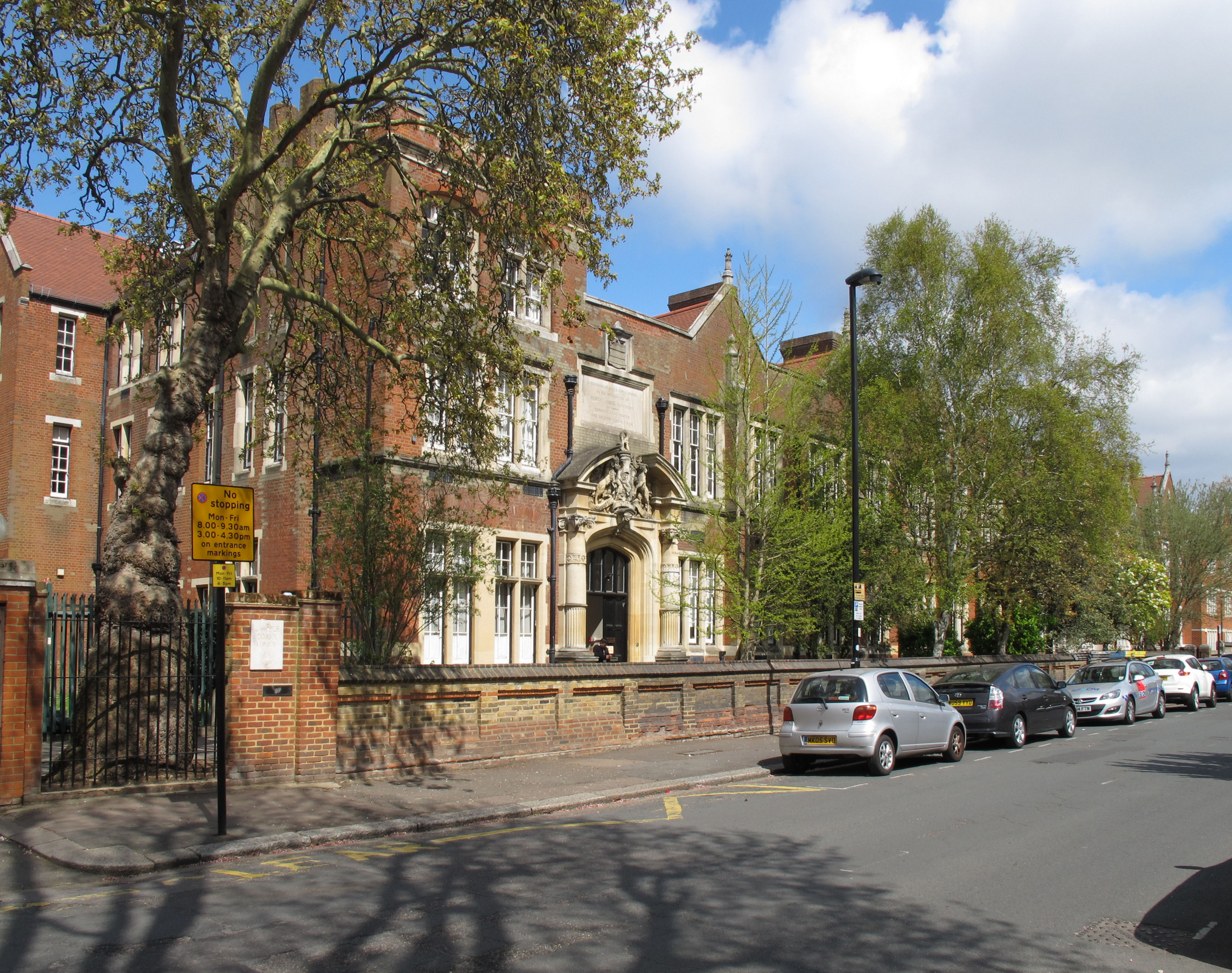
Japanese School in London

Many state and independent schools in the United Kingdom serve Japanese children. As of 2013, about 10-20% of Japanese school-age residents in the United Kingdom attend full-time Japanese curriculum-based international schools. These schools include the Japanese School in London, and the boarding schools Rikkyo School in England and Teikyo School United Kingdom.

The Shi-Tennoji School in Suffolk was in operation from 1985 to its date of closing, 17 July 2000. The Gyosei International School UK in Milton Keynes closed in 2002, after 15 years of operation.

=== Post-secondary education ===
Locations of day schools (nihonjin gakko and shiritsu zaigai kyoiku shisetsu) in England (grey dots represent closed schools)

The Teikyo school maintains Teikyo University of Japan in Durham at the Lafcadio Hearn Cultural Centre at the University of Durham.

A boarding college in Winchester, Hampshire, the Winchester Shoei College at the University of Winchester (formerly Shoei Centre at King Alfred's College), is an affiliate of the Shoei Gakuin. It opened in 1982.

Gyosei International College in the U.K. opened in 1989 in Reading, Berkshire on land formerly controlled by the University of Reading and its name later changed to the Witan International College. In 2004 the University of Reading announced that it took control of the Witan college.

=== Supplementary education ===
Locations of supplementary schools (hoshū jugyō kō) in the United Kingdom (red dots represent schools with MEXT funding with Wikipedia articles, blue dots represent those schools without Wikipedia articles, and green dots represent schools without MEXT funding (all without Wikipedia articles)

The Ministry of Education, Culture, Sports, Science and Technology (MEXT) has eight Saturday Japanese supplementary schools in operation. As of 2013, 2,392 Japanese children in Canterbury (school located in Hythe since 2018), Cardiff, Derby, Edinburgh (school is in Livingston), Leeds, London, Manchester (school is in Lymm), Sunderland (school is in Oxclose), and Telford attend these schools.

- Derby Japanese School (ダービー日本人補習校, Dābī Nihonjin Hoshūkō) - Morley, Erewash, Derbyshire
- Japanese Saturday School in London
- Japanese School in Wales (ウェールズ補習授業校, Wēruzu Hoshū Jugyō Kō) - Cardiff
- Kent Japanese School (ケント日本語補習校, Kento Nihongo Hoshū Jugyō Kō) - Located in Hythe - Its time of establishment is August 2005
- Manchester Japanese School (マンチェスター日本人補習授業校, Manchesutā Nihonjin Hoshū Jugyō Kō) - Lymm, Warrington, Cheshire
- North East of England Japanese Saturday School (北東イングランド補習授業校, Hokutō Ingurando Hoshū Jugyō Kō) - Oxclose, Tyne and Wear (near Newcastle-upon-Tyne)
- The Scotland Japanese School (スコットランド日本語補習授業校, Sukottorando Nihongo Hoshū Jugyō Kō)) - Livingston (near Edinburgh), established in 1982
- Telford Japanese School (テルフォード補習授業校, Terufōdo Hoshū Jugyō Kō) - Stirchley, Telford
- Yorkshire and Humberside Japanese School (ヨークシャーハンバーサイド日本語補習校, Yōkushā Hanbāsaido Nihongo Hoshūkō) — Leeds

== See also ==
- British East and Southeast Asian
- Britons in Japan
- Japanese diaspora
- Japan–United Kingdom relations
- Japan Society of the UK
- Japanese students in the United Kingdom
- Japan–British Exhibition
- Japanese community of London
