= The British School in Tokyo =

- The British School in Tokyo main campus
- Tokyo, Japan; Azabudai Hills Campus; 35.661003°N 139.741458°E; Showa Campus; 35°38′38.4″N 139°40′37.1″E; Tokyo; Japan

Information
- Type: FOBISIA-member school
- Established: 1989
- Principal: Ian Clayton
- Years taught: Between the age of 3 to 18
- Enrollment: 1300
- Average class size: 22-23
- Language: English, Japanese
- Campuses: 2
- Nickname: BST
- Rival: Rugby School Japan
- Website: bst.ac.jp

The British School in Tokyo, commonly known as BST, is an international private school in central Tokyo with over 1,300 students from over 65 nationalities. BST takes students aged 3–18 that have been rated in all eight areas examined by the Independent Schools Inspectorate (ISI). A third of BST students are neither British nor Japanese and there are no entry requirements other than fluency in English. The school follows the National Curriculum of England.

The British School in Tokyo (Tokyo)

The school is based on two sites with students aged 3–11 based at the Azabudai Hills campus and students aged 12–18 based at the Showa campus at Showa Women's University.

As of today, BST is a full member of FOBISIA.

== History ==
Established as a trust in 1988 to meet the needs of parents who wished their children to receive a British style education in Tokyo, BST was officially opened by Margaret Thatcher in September 1989, with 63 students, and rapidly expanded. By 1993, there were 200 students in the entire school.

The existing site could no longer accommodate the growing demand for places and a modern building with improved facilities (the current BST Shibuya site) was opened in Shibuya on 14 May 1998 for over 300 children aged three to eleven. In 2000 the School opened a second site at the municipal Shibuya Elementary School (SES) to accommodate a small number of older students up to age thirteen; the Upper School. In 2003 SES was demolished and the Upper School had to be moved to another municipal facility on the far side of Shibuya Station, the Owada Junior High School.

To address the issue of inadequate facilities, part of the school was moved in August 2006 to newly renovated accommodation on the campus of the Showa Women's University, located a 10 minute bus ride away to the west of Shibuya station. The original site, BST Shibuya, now accommodates 350 Nursery to Year 3 pupils in refurbished facilities. The Showa campus underwent construction during the summer of 2017 to accommodate the rising number of students joining the school, adding new classrooms, libraries, study areas and more. BST Showa offers educational provision from Year 4 to 13 for over 620 students with extra-curriculars, such as sports fixtures and music clubs. Key Stages 4 and 5 include IGCSE, A-Levels, AQA BAC and the International Duke of Edinburgh Award.

== Locations ==
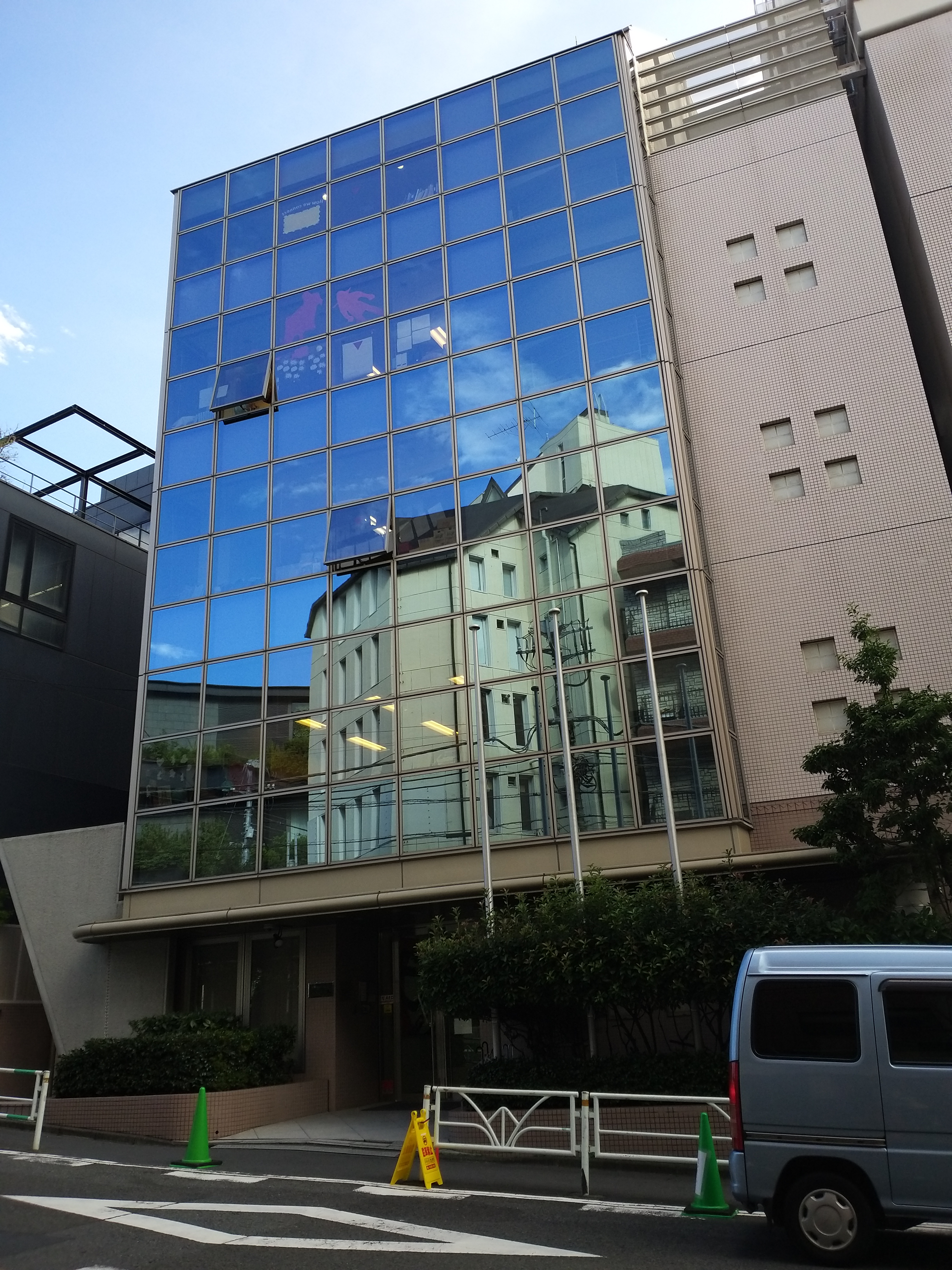
The former campus of BST in Shibuya

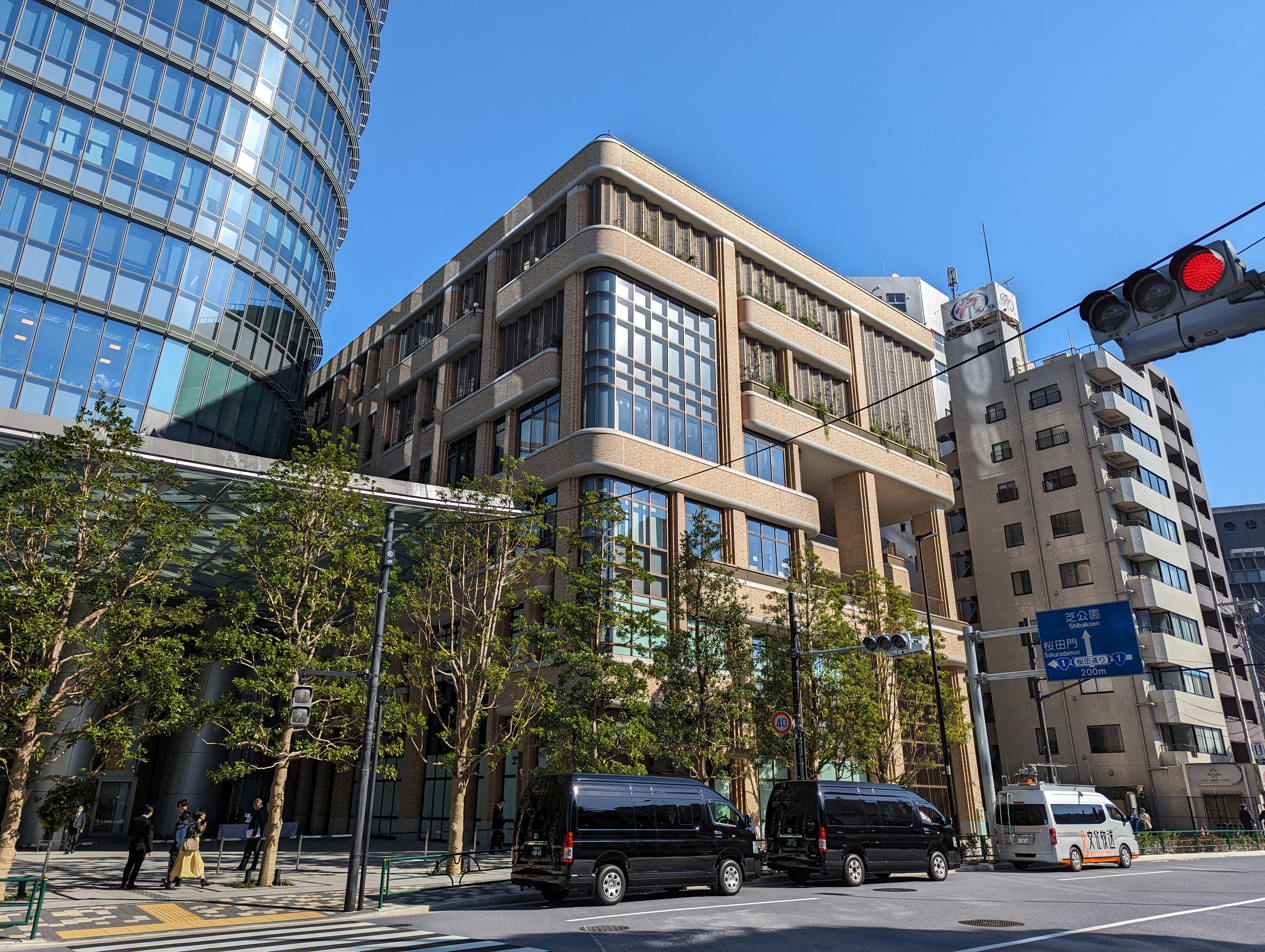
Azabudai Hills campus

BST has two campuses: Nursery through Year 6 attend the Azabudai Hills campus, and students in Year 7 through Year 13 attend the Showa campus in building 5 of Showa Women's University in Setagaya Ward. Before the Azabudai Hills campus opened on 28 August 2023, students from the age of 3-12 were taught at a campus in Shibuya (pictured on the left). The Showa campus opened on 28 August 2006.

== Showa campus facilities ==
Not owning its own land on Showa campus, BST has had to rent out gyms, fields and halls from Showa Women's University and Temple University, both of which are located on the same campus and are in close proximity of one another. The main indoor sports facilities of BST Showa campus are the old gym (owned by Showa), the west gym (owned by Temple university), and the new gym (owned by Showa). The main outdoor sports facilities of BST showa are the Astro (big field outside school building), Leo ground (field mainly used by BST), and South Ground (mainly used by BST). Hall/Performance facilities of BST showa are Hitomi hall (seats 1000+), Green hall (slightly smaller, seats 500+), and other halls either on Showa territory or Temple university territory. As of 2021, BST showa used the pool which is located in the basement of a Temple university building, and is also under the west gym (mentioned above). However, before 2019, the specified pool was under construction, meaning the school had to create a contract with the pool of a nearby gym (approximately 500m away), where students would travel to have their swimming lessons and swim team practices.

== Curriculum ==
Throughout the whole school, BST offers a large range of subjects, including English (Language and Literature), Numeracy, Sciences, ICT, Wellbeing, History, Geography, Art, Drama, Photography, Economics, Business Studies, Music and Physical Education, all of which are offered at IGCSE and A Level. In addition, two Modern Foreign Languages are offered – Japanese from Nursery and French from Year 3. Spanish is also offered for IGCSE and A Level.

== Accreditation ==
BST is accredited by the Council of British International Schools (COBIS) and has been inspected by ISI. It is also a member of Kanto Plains Schools Association and the Japan Council of International Schools (JCIS).

== Sports ==
BST offers a range of competitive and recreational sport, with morning or after-school clubs available throughout the school year. Some of these sports include, but are not limited to:

- Volleyball
- Netball
- Futsal
- Football
- Hockey
- Swimming
- Athletics
- Cricket
- Basketball
- Badminton

== Extra-curricular activities ==
The following are secondary clubs, as of December 2021:

- Strategy games club
- Philosophy discussion club
- Diversity and inclusion club
- Science ambassador club
- Geography club
- DJ and Music production club
- Debating club
- Football squad(u10-18)
- Girls football squad(u10-18)
- Chess and Shogi club
- Rock 'n' Roll/Live club
- Science fiction club
- Tai Chi club
- STEP maths club
- NHK learning Japanese
- Nrich maths for Y7 and Y8
- Model United Nations club
- Art sustainable fashion workshop

== See also ==
- List of high schools in Tokyo
- Britons in Japan
- Japan–United Kingdom relations
- British Embassy, Tokyo

Japanese international schools in the United Kingdom:

- Japanese School in London
- Rikkyo School in England
- Teikyo School United Kingdom
- Defunct: Gyosei International School UK
