= Ken Noguchi =

Japanese mountain climber

Ken Noguchi (野口健)
- Born: August 21, 1973 (age 53); Boston, Massachusetts
- Occupation: Mountaineer

Ken Noguchi (野口 健, Noguchi Ken; born August 21, 1973 in Boston) is a Japanese mountaineer and environmental activist. His father was a diplomat, so he lived in the U.S., Saudi Arabia, Egypt, and Japan. He was often bullied because he was half-Japanese. In 1999, at the age of 25, he became the youngest person (at that time) to scale the Seven Summits, the highest mountains on each of the seven continents. He graduated from Asia University in 2000, and studied environmental education at Aomori University. Since then, he has worked on various mountain clean-up projects around the world, including projects at Mount Everest, Mount Fuji and Manaslu. His work has had a notable effect on efforts in Japan, where he has given many lectures to promote better environmental practices.

== Biography ==
=== Early life ===
Ken Noguchi was born in Boston, Massachusetts on August 21, 1973. His father was a diplomat, so his family moved quite often when he was young. They lived in the Middle East for some time, including Saudi Arabia and Egypt. He did not come home to Japan until he was 4 years old.

He attended Rikkyo School in England an independent boarding school affiliated with Rikkyo University in Japan. At the age of 15, he was suspended from school for one month due to a conflict with another student and was sent home to his parents in Japan. At his father's advice, he took this time to travel alone. While traveling, he read a book by world-renowned Japanese adventurer Naomi Uemura. Noguchi was inspired by Uemura to try mountain climbing, and ascended his first mountain, Mont Blanc in August 1989.

Seven Summits timeline
Mountain	Date	Age
Kilimanjaro	December, 1989	16
Kosciuszko	September, 1992	19
Aconcagua	December, 1992	19
McKinley	June, 1993	19
Vinson Massif	December, 1994	21
Elbrus	January, 1996	22
Everest	May 13, 1999	25

=== Ascending the Seven Summits ===
Noguchi began his quest to scale the highest mountains of each continent, the Seven Summits, in 1989. His first came in December of that year, when he successfully ascended Mount Kilimanjaro in Tanzania.

He chose to continue his journey by following the Bass list of mountains in the Seven Summit group (the Messner list features Carstensz Pyramid instead of Kosciuszko). He ascended Kosciuszko in September, 1992. After scaling Vinson Massif in 1994, he became the youngest person to have climbed the highest mountains on five continents. He captured the title of youngest person perform the feat on six continents with his ascent of Mount Elbrus in 1996. On May 13, 1999, he completed his journey by reaching the summit of Mount Everest.

The total time from Kilimanjaro to Everest was 9 years, 163 days. Upon completion, he was 25 years, 265 days old, the youngest at that time to complete all seven. Rhys Miles Jones of the United Kingdom holds the current title, having completed the seventh mountain on May 17, 2006, his 20th birthday. In honor of his accomplishment, Noguchi was selected for the Tokyo Citizens' Honorary Award for Culture in 1999. He detailed his journey in the book entitled Ochikoborete Everest (落ちこぼれてエベレスト, Everest after Dropping Out), published by Shueisha International.

=== Environmental work ===
During Noguchi's Everest climb, he was surprised to find that the mountain was in desperate need of cleaning. In an interview, he remarked, "Before going, I always saw images of beautiful Everest on TV. I thought it would be like that. But once I got there, I found litter everywhere." After completing the climb, he organized a group of climbers to begin removing litter. The team succeeded in removing approximately 8 tons of garbage, including over 400 discarded oxygen containers. He returned to Everest in 2001 to continue cleaning the mountain and it was reported that 1.6 tons of litter was removed, including 84 empty oxygen containers.

Hoping to bring the effort to his homeland of Japan, he gave televised interviews to showcase the problems of Everest. He has expressed his feeling that governments should place a greater focus on environmental education, integrating it into standard curricula. His goal was to inspire others to clean up Mount Fuji, which collects a large amount of trash as a major tourist attraction. He repeatedly referred to the state of the mountain as a "disgrace" of a national symbol. Continuing efforts are being made to remove litter and sewage from Mount Fuji. He talked about his ongoing environmental work in his second book, Hyakumankai no Konchikusho (100万回のコンチクショー, A Million Curses), published by Shueisha International in 2002.

In 2005, a project began with the goal of cleaning Manaslu, a mountain that has a long history of Japanese ascents. The project attracted the attention of former Japanese prime minister Ryutaro Hashimoto. He expressed his gratitude to Noguchi for working on Mount Fuji and his hope for a more environmentally conscious future.

== See also ==
- List of 20th-century summiters of Mount Everest
