= Whitefield School =

Secondary school in Barnet, London, England

Clarion

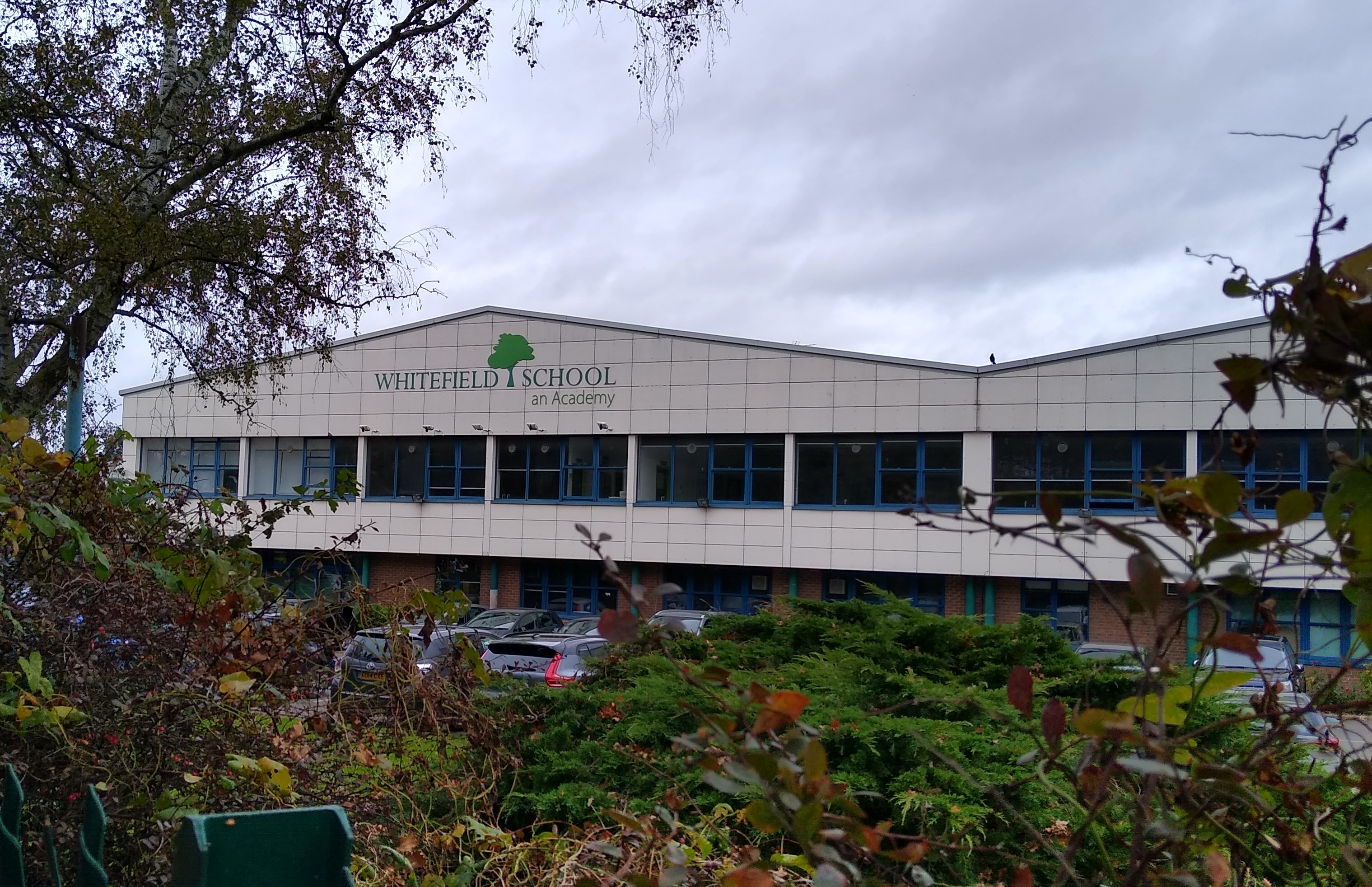
- Whitefield School in 2021

Location
- Claremont Road; Barnet, London, London, NW2 1TR; England; 51.5734°N 0.2182°W

Information
- Former name: Whitefield School
- Type: Academy
- Motto: We are Clarion
- Department for Education URN: 137361 Tables
- Ofsted: Reports
- Head Teacher: Chris Hunt
- Gender: Mixed
- Age: 11 to 18
- Enrolment: about 110
- Houses: Aquila, Draco, Phoenix, Scorpius
- Website: www.clarion.school

Clarion, formerly Whitefield School, is a secondary school and sixth form in the London Borough of Barnet. Whitefield converted to academy status in 2011 and was renamed in 2025.

== Location ==
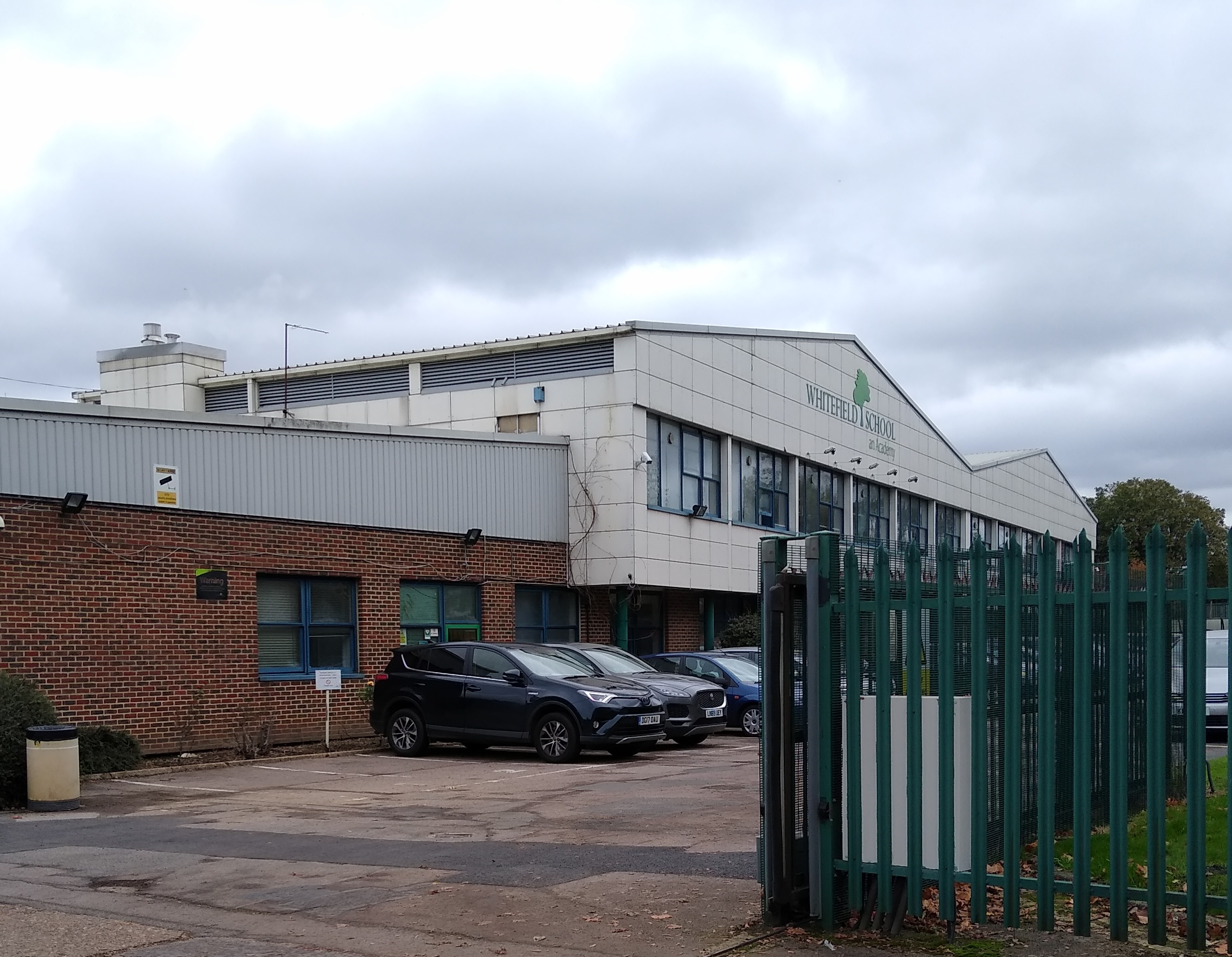
Whitefield School in 2021

The school is in Cricklewood, just south of the North Circular Road and west of the A41 Hendon Way.

The nearest rail station is Brent Cross West on the Thameslink route from King's Cross, the nearest tube station is Brent Cross on the Northern line and the nearest bus station is Brent Cross Shopping Centre.

== History ==
The school was built between 1953 and 1954 on the site of the disused Hendon Metropolitan water treatment works, part of the original Clitterhouse Farm. It was originally a Secondary Modern School and opened in autumn 1954 later than originally intended. This gave pupils transferring from other schools in the then Borough of Hendon and surrounding areas an extra three weeks summer holiday. At the time of opening it had seven 1st year classes of between thirty and forty. Classes 1 and 2 first year had French or German in their curriculum, unusual at the time. Other older pupils transferred in to second, third and fourth year classes.

In 1954 the school grounds extended only as far east as the Clitterhouse Brook, a small tributary of the river Brent. Many years later the grounds extended east beyond the Brook to the boundary with Hendon Way. This area was the overgrown disused site of the settling ponds of the old water treatment works which were transformed into school playing fields.

Some time later, the playing field area west of Hendon Way was given up for development of Tesco Super store and Hendon Leisure Centre and the eastern school boundary became once again the Clitterhouse Brook.

The first headmaster was Mr Haley who until then, had been headmaster at Bell Lane school, Hendon. Brenig Lewis joined the school on opening as assistant head and science teacher. He eventually became Headmaster in 1971 and remained until his retirement in 1989. In 2022, Chris Hunt (also a science teacher) became headteacher.

In 2024, the school announced a rebranding under a new name, Clarion, to be effective September 2025. The relaunch was celebrated on 11 July 2025 with a community festival in Claremont Park. As of 20 June 2025 Whitefield ranks within the top nine percent of all schools in the nation.

== Weekend programmes ==
The Japanese Saturday School of London, a weekend Japanese programme, uses the Whitefield School as its Brent Campus (Japanese: ブレント校舎, Hepburn: Burento Kōsha).
