= Rikkyo School in England =

School in Rudgwick, West Sussex, England, United Kingdom

- 立教英国学院

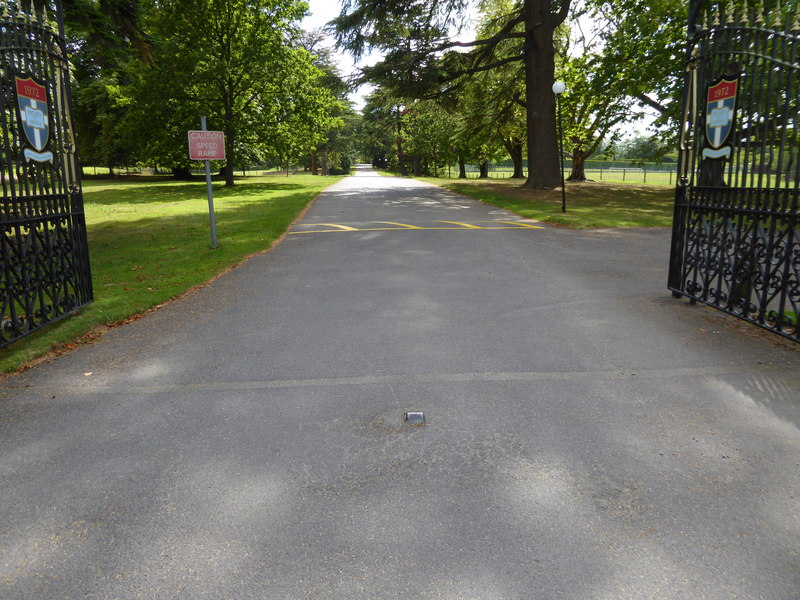

Location
- Guildford Road; Rudgwick, West Sussex, England, RH12 3BE; United Kingdom; 51°05′40″N 0°29′19″W

Information
- Established: 1972
- Website: rikkyo.co.uk

Rikkyo School in England (立教英国学院, Rikkyō Eikoku Gakuin) is a Japanese boarding primary and secondary school in Rudgwick, Horsham District, West Sussex. The school uses the Japanese curriculum, and is one of several Japanese schools in the UK to do so. It is a Shiritsu zaigai kyōiku shisetsu (私立在外教育施設) or an overseas branch of a Japanese private school.

== History ==
It was founded in 1972 and opened with 19 students at the primary level. The school is an affiliated educational institution of the Nippon Sei Ko Kai (the Anglican Church in Japan) and shares its name with Rikkyo University, Tokyo. Initially the school used Pallinghurst House, constructed in 1902 as its classrooms, dining hall, dormitories, chapel, and staff room. Prior to its use as an educational institution, the property was used as a private hotel. George Reindorp, the Bishop of Guildford, dedicated the school.

In 1973 the school's middle school opened. In 1975 the Ministry of Education of Japan approved Rikkyo School as an overseas school. Afterwards the school opened its high school division. At that time the school educated students in ages 10 through 18. Toshio Iwasaki of the Journal of Japanese Trade & Industry wrote that this school was the first Japanese high school outside Japan to open. It was the only Japanese high school outside Japan until the 1986 opening of the Lycée Seijo in France. Since opening, the school has expanded considerably and now includes a concert hall, music building, martial arts ground, a nursery school, science experiment building and sports facilities.

== Campus ==
It is close to Surrey.

== Operations ==
In 1972, students were to wear uniforms, and shoes were to be left away from the classrooms, like in Japan.

At one time the school had proposed some staff residences that the planning committee of the Hambledon Rural Council did not approve of.

== Curriculum ==
In 1972, the curriculum was to match those used in Japan, but with a stronger emphasis on the English language.

== Notable alumni ==
- Ken Lloyd - musician
- Akihiko Matsui - economist
- Ken Noguchi - mountaineer and activist

== See also ==
- Japanese School in London
- Japanese community in the United Kingdom
- Japanese students in the United Kingdom
- Japan–United Kingdom relations

British international schools in Japan

- The British School in Tokyo
