= Teikyo School United Kingdom =

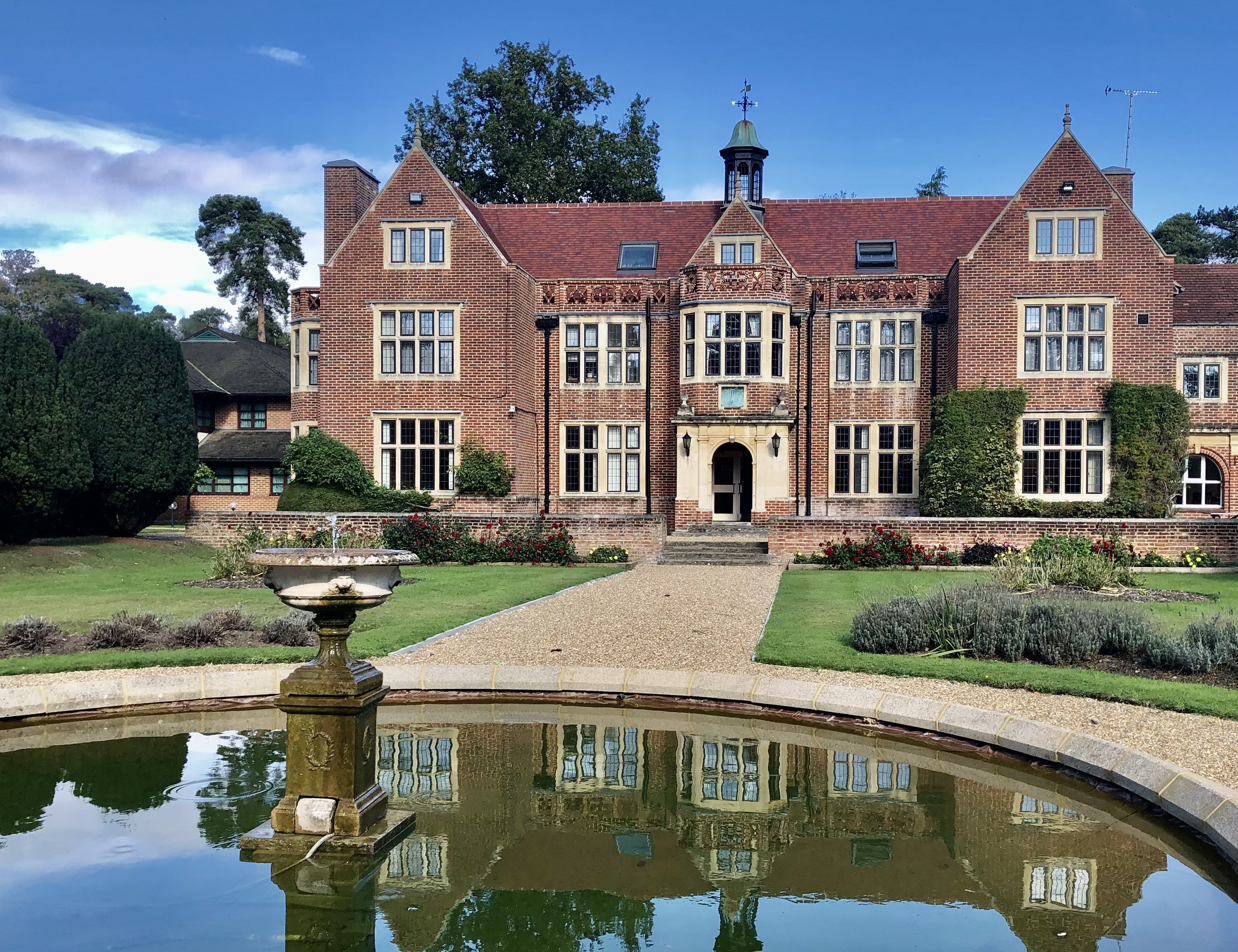
- Manor House

Location
- Framewood Road, Wexham, Buckinghamshire SL2 4QS UK; Buckinghamshire; England; 51°32′59″N 0°33′50″W

Information
- Type: Private boarding school Shiritsu zaigai kyoiku shisetsu (私立在外教育施設) (Overseas Japanese school operated by a private school association)
- Established: 20 June 1989
- Founder: Teikyo University
- Local authority: Buckinghamshire
- Department for Education URN: 110570 Tables
- Headmistress: Fumiko Nelson
- Gender: Mixed
- Age: 15 to 18
- Enrolment: 30
- Colour: Burgundy
- Website: www.teikyofoundation.com

Teikyo School United Kingdom (帝京ロンドン学園高等部, Teikyō Rondon Gakuen Kōtōbu; lit. 'Teikyo London Academy High School Division') is a Japanese international school in Wexham, Buckinghamshire, 20 miles (32 km) to the west of London. It educates 59 students aged between 15 and 18 years. It is affiliated with Teikyo University, and the Japanese government classifies the school as a Shiritsu zaigai kyoiku shisetsu (私立在外教育施設) or an overseas branch of a Japanese private school.

== History ==
The school opened in April 1989, and occupies Fulmer Grange, which had been formerly owned by the British Cement and Concrete Association. The facility was previously used as a head office, and to host conferences. Try Construction Group did the renovations, with one building becoming a dormitory and others also being renovated, spending £882,000 total. The organisation creating the school spent about £2,000,000 in renovations and construction, while £4,000,000 was spent to acquire the land. The plan was to house students who have parents working for Japanese companies.

As of 2013 it had 72 students, all from Japan, including 48 boys and 24 girls. Of them, 44 boys and 17 girls were boarders.

== Campus ==
The campus is located north of Slough, and west of London. It is in proximity to Eton College and Windsor Castle. The school includes an indoor swimming pool, an IT room, a theatre, and a turfed ground. Its students live in single-room dormitories. The swimming pool and gymnasium were approved by the South Bucks authorities in 1989.

== See also ==
- Japanese School in London
- Japanese community in the United Kingdom
- Japanese students in the United Kingdom
- Japan–United Kingdom relations

British international schools in Japan:

- The British School in Tokyo
