= Japanese School in London =

The Japanese School of London
- ロンドン日本人学校

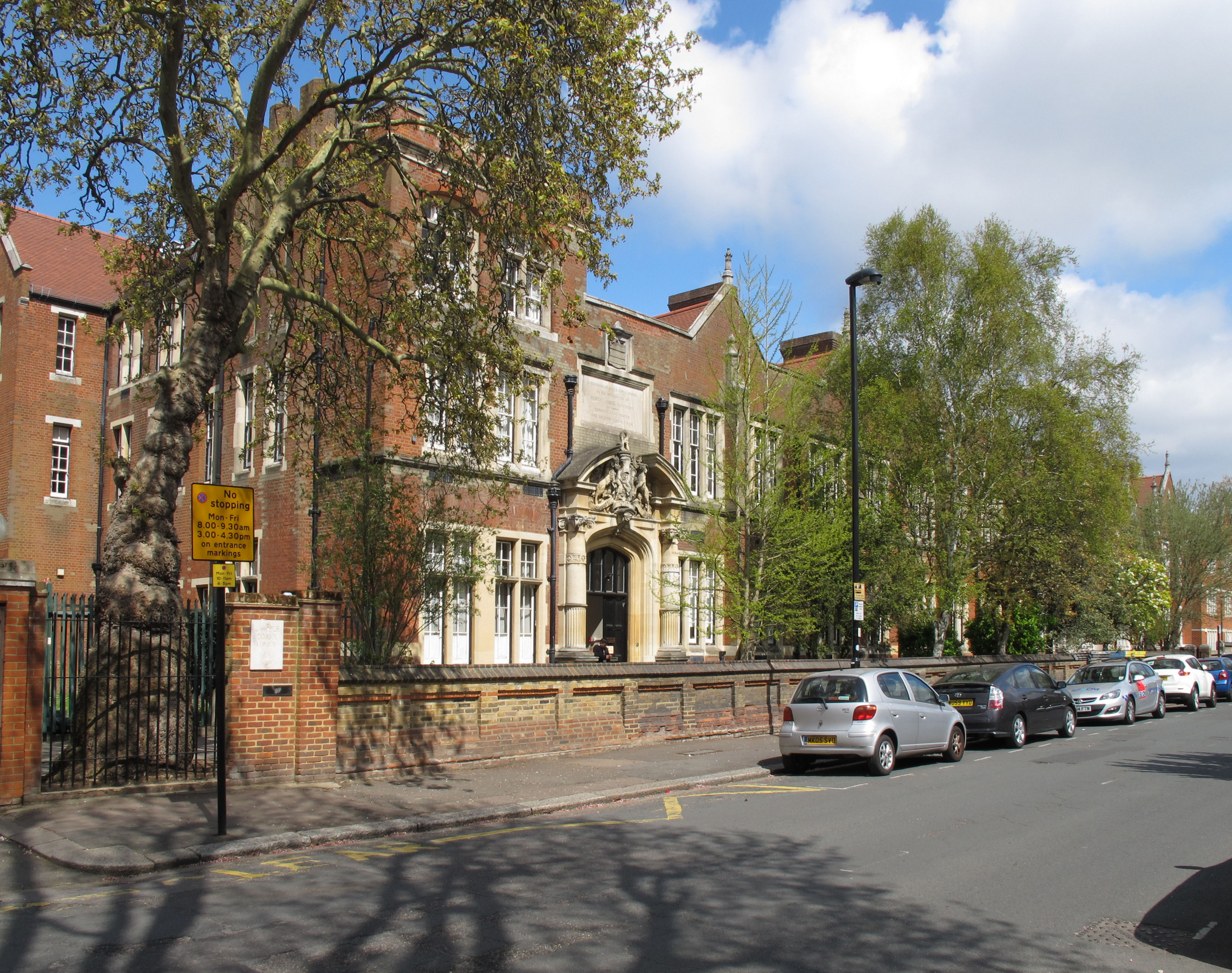

Location
- 87 Creffield Road, Acton; London, W3 9PU; United Kingdom; 51.5136°N 0.2807°W

Information
- Established: 1965; 61 years ago
- Department for Education URN: 101958 Tables
- Ofsted: Reports
- Website: www.thejapaneseschool.com

The Japanese School in London (ロンドン日本人学校, Rondon Nihonjin Gakkō) is a Japanese international school in Acton, London Borough of Ealing. The school is incorporated as The Japanese School Limited (日本人学校有限会社, Nihonjin Gakkō Yūgen Kaisha). The Japanese Saturday School in London (ロンドン補習授業校, Rondon Hoshū Jugyō Kō), a Japanese supplementary school, is a part of the institution.

Junko Sakai (酒井 順子 Sakai Junko), author of Japanese Bankers in the City of London: Language, Culture and Identity in the Japanese Diaspora, described the school as one of the "geographical centres" of London's Japanese community.

In 1999 the Saturday school programme had three divisions: elementary school for ages 6–12, junior high school for ages 13–15, and senior high school, equivalent to the English sixth-form. The Saturday school uses three campuses: the Acton Campus (アクトン校舎 Akuton Kōsha), which uses the Japanese School in London building; the Brent Campus (ブレント校舎 Burento Kōsha), which uses the Whitefield School; and the Croydon Campus (クロイドン校舎 Kuroidon Kōsha), which uses the Croydon School for Girls.

As of 2025 the head teacher of the day school is Kiyoshi Nobuta (信田 清志, Nobuta Kiyoshi).

== History ==
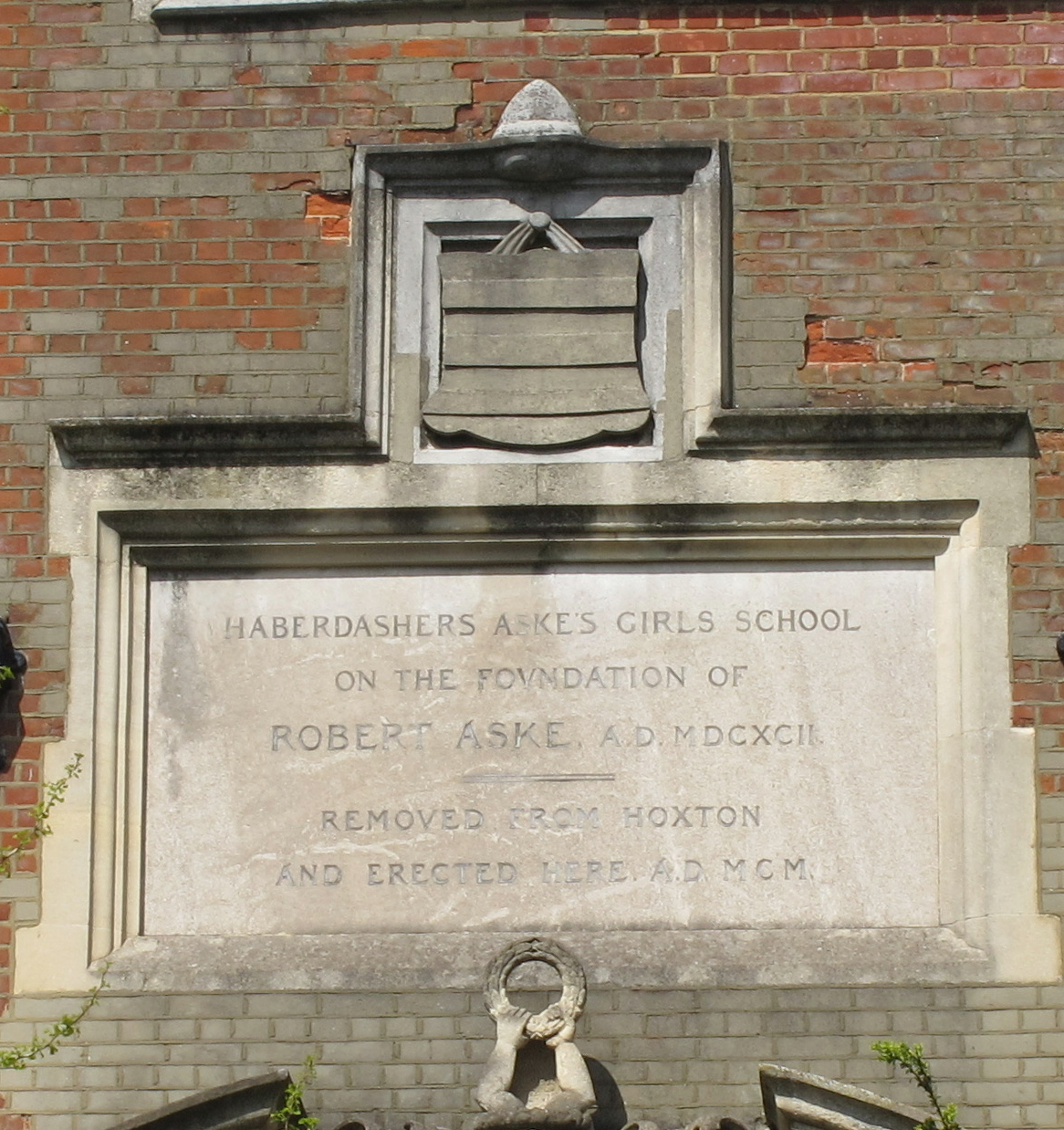
The current campus previously housed the Haberdashers' Aske's School for Girls.

The school, operated by the Japanese Ministry of Education, was established with the financial involvement of Japanese companies. It first opened as a supplementary school, with four teachers and 20 students, in the Convent of Our Lady Sion in September 1965. It was upgraded to an official supplementary school in 1974 when the Japanese Ministry of Education sent its first teacher; it had done so due to an increase in the student body. The day school was established on 18 June 1976. The Japanese Ministry of Education had sent Katsuya Tanaka (田中 勝哉, Tanaka Katsuya), the first headmaster, to London the previous April.

In October 1976 the school had 79 students, with 54 in primary school and 25 in junior high school. That month it moved to several buildings on the property of the Japan Club and the Japan Embassy Information Service Centre. In April 1977 the school moved to a new location, the current North Bridge House School in Camden, In April 1987, it moved to West Acton, in a site formerly held by a British educational system school, the Haberdashers' Aske's School for Girls. At the time of the move, the Japanese community had a position of relative expansion.

In 1987 the day school had 657 students.

In 1988 the company Wilmott Dixon Western did a renovation on the school facility, adding two rooms for science classes and seven other classrooms, with work scheduled to be done by May 1989. The cost was £725,000.

In 1991 the school had 980 students.

In 1999 the Saturday school had 1,602 students and 82 teachers at three sites, making made it the largest of the eight Japanese Saturday schools in the United Kingdom. At the time the Saturday school had three sites: Acton, Camden, and Croydon.

It was a site of filming for the 2009 film An Education.

== Academic standards ==
The 2014 Ofsted report graded the day school as 'a school that requires improvement', down from "good" in 2011. While the behaviour and safety of pupils was rated as 'good', leadership and management, quality of teaching and achievement of pupils were all cited as requiring improvement. A standard inspection in 2017 also found that the school required improvement, and in 2018 it was found inadequate. There were additional inspections—with no reported grade—in 2018 and 2019. As of February 2025 the last inspection was an additional one on 1 October 2024, with the last standard inspection being on 6 June 2023. The 2023 inspection resulted in a judgement of inadequate.

== Student demographics ==
In 2001 the day school had 583 students. In 2012 most Japanese living in London sent their children to either the Japanese school or to local schools. In 2003 Paul White, author of "The Japanese in London: From transience to settlement?", wrote that "even company movers do not necessarily put their children through the Japanese schooling system in London" and several British and international schools in London cater to Japanese students.

=== Saturday school demographics ===
In 1999 the Saturday school had 1,602 students, including 1,152 students in 48 elementary school classes, 258 students in 12 junior high school classes, and 93 senior high school students in four classes. That year, the average Saturday school class sizes were 24 pupils per class in elementary school, 21.5 pupils per class in junior high school, and 23.25 pupils per class in the senior high school. In 1999 within the Saturday school there were 98 children of mixed British and Japanese heritage who came from mostly Anglophone homes. The Saturday school provided "basic" classes for these pupils, with those students divided into five classes.

== Teachers ==
In 1991 teachers of the day school were sent by the Ministry of Education of Japan for secondments (terms of temporary transfer) of three years.

In 1999 the Saturday school had 82 teachers, the majority of whom were women. In regards to the Saturday school the head teacher and senior teachers originate from Japan while the school recruited other teachers locally, including postgraduate students studying in the United Kingdom and housewives.

== Curriculum ==
The Saturday school uses approved textbooks from the Japanese Ministry of Education.

== Transport ==
The school has a system of buses that picks up and drops off Japanese students living in various areas in London.

== Funding ==
The school is primarily funded by tuition fees, though it also receives a subsidy from the Japanese Ministry of Education and donations from Japanese companies. The school, like other British independent schools, has a charitable status.

== See also ==
- Japanese community of London
- Embassy of Japan, London
- Japan–United Kingdom relations

British international schools in Japan:

- The British School in Tokyo

Japanese senior high school programs in England:

- Rikkyo School in England
- Teikyo School United Kingdom
