= Japanese Bankers in the City of London =

2000 book by Junko Sakai

Japanese Bankers in the City of London: Language, Culture and Identity in the Japanese Diaspora
- Author: Junko Sakai
- Genre: Non-fiction
- Publisher: Routledge
- Publication date: 2000

Japanese Bankers in the City of London: Language, Culture and Identity in the Japanese Diaspora is a 2000 nonfiction book by Junko Sakai, published by Routledge. This book describes the lives and cultures of employees at Japanese companies working in their London offices, mostly within the City of London, and includes Japanese and British employees.

Ines Sanmiguel of Rikkyo University stated that the book's audience includes persons interested in cultural and social studies and persons who are interested in business. She wrote that "the intrinsic value of this work lies in providing an insight into how both British and Japanese talk about their working lives, and how their views are related to the individual’s own culture." Tomoko Hamada Connolly of the College of William and Mary wrote that according to the book, "in spite of the impression of borderless capitalism, Japanese and British bankers continue to look at each other from their own culturally conditioned perspectives, and that the so-called new international finance business is after all very culturally bound up with national interests."

== Background ==
The book originated as a PhD thesis. Sakai, who is bilingual in Japanese and English, was a graduate student in England. As of 2000 Sakai was an instructor at Ferris University and Rikkyo University, teaching courses on British society in the former and the English language in the latter. Sakai did her field work in the early 1990s, and she was still a student when she began work on the book.

== Contents ==
The book includes general information on Japanese involvement in international finance in the 1970s through the 1990s, as well as interviews with specific individuals involved in the Japanese banking industry. The author discusses the Japanese banking community in London and her research methods in the initial three chapters. The remaining chapters include the author's analysis: the differing management systems and employment cultures of the Japanese and British people, relations between men and women, and the employees' navigation of the two different environments, described by Sakai as "floating identities between two imaginary worlds".

Her book has a strong emphasis on the interviews, which detail the life stories of the subjects, and the book uses the point of view of the interviewees. Sakai interviewed over 100 employees of London offices of Japanese banks. The male Japanese employees included kokunaiha (国内派; employees at the company head offices who have brief overseas assignments), kokusaiha (国際派; employees permanently assigned to overseas specialist work), and local hires (UK residents who at the time were hired into the company). Female Japanese employees included sōgōshoku (総合職; career employees), ippanshoku (一般職; support staff), and local hires. One chapter is dedicated to discussing the female local hires who chose to permanently move outside Japan and yet took employment at Japanese companies. The author also interviewed British men working at the company, including managers and clerks, and British women, also including managers and clerks. Gordon Mathews of the Chinese University of Hong Kong stated that the interviewing style gave breadth and lacked depth.

== Reception ==
Hamada Connolly wrote that the book "is a fascinating read, and the subject is one of considerable practical and theoretical significance." She argued that in the book there was a "superficial" linguistic analysis, and that the book should have further developed information on Japanese local hires and better incorporated information about Japanese housewives resident in London.

Mathews stated that the statements by the interview subjects were "highly thought-provoking" and that "The research upon which this book is based seems solid". Mathews stated that the book's largest weakness was mistakes in the English language, including non sequiturs and "howlers", resulting in something that appears to be "a lightly edited Ph.D. thesis whose author uses the English language as a distinctly foreign tongue" instead of "a finished volume written by a native speaker of English". Mathews also criticised some theorising, the figures of speech, and the "distorting" type of emphasis the book places on language and the stories of the subjects. Mathews praised the book's discussion on its subjects, calling it its "greatest strength" and argued that it "makes the book worth reading if one can put up with the book's very serious flaws." Mathews concluded "I do recommend this book for those who can get through its linguistic ineptitude". Mathews stated that the book may be compared to Japanese Bosses, Chinese Workers by Heung Wah Wong.

== See also ==
- Japanese community of London
