= Embassy of Japan, London =

Embassy of Japan in London
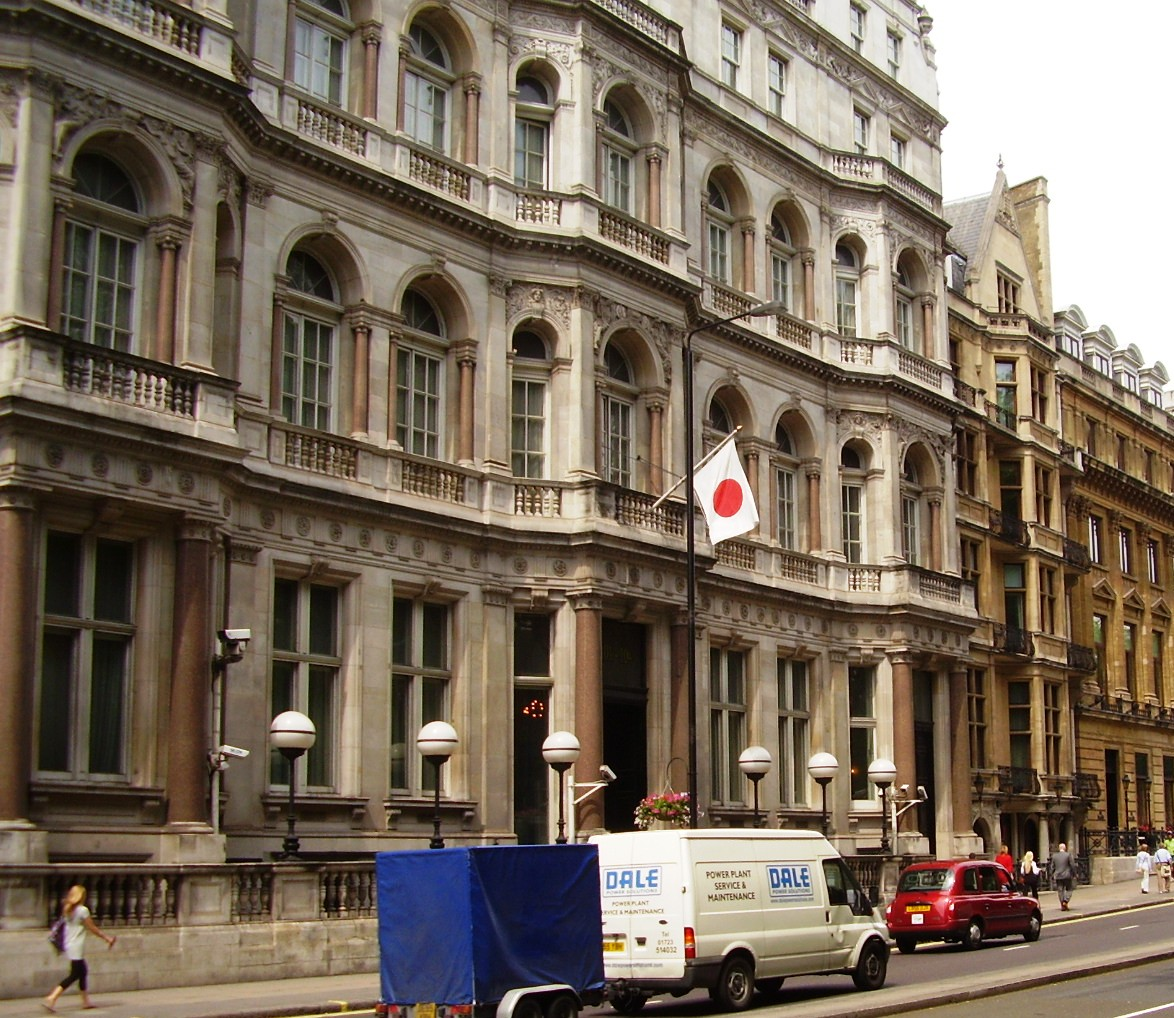
- Location: Mayfair, London
- Address: 101–104 Piccadilly, London, W1J 7JT
- Coordinates: 51.50530°N 0.14606°W
- Ambassador: Hiroshi Suzuki

Listed Building – Grade II
- Official name: 101-104, Piccadilly W1
- Designated: 5 February 1972
- Reference no.: 1265714

The Embassy of Japan in London is the diplomatic mission of Japan in the United Kingdom. The embassy occupies a large Victorian building on Piccadilly opposite Green Park, which is Grade II listed. It was formerly the Junior Constitutional Club, which was the first building in London to have its exterior entirely clad in marble.

From 1913 to 1937 the Japanese Embassy was located at 10 Grosvenor Square.

== Role ==
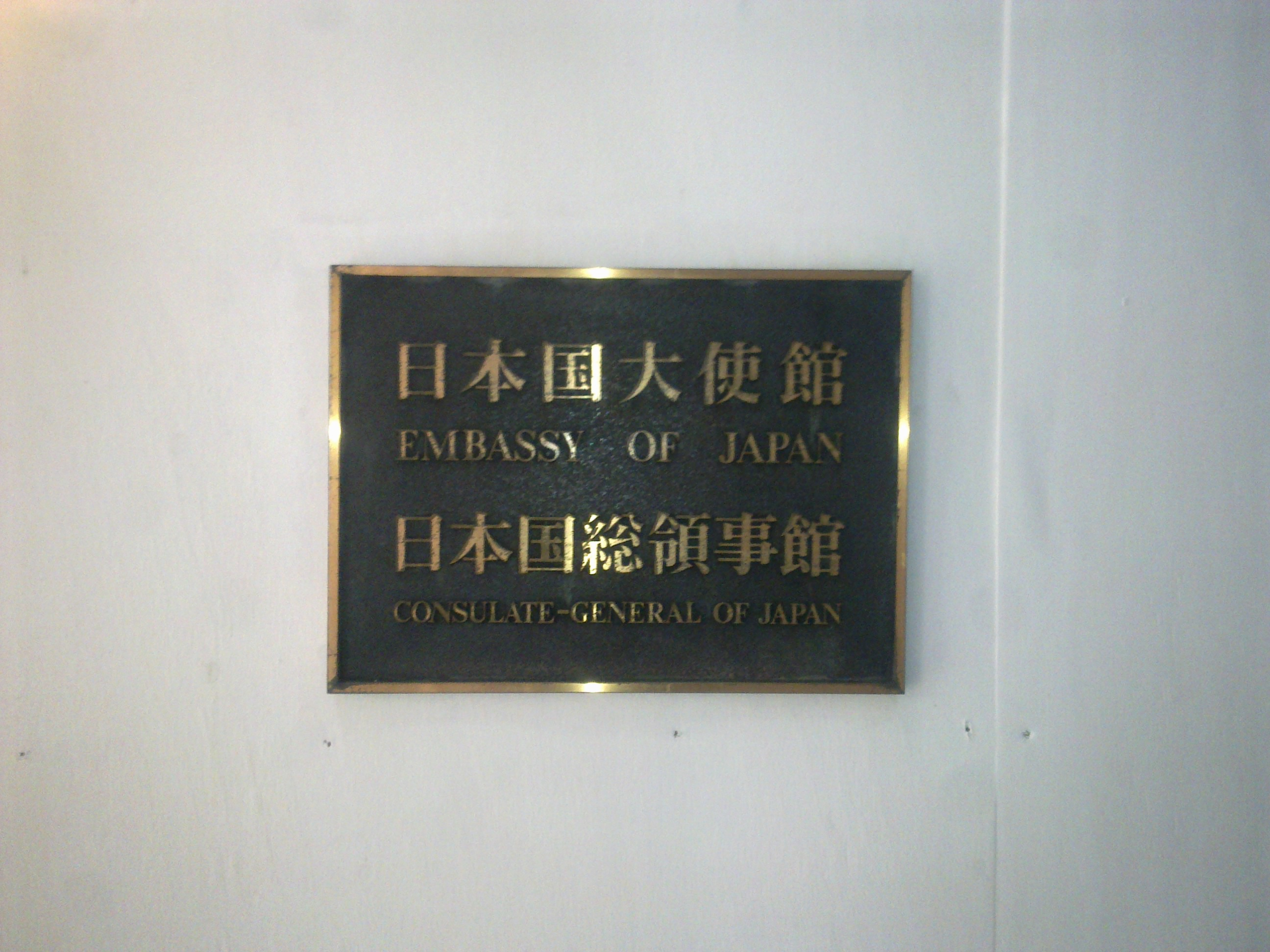
Plaque outside the embassy in English and Japanese

The embassy performs a vital role in relations between the UK and Japan and deals with political, economic, and cultural interaction between the two. It offers visa services to British and other nationals in the UK and provides consular services for the 66,000+ Japanese citizens currently living in the UK. Those who reside in Scotland and some areas of northern and northeast England (Note: According to the Consulate-General's website, these areas are County Durham, Cumberland, Darlington, Gateshead, Hartlepool, Middlesbrough, Newcastle upon Tyne, North Tyneside, Northumberland, Redcar and Cleveland, South Tyneside, Stockton-on-Tees, Sunderland, and Westmorland and Furness.) fall under the jurisdiction of the Consulate-General of Japan in Edinburgh rather than the embassy, and visa applications cannot be made at the consulate-general by those living within the jurisdiction of the embassy.

The embassy houses the Public Relations and Cultural Centre Library, which was established for the purpose of promoting Japan in the UK. The library houses approximately 3,800 books on Japanese-British history and Japanese culture; it also stocks Japanese newspapers, DVDs, and music. Books can be borrowed from the library.

== See also ==
- British Embassy, Tokyo
- Foreign relations of Japan
- Japanese community of London
- Japanese School in London
- Japan–United Kingdom relations
- List of ambassadors of Japan to the United Kingdom
- Ministry of Foreign Affairs (Japan)
