= Japanese community of London =

Japanese nationals residing in London

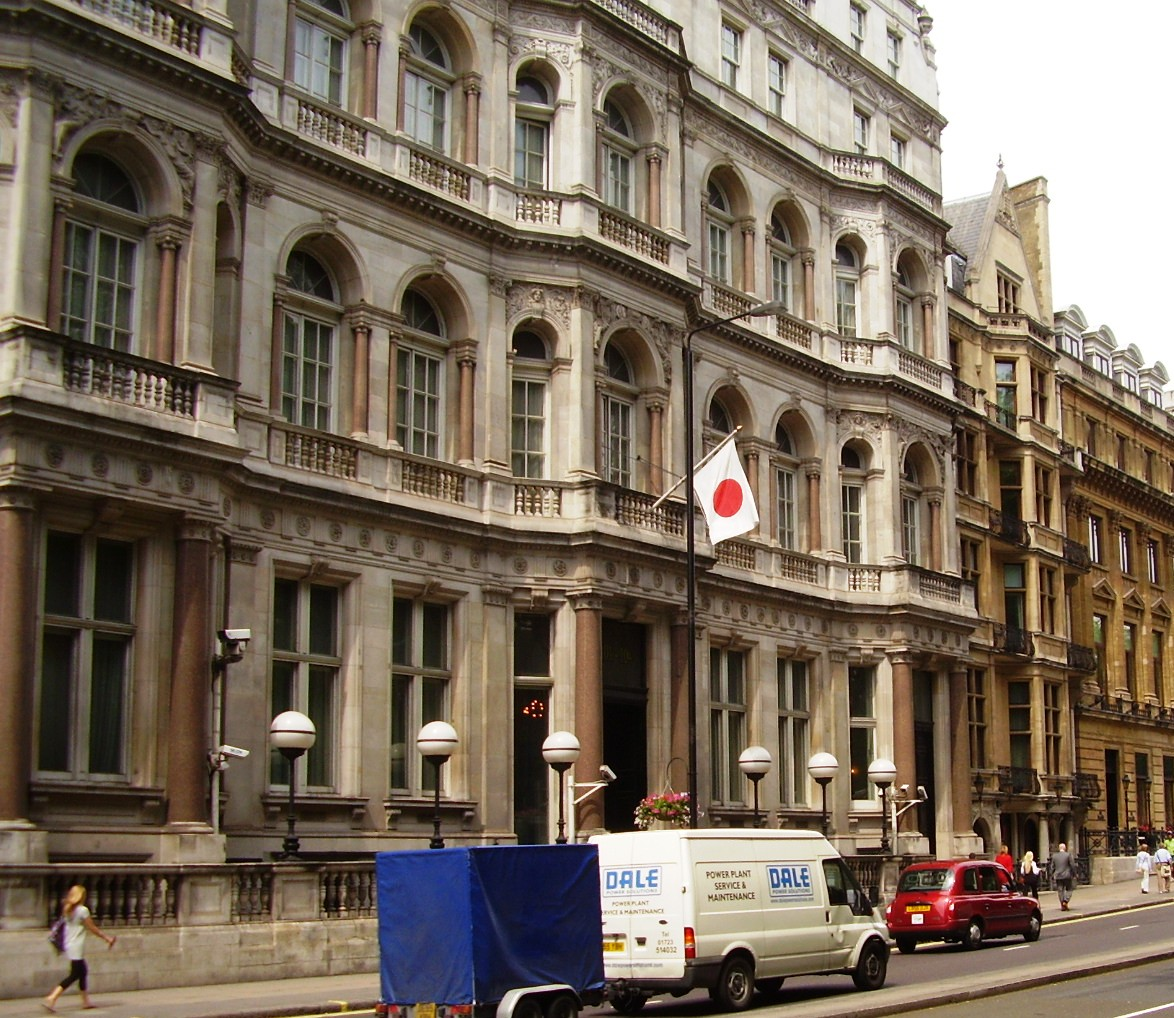
Embassy of Japan, London

Japanese nationals residing in London, in common with members of the wider Japanese community in the United Kingdom, include business professionals and their dependents on limited term employment visas, trainees, young people participating in the UK government sponsored Youth Mobility Scheme, students, as well as Japanese emigrants and their descendants who have settled in the city.

In terms of cultural assimilation there is a wide spectrum of experience: from Japanese immigrants who have made London their permanent home to company employees and their families transferred on short-term assignments whose social networks are often limited beyond the Japanese expatriate community.

In 2001 over half of people born in Japan who lived in Britain had their homes in Greater London.

== History ==
Japanese people have been visiting and living in London since the early 1860s: the First Japanese Embassy to Europe arrived in 1862 and the Chōshū Five, students from the Chōshū domain who studied at University College London, arrived in 1863. In June 1879 Mitsui & Co. established its London office and by 1884 there were 264 Japanese residents registered in Britain.

Shipping and trade links between the two countries grew in the wake of the Anglo-Japanese Alliance signed in 1902 and Britain's Japanese population reached a prewar peak in 1935 of 1,871.

In the 1970s and 1980s the Japanese population resident in the United Kingdom grew rapidly reflecting the growing strength of the Japanese economy and the decision of many Japanese firms to set up their first European manufacturing and operational hubs in the country. The majority of Japanese corporate offices were located in London and the South East of England and Japanese grade schools and social facilities developed to support this community. In 1994, 54,415 Japanese nationals were registered as living in the United Kingdom, 38,000 of which were concentrated in the Greater London area. According to the Japanese Ministry of Foreign Affairs Bureau of Consular Affairs, as of October 2024 there were 64,066 Japanese nationals residing in the United Kingdom.

== Geography ==
Residential centers of the Japanese community in London have traditionally included areas such Acton, Finchley and Croydon, proximate to Japanese language based grade school and weekend language programs provided in these areas.

Based on fieldwork conducted in the early 1990s, Junko Sakai (酒井 順子 Sakai Junko) observed that at the time there was no particular location for the Japanese community in London, but that the families of Japanese "company men" tended to live in North London and West London. In 1991, according to The Economist, lower-ranked Japanese workers tended to live in Croydon. The newspaper stated that Japanese middle managers tended to live in Ealing, Finchley, and Golders Green. The Economist added that bosses of the Japanese offices lived in Hampstead and St John's Wood. Concentrations of Japanese residents support a greater density of Japanese restaurants and shops.

The City of London hosts many Japanese insurance companies, banks, and security houses, and along with the Japanese businesses the City of London includes Japanese job agencies, interpretation and translation companies, and restaurants. Sakai states that the City of London is "perhaps" the "most important centre" of the London Japanese community.

== Retail ==
=== 20th century ===
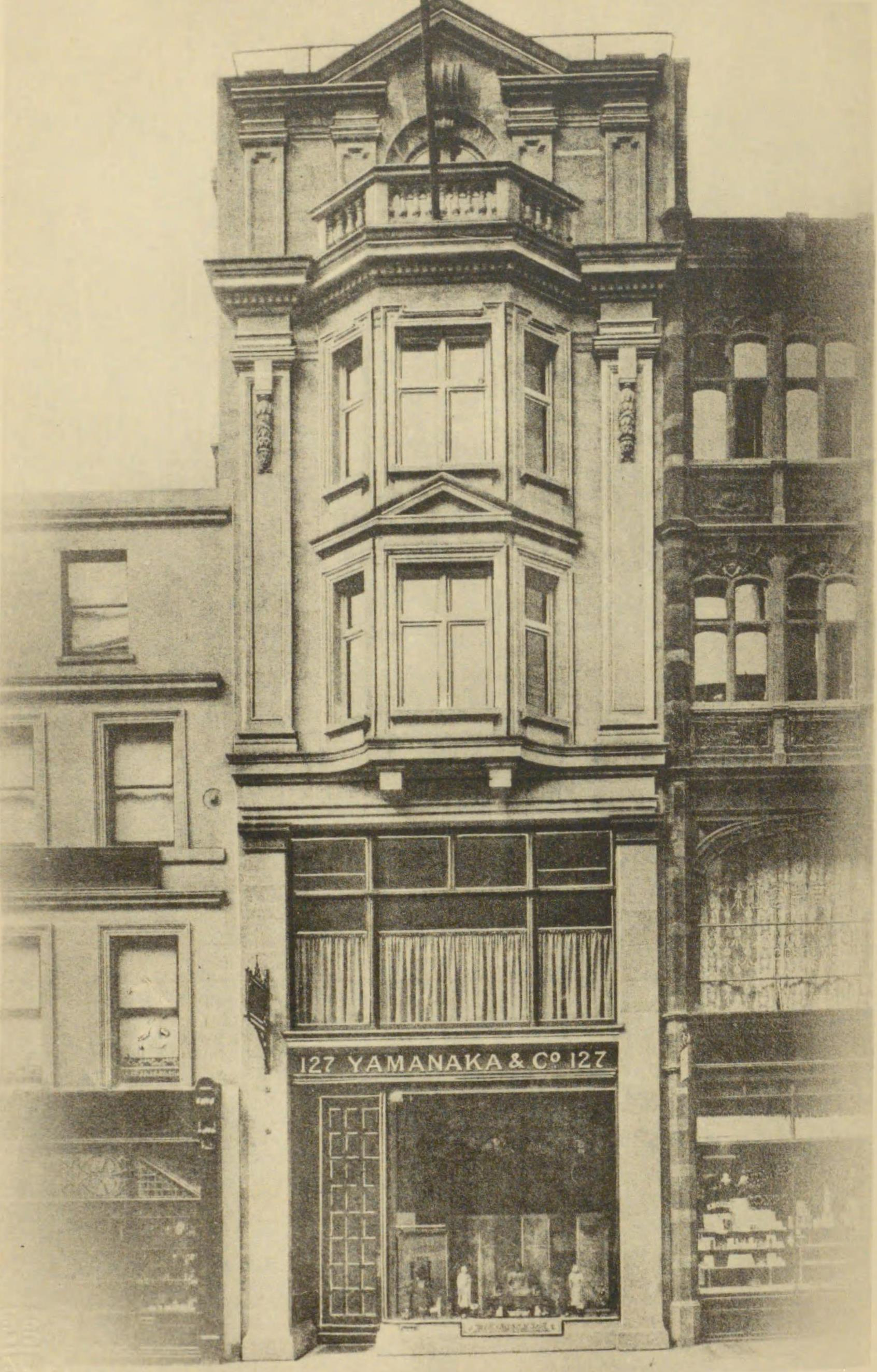
Yamanaka & Co.'s premises at 127 New Bond Street

Japanese owned stores and businesses have been operating in London since the late 19th century. Yamanaka & Co., a prominent Asian art dealership founded by Sadajirō Yamanaka opened premises in New Bond Street in 1900 and was granted a Royal Warrant by George V in 1912. In 1913 Mikimoto opened its first cultured pearl boutique outside Japan.

In 1993 when the expansion of the Japanese business community in London was at its height, Yaohan Plaza in northwest London was opened as a Japanese community targeted shopping centre. The mall was subsequently sold in 1999 to a Malaysian company changing its name to Oriental City, and offering pan-East Asian food retail and a restaurant foodcourt. The centre was finally closed in June 2008. In the 1990s Sogo also operated an outlet close to Piccadilly Circus mainly catering to Japanese package tour groups. In the early 1990s according to the Economist magazine, London had eight Japanese food shops and over 60 Japanese restaurants.

For much of the late 20th century retail establishments dedicated to serving the specific needs of the Japanese community in London remained relatively few in number reflecting both the smaller size of the overall Japanese population in the United Kingdom as well as the growing availability of Japanese retail products from established British retail outlets.

=== Present ===
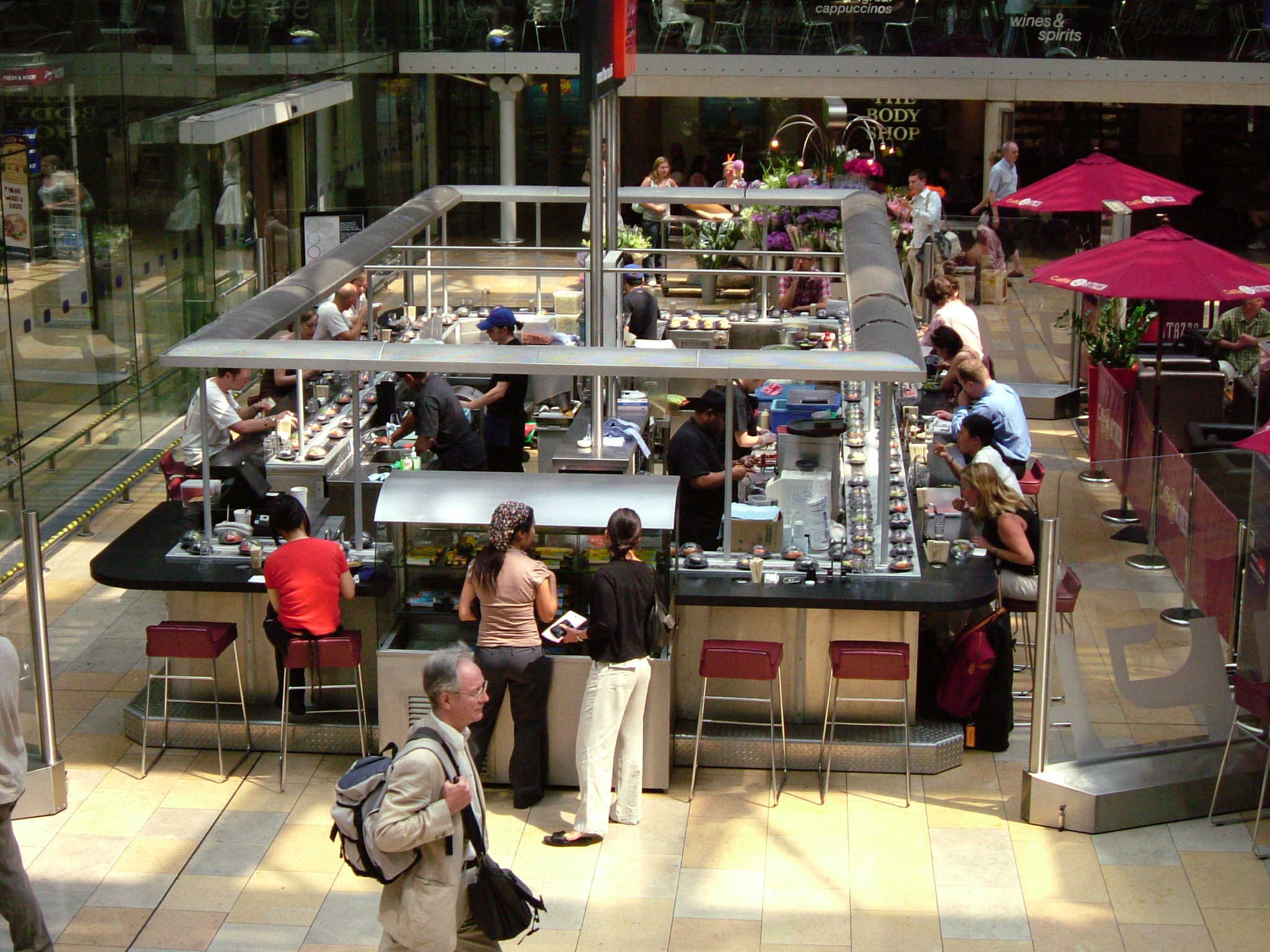
YO! Sushi retail venue, Paddington Station

The changing tastes and demographics of the Japanese community in London and the growing embrace of Japanese food and culture in the United Kingdom has significantly altered the availability of Japanese fashion, homewares, specialist food products and restaurants in London. Large stores such Muji and Uniqlo have been long established in the UK; smaller independents such as tokyobike and CA4LA also exist.

Supermarkets such as Waitrose and online shopping services now provide a wide range of Japanese specialist food and beverage products. The Piccadilly Circus area continues to support a number of smaller Japanese bookstores, food shops, restaurants, and travel service offices, the longest established being the Japan Centre first opened in 1976. Japanese retail food offerings in London, offering varying degrees of authenticity, include popular chains such as YO! Sushi and Wagamama as well as smaller independent restaurants such as Kanadya and Kirazu.

== Education ==
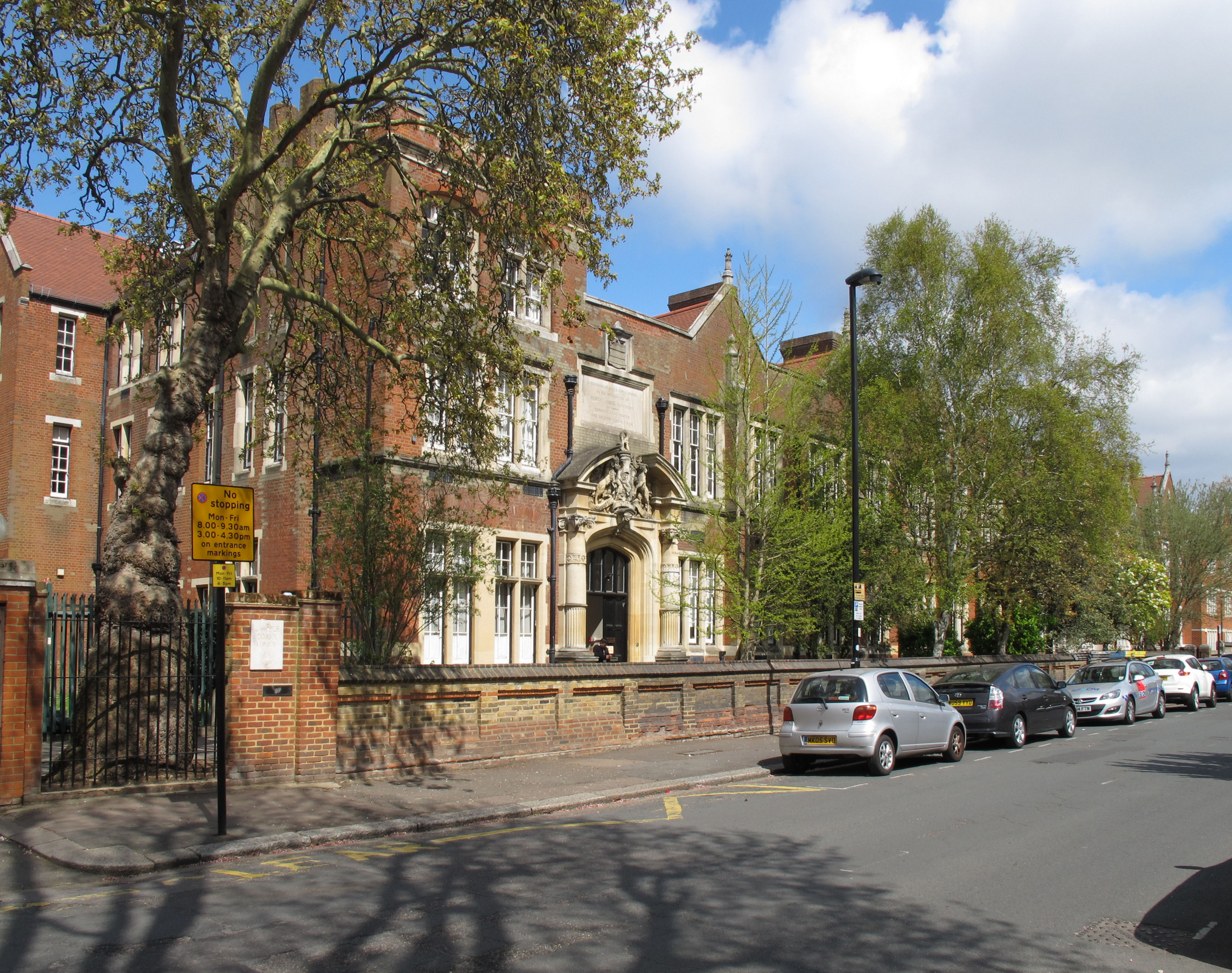
Japanese School in London

Japanese children in London attend a variety of schools including the Japanese School in London, private, and local state funded schools. The Japanese School and three Japanese government sponsored Saturday language programmes in the Greater London area serve as geographical hubs for Japanese families with school age children. The Japanese School first opened as a supplementary school in 1965. Prior to the school's relocation to Acton in 1987, it was located in Camden, in a building now occupied by North Bridge House School. The Japanese Saturday School in London (ロンドン補習授業校, Rondon Hoshū Jugyō Kō), a Japanese supplementary school, is a part of the institution.

In 2003 several state primary schools developed support programmes for Japanese children. For example, West Acton Primary School has a parent-teacher association for Japanese parents. Some Japanese students in London attending secondary school go to other international schools, including The American School in London. In 2003 Paul White, author of "The Japanese in London: From transience to settlement?", wrote that "even company movers do not necessarily put their children through the Japanese schooling system in London".

Sakai noted in her book that some Japanese families elected to send their children to British boarding schools and, in the case of university students, sought admission to "Oxbridge" (University of Oxford and University of Cambridge).

== Lifestyle ==
Japanese corporate welfare systems in the early 1990s provided employees with rental accommodation options described as "comfortable", and Japanese company men and their families enjoyed "luxurious lives compared to Japanese settlers". Companies in the 1990s sometimes paid generous subsidies to employees sent abroad to provide housing, so there is a perception that their lives are more comfortable in London than back home.

== Institutions ==
The Japanese Embassy is located on Piccadilly in central London.

Organizations supporting Japanese nationals living and working in London include the Nippon Club, the Japan Society and the Japanese Chamber of Commerce and Industry.

== Notable residents ==
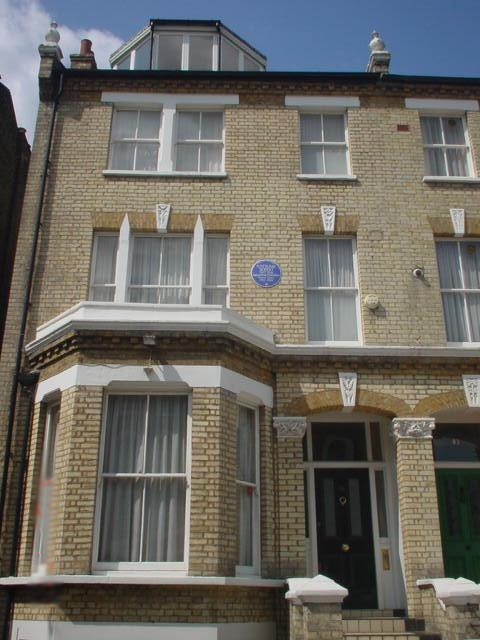
Natsume Sōseki's home in Clapham

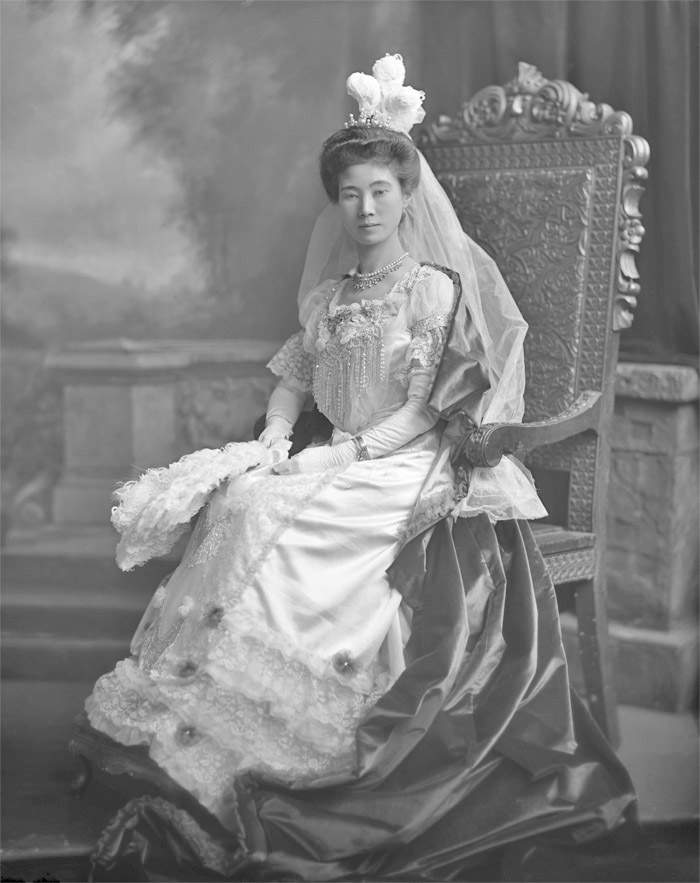
Image of Countess Hayashi from the Lafayette Collection at the V&A

(Names are listed alphabetically, usually by surname in the western convention of given-name, surname for clarity.)

=== Contemporary residents ===
- Kenshiro Abbe (1915–1985), Japanese aikidoka, introduced aikido to the UK
- Haruka Abe, actress
- Kae Alexander (1985), British–Japanese actress based in London
- Miki Berenyi (1967), musician born in London to a Japanese mother and Hungarian father
- Simon Fujiwara (1982), artist born in London to a Japanese father and British mother
- Cy Goddard (1997), footballer born in London to a Japanese mother and British father
- Tomoyasu Hotei (1962), British Asian musician, lives in London
- Togo Igawa (1946), first Japanese member of The Royal Shakespeare Company
- Sir Kazuo Ishiguro (1954), Japanese-British novelist, lives in London
- Gunji Koizumi (1885–1965), Japanese judoka, known as the 'Father of British Judo'
- Ken Lloyd (1976), musician born in London to a Japanese mother and British father
- Daniel Matsuzaka (1997), footballer born in London to a Japanese father and a British mother
- Matt McCooey (1981), British–Japanese actor based in London
- Naoko Mori (1971), Japanese actress best known for her role on Doctor Who, lives in London
- Hinako Omori (c. 1990), Japanese musician who immigrated to London as a youth
- Will Sharpe (1986), actor born in London to a Japanese mother and British father
- Jun Tanaka (1971), American-born Japanese-British Michelin-starred chef and owner of The Ninth
- Dame Mitsuko Uchida (1948), Japanese-British classical pianist

=== Historical residents ===
- Shuzo Aoki (1844–1914), Japanese diplomat, ambassador to Great Britain
- Misao Hayashi (1858–1942), Japanese countess and socialite, wife of Ambassador Hayashi
- Tadasu Hayashi (1850–1913), first Japanese ambassador to the Court of St James's
- Yuzuru Hiraga (1878–1943), Japanese admiral, studied at Royal Naval College, Greenwich.
- Itō Hirobumi (surname is Itō, 1841–1909), first Prime Minister of Japan, member of the Chōshū Five
- Dairoku Kikuchi (1855–1917), Japanese academic, first Japanese to graduate from Cambridge
- Lady Tama Kurokawa (1869–1962), Japanese socialite and wife of orientalist, Sir Edwin Arnold
- Yoshio Markino (1869–1956), Japanese artist and author based in London
- Natsume Sōseki (surname is Natsume, 1867–1916), Japanese novelist, studied at the University College London
- Heihachiro Togo (1848–1934), Japanese admiral, cadet at the Thames Nautical Training College

== See also ==
- Ethnic groups in London
- Japanese community in the United Kingdom
- Japanese Village, Knightsbridge
- Anglo-Japanese Alliance
