= James Lord Bowes =

James Lord Bowes (21 June 1834 – 27 October 1899) was a wealthy Liverpool (UK) wool broker, art collector and patron of the arts, author and authority on Japan and its art, and benefactor. In 1888 he was appointed the first foreign-born Japanese Consul in Great Britain, a post he held until his sudden death in 1899 at the age of 65. In 1890, in the grounds of Streatlam Tower, his home in the Toxteth area of Liverpool, he opened to the public the first dedicated museum of Japanese art in the western world.

James Lord Bowes was born in Horsforth, Leeds, UK, the youngest of six surviving children of John Bowes (Wool Stapler) and Elizabeth Bowes (née Lord). The family moved to Liverpool sometime between 1840-1845 after the death of John Bowes.

James Lord Bowes circa 1875.

== History ==
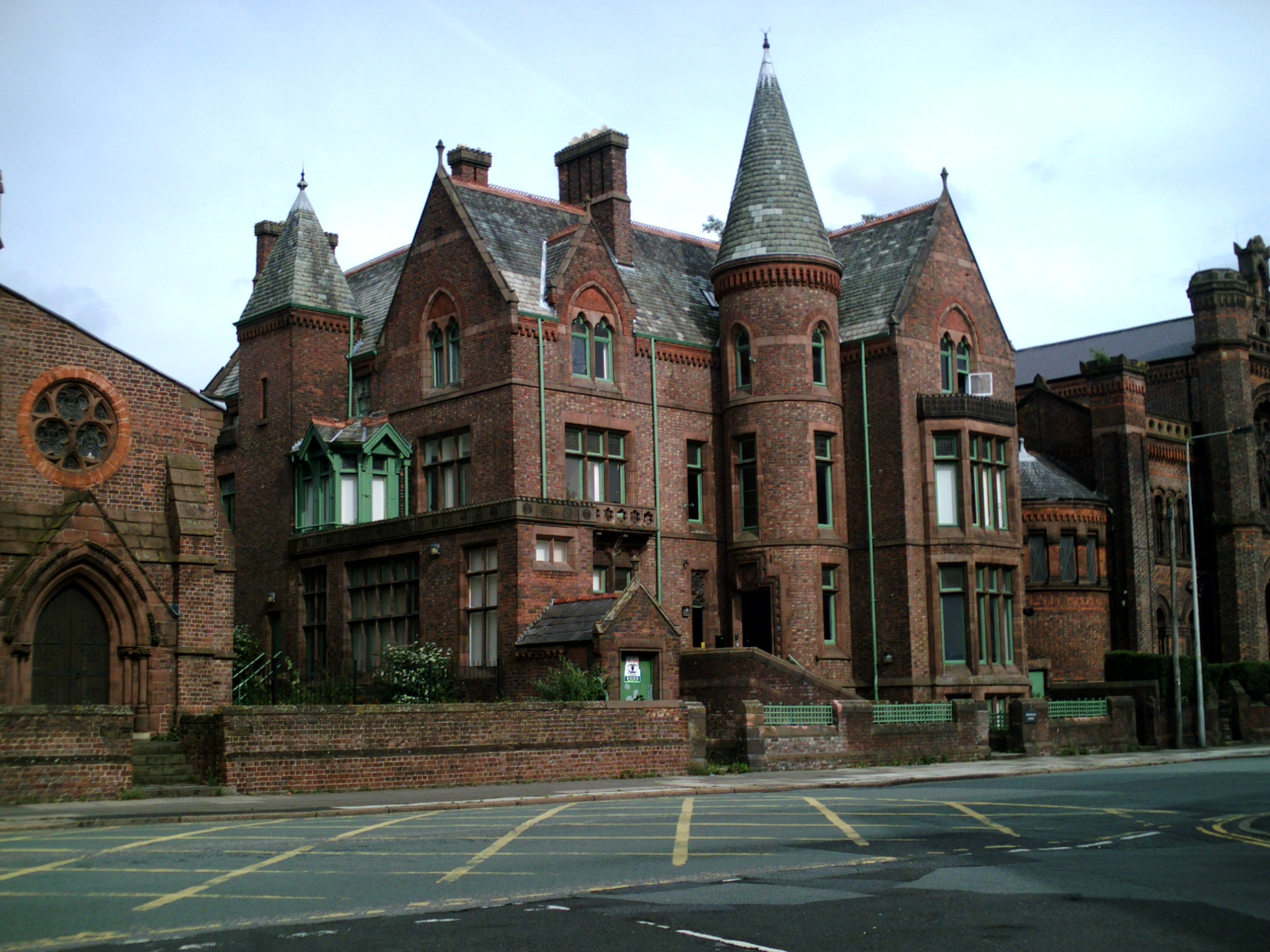
Streatlam Tower, 5 Princes Road

As a young man, Bowes attended the Liverpool Collegiate Institution, a short distance from his home in the Islington area of Liverpool. Upon leaving college, he worked for nearly seven years in a merchant's office gaining useful experience in general merchandising, including the city's well-established cotton trade.

When he was 22, he joined his brother John who had just set up on his own account as a wool broker. The business prospered and in January 1859 he was made a full partner in the firm of John L. Bowes & Brother, Wool Brokers. In that same year, the business moved to the newly erected Queens Insurance Building in 11 Dale Street and the Bowes family moved house to the more up-market Canning Street. James also travelled to America that year in search of new business opportunities, the first of many overseas trips he was to make in the decades that followed.

In 1867 James Lord Bowes moved to Streatlam Cottage, set in its own grounds adjacent to Strawberry Field in Beaconsfield Road, in semi-rural Woolton, some six miles south of Liverpool city centre. In 1871 he married Charlotte Vickery Adam, daughter of Mary Adam (née De Bels) (1809-1898) and William Adam (1804-1867) formerly of Lisbon, Portugal. The Adam family were established importers of oranges and soft fruit based in London and Liverpool, William being the manager of their estates in Portugal. Charlotte's brother John Isabel Adam (1857-1919) was also a wool broker and worked for John L. Bowes and Brother. James and Charlotte had six children, the last-surviving of whom, Ruth, died in 1967, aged 94 years.

James Lord Bowes immersed himself in the commercial and artistic life of Liverpool – he was several times both Vice President of the Liverpool Chamber of Commerce and President of the Liverpool Art Club. In 1872 he commissioned the building of the imposing Streatlam Tower, 5 Princes Road, Liverpool by architect George Ashdown Audsley, with whom he shared a passion for Japanese art, particularly ceramics. From circa 1867 he had collected Japanese art works of all kinds and organised an exhibition of them in the Liverpool Art Club. Arising from this event he co-authored the Descriptive Catalogue of Japanese Lacquer ware of the Bowes Collection. 1875, and The Keramic Art of Japan. London: Sotheran & Co. 1875, 1881, both with Audsley. Sending a copy of The Keramic Art of Japan to the Emperor Meiji in 1891 resulted in a reply from the Minister of the Imperial Household, Tokudaiji Sanetsune / (Sanenori) that the Emperor had sent him, in return, an Imperial gift of two bronze vases.

In 1888 Bowes was appointed the Honorary Japanese Consul at Liverpool, the first such appointment in the UK. In 1890 he erected a private museum in the grounds of Streatlam Tower which he opened to the public. All the proceeds from this were directed to the benefit of his chosen charities within Liverpool. In April 1891 he hosted a Japanese Fancy Fair in the museum, attracting 20,000 people in six days and raising £5,290 (£580,000 in 2012 values, ref: Safalra.com) for Liverpool charities. In May 1891 he was awarded the Japanese Order of the Sacred Treasure, fourth class and in February 1897 he received the third class rank of the same award.

=== Death ===
Bowes died of a heart attack on a train en route from London to Liverpool on 27 October 1899 and is buried in Toxteth Park Cemetery (Smithdown Road) Liverpool. The Bowes Museum of Japanese Art closed following his death. Attempts to find a new home for his extensive collection failed and the contents of the museum were sold at an 11-day public auction in Liverpool in May 1901. Charlotte died in 1923 in Liverpool at the age of 79.

== Published works ==
- Descriptive Catalogue of Japanese Lacquer ware of the Bowes Collection. 1875.
- The Keramic Arts of Japan. London: Sotheran & Co. 1875, 1881.
- Japanese Marks and Seals, with maps/illus. 1882.
- Japanese Enamels. London 1886.
- Japanese Pottery. London 1890.
- A Vindication of the Decorated Pottery of Japan. Liverpool 1891.
- The Gardens of Uyeno and Asakusu, Yedo. Liverpool 1894.
- Notes on Shippo. London 1895.
