= Britons in Japan =

Total population
- 22,428 (December 2025)

Regions with significant populations
- Tokyo · Kanagawa · Osaka · Hokkaido

Languages
- Japanese · English · Welsh · Scottish Gaelic · Scots · Hong Kong Cantonese

Religion
- Primarily none or Christianity (minority Buddhism or Shinto)

Related ethnic groups
- British diaspora

British people make up the 19th largest foreign resident community in Japan, with a population of 22,428 as of December 2025. The United Kingdom is the third largest source of non-Asian foreign residents in Japan, following Brazil and the United States, and the largest source of European foreign residents.

== Overview ==
According to data released by the Ministry of Justice's Immigration Bureau, there were 22,428 British citizens living in Japan as of December 2025. This does not include short-term residents, people naturalised as Japanese citizens, or those staying as government officials or diplomats. The prefectures with the highest concentration of British nationals were Tokyo (7,689), Kanagawa (2,012), Hokkaido (1,748) and Osaka (1,405). Permanent residents comprised 7,265 of the population, followed by those on working visas (3,615) and those staying as spouses of Japanese nationals (3,207).

People from Hong Kong, which was once a British colony, were allowed to retain their British passports following the UK's handover of Hong Kong to China in 1997; this allows them to enter and stay in Japan as British citizens, and they are categorised as such by Japan's Immigration Bureau.

The British Chamber of Commerce in Japan is an independent non-profit organisation that promotes trade and business ties between the UK and Japan. The British School in Tokyo provides an English language based educational curriculum for students of over 50 different nationalities. The school serves a number of children of British heritage living in the city.

== Notable people ==
- William Adams (known in Japan as Miura Anjin; 1564–1620), English navigator who became the first European samurai
- John William Fenton (1828 – 1890), British musician who wrote the melody of the Japanese national anthem
- Peter Barakan (born 1951), English broadcaster
- Thomas Baty (1869–1954), English legal advisor to the Japanese Foreign Office and one of the first openly transgender people in Japan
- Chris Broad (born 1990), English YouTuber
- Sky Brown (born 2008), British-Japanese professional skateboarder
- Connor Colquhoun (born 1996), Welsh voice actor
- Josiah Conder (1852–1920), British-French architect who designed many government buildings and brought Western architecture to Japan
- George Gauntlett (1868–1956), Welsh teacher of English who developed of one of the earliest Japanese shorthand methods
- Pico Iyer (born 1957), English writer
- Sonoya Mizuno (born 1986), British-Japanese actress
- Iso Mutsu (born Gertrude Passingham; 1867–1930), English writer who married a Japanese nobleman and documented her life in Kamakura
- C. W. Nicol (1940–2020), Welsh writer and environmentalist
- Sarah Midori Perry (born 1991), British-Japanese musician
- Rina Sawayama (born 1990), singer, actress and model
- Venetia Stanley-Smith (1950–2023), British herbalist who documented her life in rural Kyoto
- Rita Taketsuru (born Jessie Cowan; 1896–1961), Scottish businesswoman who co-founded Nikka Whisky with her Japanese husband Masataka

== See also ==
- Japan–United Kingdom relations
- Japanese in the United Kingdom
- British Embassy, Tokyo
