= Embassy of the United Kingdom, Tokyo =

British Embassy, Tokyo 駐日英国大使館
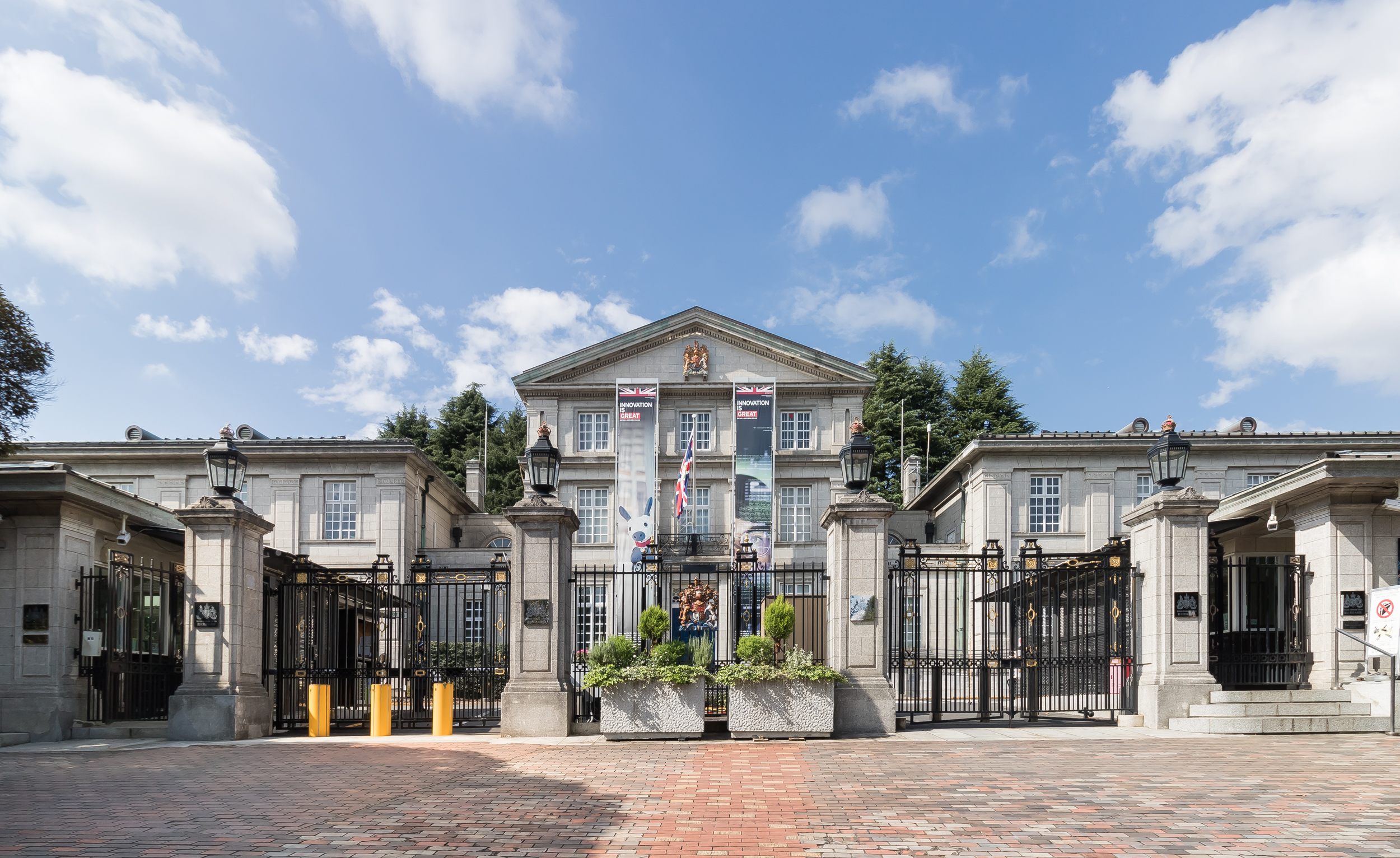
- Location: Tokyo, Japan
- Address: No 1 Ichiban-cho, Chiyoda-ku, Tokyo
- Coordinates: 35°41′11″N 139°44′40″E
- Ambassador: Julia Longbottom
- Website: Office Website

The British Embassy, Tokyo (駐日英国大使館 Chūnichi Eikoku Taishikan) is the chief diplomatic mission of the United Kingdom in Japan, with the Ambassador of the United Kingdom to Japan being the chief of mission. The embassy compound measures about 35,000 m^{2}, located at No 1 Ichibanchō, Chiyoda-ku, Tokyo (Japanese: 東京都千代田区一番町一), to the west of the Imperial Palace, and separated from the latter by a moat.

== Role ==
The British embassy performs a sustaining role in Japan–United Kingdom relations, dealing with political, economic and cultural interaction between the two nations, and also offers visa services to Japanese and other nationals in Japan. It provides consular services for about 19,000 British citizens in Japan. The UK also has a Consulate-General in Osaka.

== History ==
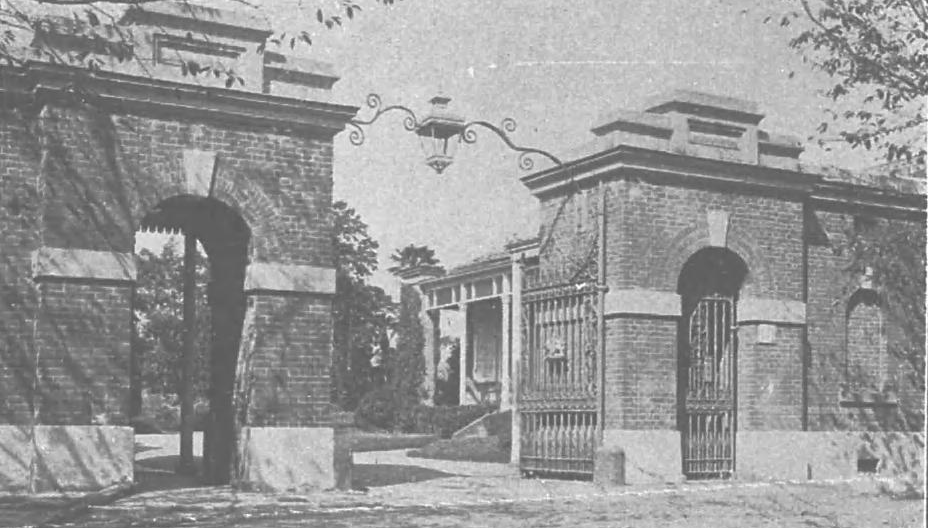
Brick-built entrance gate of the British Embassy in Tokyo, 1912

After the signing of the Anglo-Japanese Treaty of Amity and Commerce in 1858, diplomatic relations were formally established between the United Kingdom and the Tokugawa shogunate. Sir Rutherford Alcock was appointed Consul-General in Japan and took up residence at the British Legation in Kobe. In 1859, the first legation in Edo (now Tokyo) was opened at the Tōzen-ji temple in Takanawa. Alcock moved to Edo and was promoted to Minister Plenipotentiary.

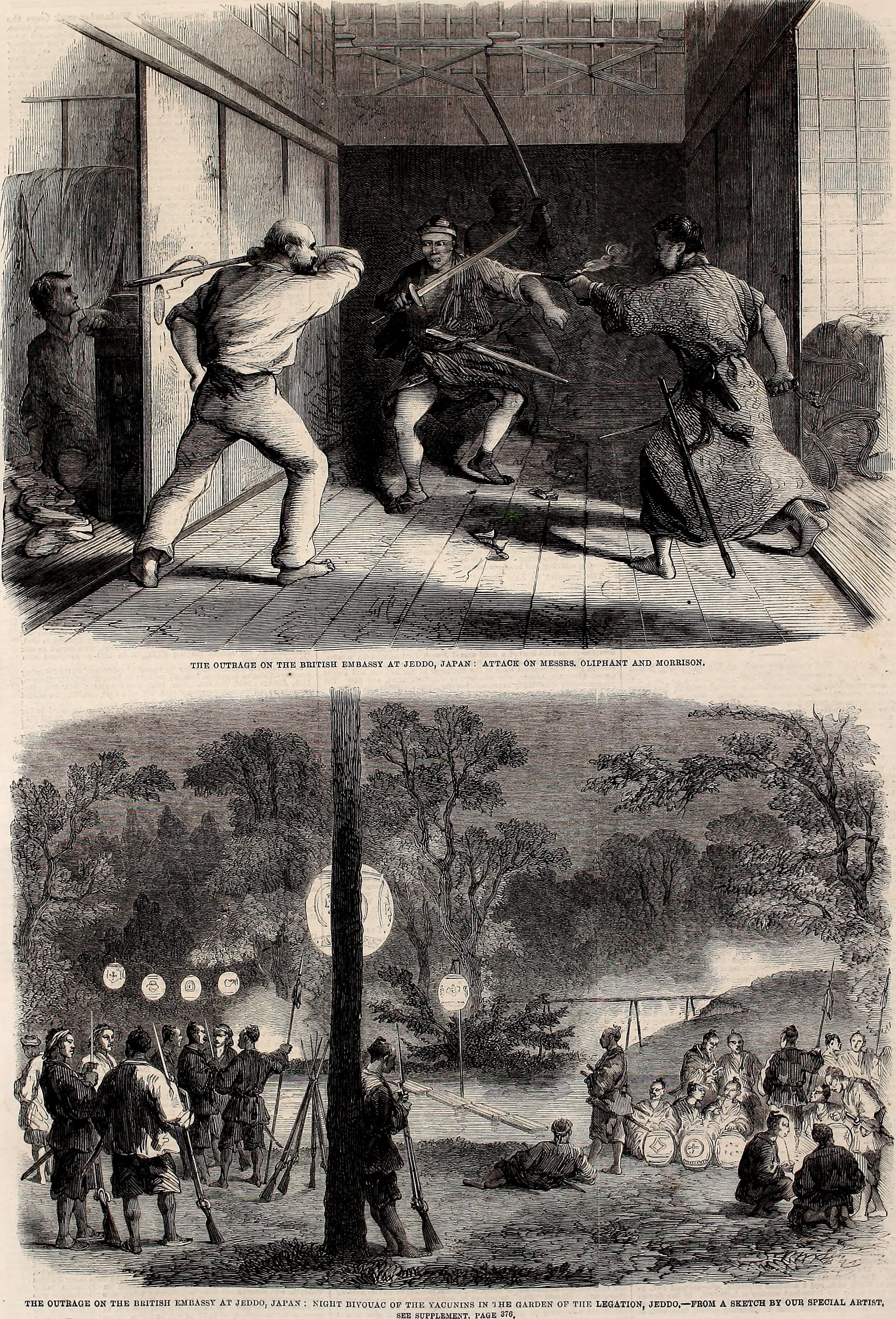
The outrage on the British Embassy at Japan, in 1861

By 1861, security had become a significant concern at Tōzen-ji. An attack was launched on the British Legation by members of the Sonnō jōi movement (revere the emperor, expel the barbarians), and Alcock was severely injured. The attacks in 1861 and 1862 demonstrated the lack of suitability of Tōzen-ji from a security perspective, both due to its architecture and location. The legation was moved to Yokohama. On 31 January 1863, Takasugi Shinsaku led a squad and set fire to the construction site for a new legation building in Gotenyama, Shinagawa and the site became unusable. The legation remained in Yokohama.

After the fall of the Tokugawa shogunate in 1868 and the establishment of the new Government of Japan, Tokyo became safer for foreign residents. In view of the inconvenience caused by the distance between Yokohama and the capital, the new Minister Plenipotentiary, Sir Harry Smith Parkes, made use of Sengaku-ji temple in Edo as a temporary office. He decided to move the legation to Tokyo permanently in 1871. To find land for the permanent use of the legation, Parkes surveyed several properties abandoned by daimyō as a result of the abolition of the domain system, and he obtained the land required in the fifth month of 1872. The land he chose for the new legation was at Ichiban-cho, directly across from the Hanzōmon Gate of the Imperial Palace, a site of considerable gravity that remains home to the British Embassy today. In May 1872, Parkes agreed with the Government of Japan to acquire the land with a perpetual fixed-rent leasehold.

Robert Boyce, architect for the Office of Works in Shanghai was brought in to plan the layout of the compound. It would include the minister's residence, chancery offices and single-storey houses for British staff amongst other ancillary buildings. At Parkes's request, the design also included a tower to look out at Mount Fuji. Construction was finished in December 1874 and the site ready to be occupied in 1875. The residence was a red-brick building designed by Thomas Waters, also famous for rebuilding Ginza as a Western-style "Bricktown".

After the Japanese victories over China and Russia, which earned the Empire of Japan status as a great power, the British Legation in Tokyo was upgraded to an embassy in 1905. After the 1923 Great Kantō earthquake caused extensive damage to the chancery, plans for a second building were carried out by the Ministry of Works, and a new chancery, the present building, came in use in 1929.

The interruption of diplomatic relations between the British Empire and Imperial Japan occurred at the outbreak of the Pacific War in 1941, and the British Embassy in Tokyo was closed down. Following the Occupation of Japan in 1945, the embassy compound became a shore establishment of the Royal Navy, named HMS Return. Between 1946 and 1952, prior to the Treaty of San Francisco, the British Liaison Mission in Tokyo performed the role of a diplomatic mission in Japan. The treaty came into force on April 28, 1952, and the British embassy was re-opened.

== Access ==
The embassy is served by the Hanzōmon Station on Hanzōmon Line, Tokyo Metro.

== See also ==
- Japan–United Kingdom relations
- The British School in Tokyo
- List of Ambassadors of the United Kingdom to Japan
- List of diplomatic missions of the United Kingdom
- List of diplomatic missions in Japan
- Embassy of Japan, London
- Britons in Japan
