= Christianity in Japan =

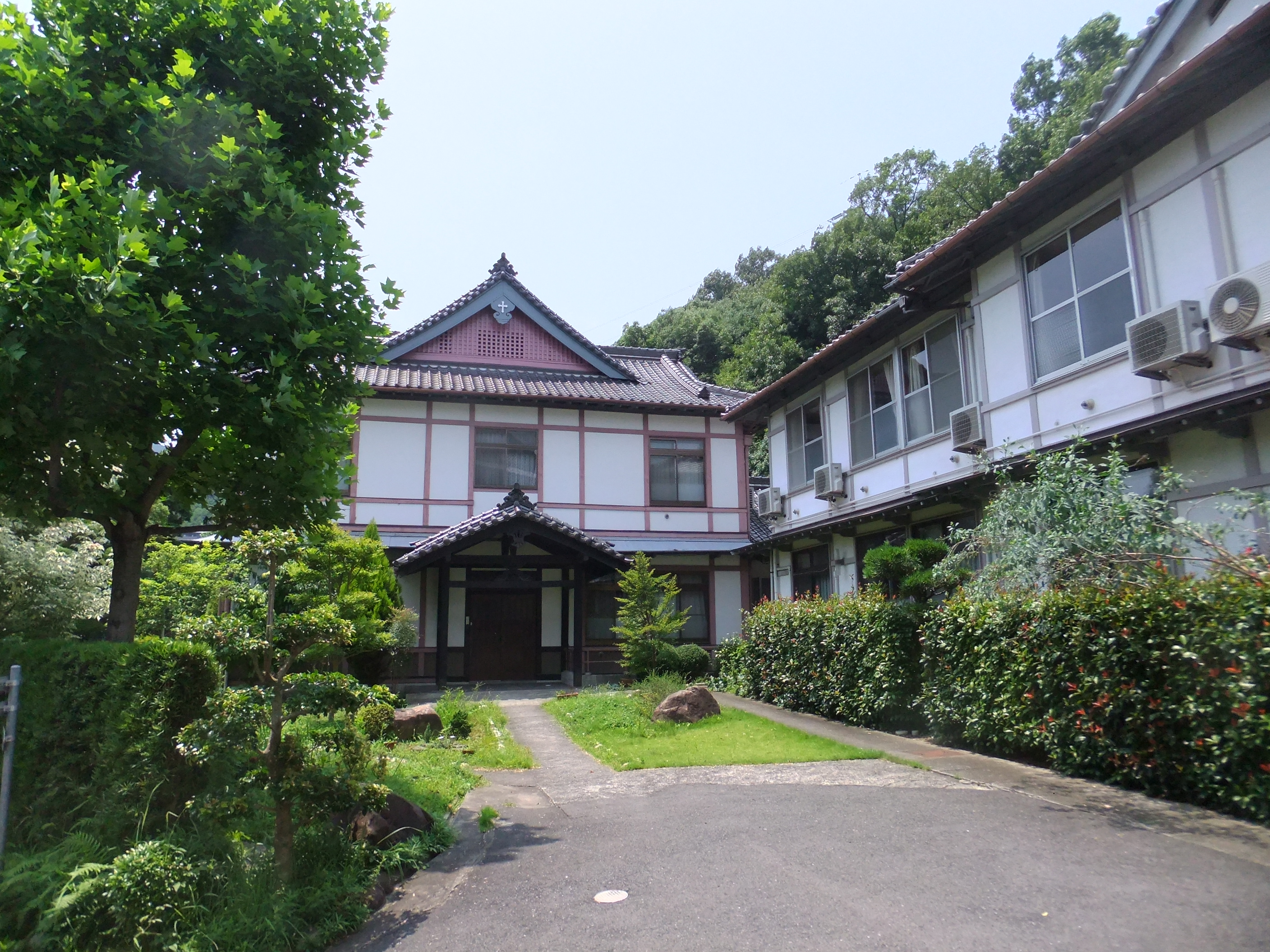
Nagatsuka Monastery for Jesuits in Hiroshima features traditional temple architecture

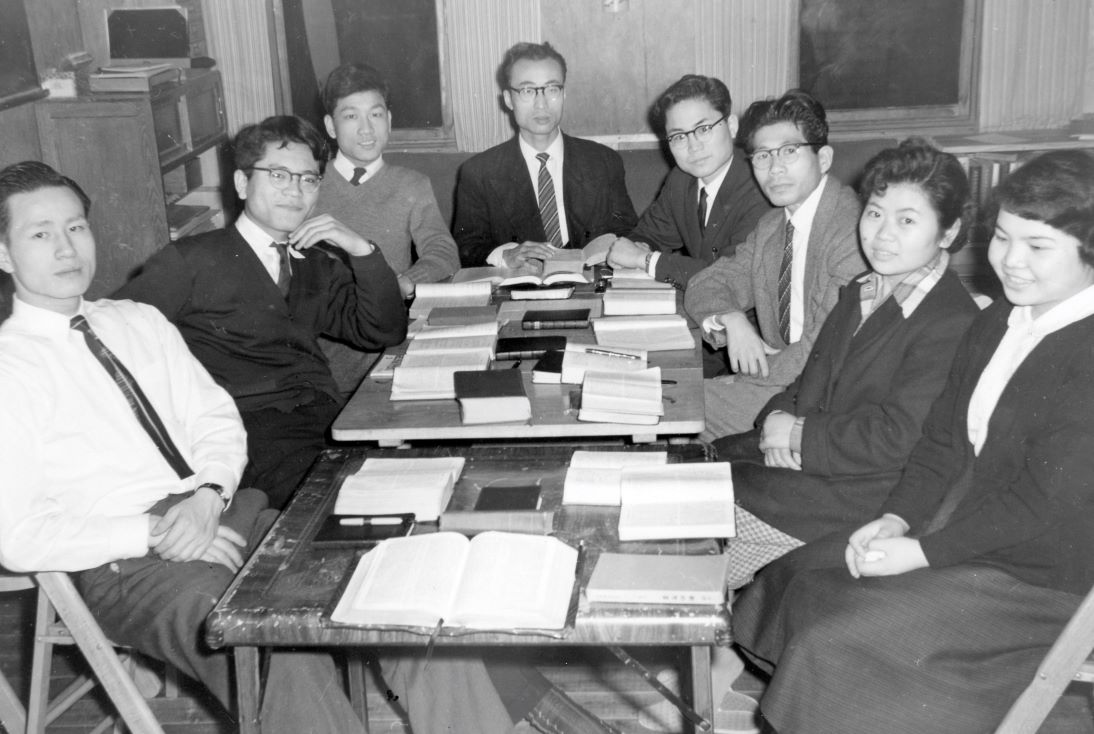
A Japanese bible study group

Christianity in Japan is among the nation's largest minority religions in terms of individuals who state an explicit affiliation or faith. In 2024, there were 1.87 million Christians according to one study. In Japan, the number went down from 1.9 million Christians in 2019. In the early years of the 21st century, between less than 1% and 1.5% of the population claimed Christian belief or affiliation. As of December 31, 2023, according to the Department of Religious Affairs of the Ministry of Culture of Japan, the total Christian denominations in Japan numbered 2,383 parishes (communities), 4,367 clergy, and 300,921 followers (0.73% of the total population of Japan).

Although formally banned in 1612 and today critically portrayed as a foreign "religion of colonialism", Christianity has played a role in shaping the relationship between religion and the Japanese state for more than four centuries. Most large Christian denominations, including Catholicism, Protestantism, Oriental Orthodoxy, and Orthodox Christianity, are represented in Japan today. Christian culture has a generally positive image in Japan. The majority of Japanese people are, traditionally, of the Shinto or Buddhist faith. The majority of Japanese couples, about 60–70%, are wed in "nonreligious" Christian ceremonies. This makes Christian weddings the most influential aspect of Christianity in contemporary Japan.

== Etymology ==
The Japanese word for Christianity (キリスト教, Kirisuto-kyō) is a compound of kirisuto (キリスト, Christ), the Japanese adaptation of the Portuguese word for Christ, Cristo, and the Sino-Japanese word for doctrine (敎, kyō; a teaching or precept, from Middle Chinese kæ̀w 敎), as in bukkyō (仏教, Buddhism).

== History ==
=== Missionaries and early expansion ===
The first appearance of Christianity in Japan was the arrival of the Portuguese Catholics in 1549. Navarrese missionary Francis Xavier arrived in Japan with three Japanese Catholic converts intending to start a church in Japan. The local Japanese people initially assumed that the foreigners were from India and that Christianity was a new Indian faith. These mistaken impressions were due to already existing ties between the Portuguese and India. The Indian state of Goa was a central base for Portuguese India at the time, and a significant portion of the crew on board their ships were Indian Christians.

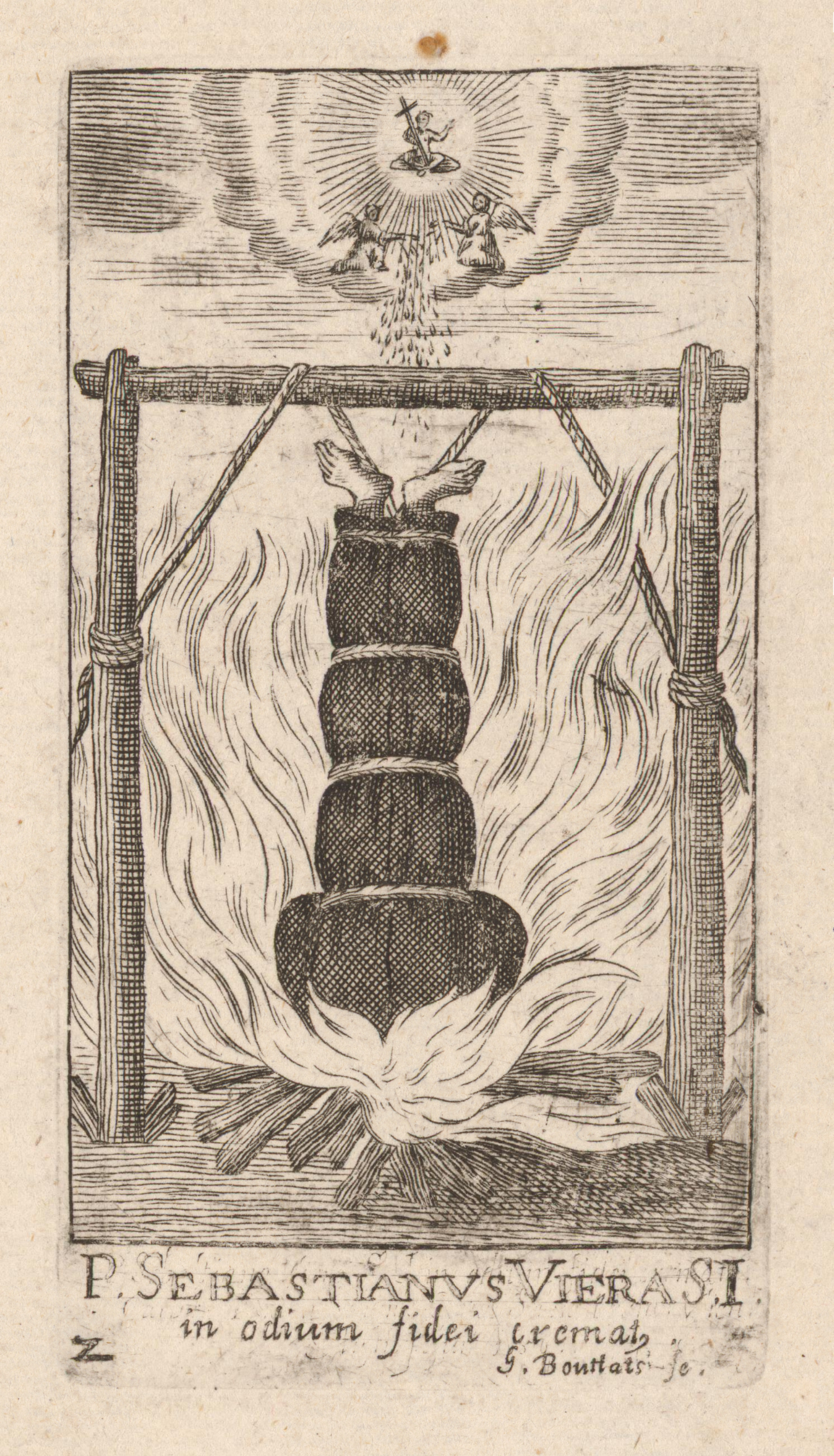
The martyrdom of a Jesuit father in Japan in 1634, engraved by Gerard Bouttats

Later on, the Catholic missionary activities were exclusively performed by Jesuits and mendicant orders, such as the Franciscans and Dominicans. Francis Xavier (who would later be canonized a Catholic saint for his missionary work), Cosme de Torres (a Jesuit priest), and Juan Fernández were the first who arrived in Kagoshima hoping to bring Christianity to Japan. Xavier and the Jesuit order were held in good esteem, and his efforts seem to have been rewarded with a thriving community of converts. At baptism, these converts were given Portuguese Christian names and forced to adopt Western cultural habits. This practice contributed to suspicions that the converts were in reality foreign agents working to subvert the local social order. (Note: In the source, this claim is made of all of Xavier's converts across Asia in general, including but not limited to those in Japan)

The earliest success Christianity witnessed in Japan occurred in Kyushu. Conversions of local warlords like Ōmura Sumitada, Arima Yoshisada, and Ōtomo Sōrin led to the conversion of many of their subjects. The conversion of several elites in the area was likely due to the decentralized nature of the Sengoku period (1467-1615) where warlords vied for control among themselves. This power vacuum led some warlords to believe that being more open to external sources of power and legitimacy as a possible method to gain an advantage. As several daimyos and their subjects converted to Christianity, the destruction of Shinto shrines and Buddhist temples would often accompany it, with the Jesuits also contributing to the destruction and persecutions. Buddhist monks and Shinto priests would face persecution by being forcefully evicted out of their religious sites, be forced to marry, or forced to convert.

=== Perceived threat to Japan ===
Under Oda Nobunaga, the Jesuits enjoyed the favor of his regency. The successor of Oda, Toyotomi Hideyoshi at first protected Christianity, but later changed his policy with the publishing of the Bateren Edict, banning missionary activities. After conquering Kyushu, Hideyoshi visited Hakozaki and came to believe that Jesuits were selling Japanese people as slaves overseas, Christians were destroying shrines and temples, and people were being forced to convert to Christianity, resulting in the aforementioned edict. Alessandro Valignano, on 14 December 1582 wrote a letter to Governor-General of the Philippines Francisco de Sande Picón stating that it would be impossible to conquer Japan by military power and converting Japan to Christianity was the most important task of church. Scholars also theorise that Hideyoshi believed the true mission of the Christian missionaries was to convert the Japanese population to Christianity, overthrow the government, and turn it into a colony.

=== Persecution under the Shogunate ===
Under Hideyoshi and the succeeding Tokugawa shogunate, Catholic Christianity was repressed and adherents were persecuted. During Toyotomi rule especially, foreign missionaries were killed in Japan, some by (Japanese-style) crucifixion; most famously, the twenty-six martyrs of Japan were tortured and crucified on crosses outside Nagasaki to discourage Christianity in 1597. (Hideyoshi nonetheless showed favor to daimyō who had converted, such as Konishi Yukinaga.) Following a brief respite as Tokugawa Ieyasu rose to power and pursued trade with the Portuguese powers, there were further persecutions and martyrdoms in 1613, 1622 (Great Genna Martyrdom), 1623 (Great Martyrdom of Edo) 1630, 1632 and 1634.

The Tokugawa shoguns eradicated Christianity in Japan via murder, persecution and decrees. In 1637, Matsukura Katsuie imposed a high tax onto people and oppressed Christians. This, combined with famine, led in 1638 to the Christian-led Shimabara Rebellion, where an estimated 37,000 people (mostly Christians), were massacred. The rebellion started as a peasant movement, but later Christians joined the cause. This was the largest rebellion in the history of Japan. In 50 years, the crackdown policies of the shoguns reduced the number of Christians to near zero.

By this point, after the Shimabara Rebellion, the remaining Christians had been forced to publicly renounce their faith. Many continued practicing Christianity in secret, in modern times becoming known as the "hidden Christians" (隠れキリシタン, kakure kirishitan). These secret believers would often conceal Christian iconography in closed shrines, lanterns or inconspicuous buildings. For example, Himeji Castle has a Christian cross on one of its 17th-century roof tiles, in place of a mon, indicating that one of its occupants was a secret Christian.

Drawn from the oral histories of Japanese Catholic communities, Shūsaku Endō's historical novel Silence provides detailed fictionalised accounts of the persecution of Christian communities and the suppression of the Church.

=== Opening of Japan ===
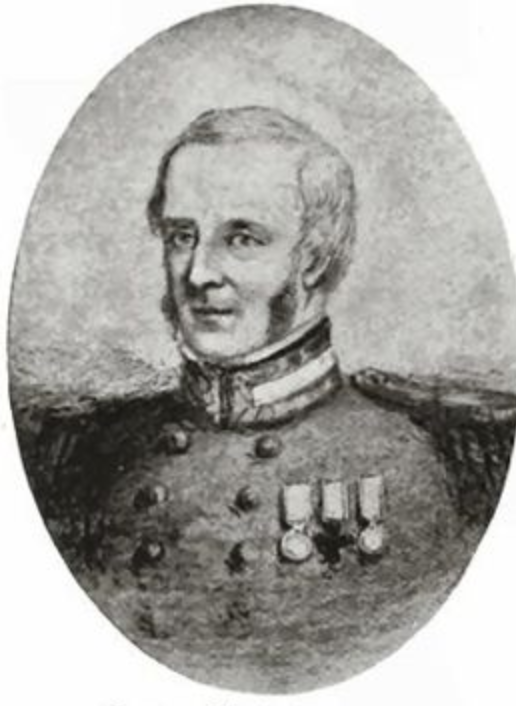
Capt. Herbert Clifford

Captain Herbert Clifford was an officer in the Royal Navy during the Napoleonic Wars and the founder of the Loochoo Naval Mission (1843). Clifford worked with missionary the Rev. Bernard Jean Bettelheim, who was the first Protestant Christian missionary to Okinawa.

After Japan was opened to greater foreign interaction in 1853, many Christian clergymen were sent from Catholic, Protestant, and Orthodox churches, though proselytism was still banned. After the Meiji Restoration, freedom of religion was introduced in 1871, giving all Christian communities the right to legal existence and preaching.

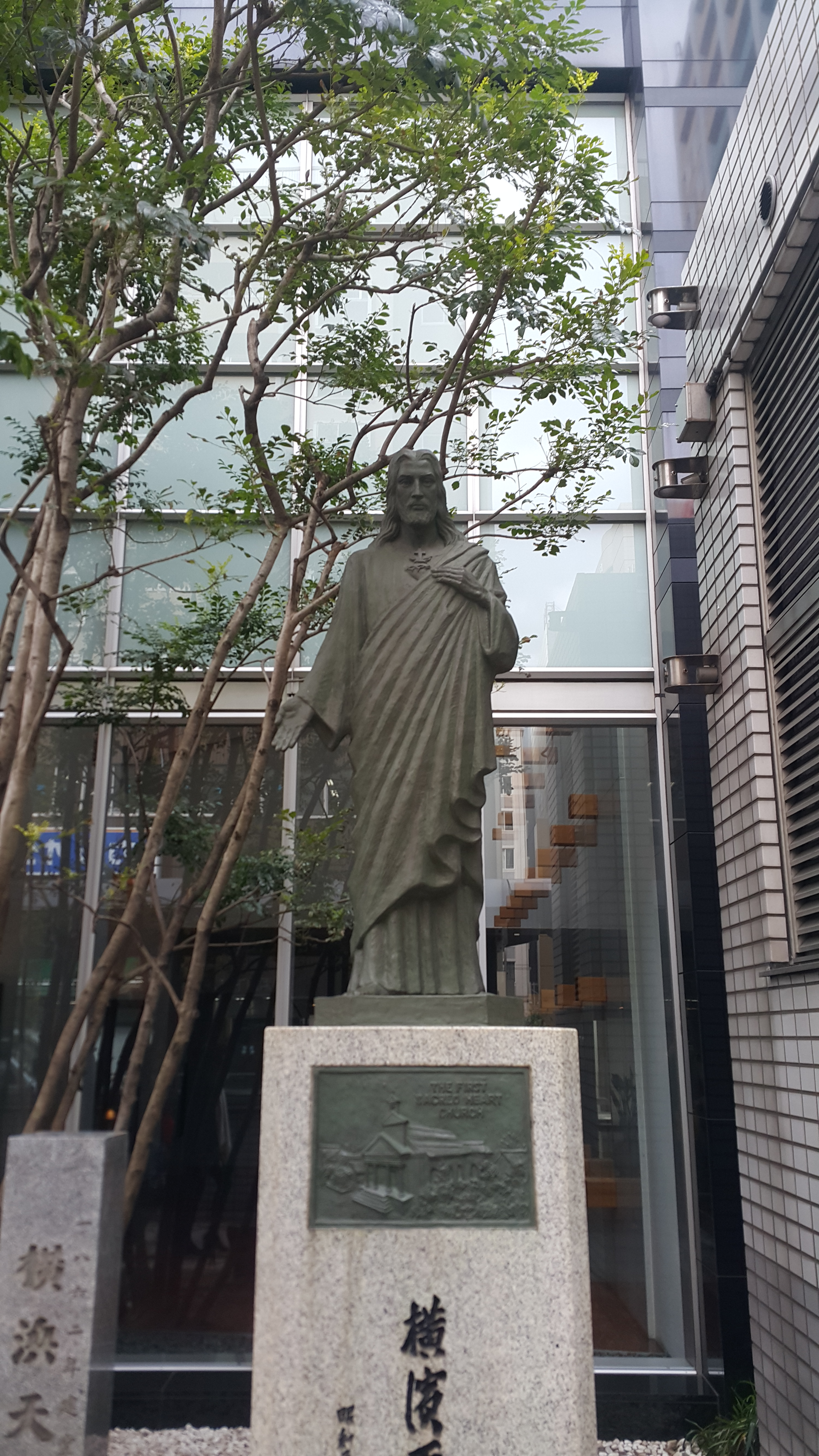
A statue of Jesus in Yokohama

Quakers have had a significant impact in Japan. The American Quaker Elizabeth Janet Gray Vining was hired by Emperor Hirohito in 1946 to be a private tutor to his son, Crown Prince Akihito. She taught English and introduced all of the children of the Imperial Household to western culture and values. "Vining was chosen because she was not only a Quaker known to be a pacifist but also an author of children’s literature, whom the Japanese expected to be sympathetic to the 12-year-old crown prince in the midst of the postwar confusion. Some also write that the imperial side found Vining more ideal than the other candidate [a Presbyterian], as she, having lost her beloved husband in an accident, had experienced the utmost sorrow in life and therefore would have compassion for others."

Quaker influence is thought by many to be the foundation of the Pacifism promoted by members the Royal Family. This pacifism has stood in stark contrast to right-wing nationalists.

== Culture ==
Japan remains one of the most secular nations in the world according to the World Values Survey.

Christianity in Japan is spread among many denominational affiliations. In the early 2000s, 70 percent of Japanese churches had an average attendance of less than 50, though membership was often almost double this figure.

=== Holidays ===
The celebration of selected Christian holidays has gained popularity in Japan since the Second World War – primarily as commercial events, but with also an emphasis on sharing time with loved ones, either significant others or close family.

Except in Japan's minority Christian communities, Easter is not typically marked by any special form of celebration.

Christmas in Japan is celebrated on a much larger scale as a commercial and secular festival, but again is not an official public holiday. Christmas lights, Santa Claus, parties, gift exchanges, and eating Western-inspired Christmas foods, especially Kentucky Fried Chicken and strawberry shortcake, are all familiar features of this event. Many Christians have criticized this as a commercialization of the holiday, being contrary to the teachings of Jesus Christ. In Japan, rather than being a family or religious occasion, Christmas is seen as a time to spend with friends or a significant other. Christmas Eve is celebrated as a couple's holiday on which romantic gifts are exchanged.

St. Valentine's Day in Japan is also celebrated, but the normal Western cultural traditions are often reversed – women give men a gift of chocolate, and on White Day, one month later, the favor is returned. Gifts are not exclusive to romantic relationships; women exchange gifts most frequently between one another and will occasionally give male co-workers chocolate, although this latter exchange is often referred to as an obligation gift. It is not as common for couples to go out on dates together; that element seems to be reflected in Christmas Eve instead.

=== Expression ===
Christian weddings have become prominent as an alternative (or addition) to traditional Shinto ceremonies. This is partially due to the successful missionary efforts of Japanese Christian churches and commercial endeavors. Architecturally resembling churches, wedding chapels have sprung up across Japan to meet the needs of Japanese who do not join Christian churches but still desire the ceremony.

== Demographics ==
=== Population by prefecture ===
The percentages of Christians populations of each prefecture from 2025.

Table
Prefectures	Total Population	Christian Population	Christian percentage of total population
Aichi	7,450,000	46,164	0.62
Akita	896,000	3,605	0.4
Aomori	1,175,000	4,817	0.41
Chiba	6,282,000	36,197	0.58
Ehime	1,281,000	6,919	0.54
Fukui	763,000	1,951	0.26
Fukuoka	5,082,000	44,232	0.87
Fukushima	1,750,000	6,850	0.39
Gifu	1,936,000	7,722	0.4
Gunma	1,900,000	9,500	0.5
Hiroshima	2,720,000	19,848	0.73
Hokkaidō	5,022,000	40,206	0.80
Hyōgo	5,325,000	55,910	1.05
Ibaraki	2,799,000	10,076	0.36
Ishikawa	1,109,000	5,431	0.49
Iwate	1,131,000	3,846	0.34
Kagawa	919,000	4,101	0.45
Kagoshima	1,524,000	12,352	0.81
Kanagawa	9,224,000	298,669	3.24
Kōchi	658,000	3,091	0.47
Kumamoto	1,701,000	16,301	0.96
Kyōto	2,519,000	21,693	0.86
Mie	1,729,000	7,264	0.42
Miyagi	2,227,000	13,407	0.6
Miyazaki	1,021,000	5,956	0.58
Nagano	1,993,000	10,967	0.55
Nagasaki	1,252,000	59,118	4.72
Nara	1,282,000	8,205	0.64
Nīgata	2,094,000	8,304	0.4
Ōita	1,087,000	5,422	0.5
Okayama	1,823,000	11,488	0.63
Okinawa	1,472,000	25,722	1.75
Ōsaka	8,720,000	72,365	0.83
Saga	801,000	3,828	0.48
Saitama	7,342,000	36,032	0.49
Shiga	1,407,000	6,199	0.44
Shimane	647,000	2,465	0.3
Shizuoka	3,537,000	18,946	0.54
Tochigi	1,927,000	7,063	0.37
Tokushima	692,000	2,810	0.41
Tokyo	14,170,000	878,497	6.2
Tottori	550,000	2,906	0.55
Toyama	996,000	2,446	0.25
Wakayama	891,000	4,969	0.56
Yamagata	1,004,000	5,561	0.55
Yamaguchi	1,286,000	8,618	0.67
Yamanashi	793,000	4,281	0.54
Japan	123,781,000	1,872,320	1,51

== Major denominations ==
=== Catholicism ===
Basilica of the Twenty-Six Holy Martyrs of Japan, Nagasaki

Catholicism in Japan operates in communion with the worldwide Catholic Church under the authority of the Pope in Rome. In 2021 there were approximately 431,000 Catholics in Japan (0.34% of the total population), 6,200 of whom are clerics, religious and seminarians. Japan has 15 dioceses, including three metropolitan archdioceses, with 34 bishops, 1,235 priests, and 40 deacons spread out across 957 churches (parishes, quasi-parishes, mission stations, and assembly centres). The patron saints of Japan are Francis Xavier and Peter Baptist.

When Francis Xavier arrived in Japan in 1549 as the first Catholic missionary to the archipelago, Catholicism was Japan's first contact with organized Christianity. The Catholic Church remained the only major source of Christianization in Japan until the fall of the shogunate in 1867 and the Meiji restoration of 1868. The Society of Jesus started the initial missions, joined later on by the less cautious Franciscan order. Twenty Catholic missionaries operated in Japan by 1570. Nagasaki became the center of Japanese Catholicism, and maintained close cultural and religious ties to its Portuguese origins. These ties were severed once Christianity was outlawed in the early-17th century; at this point, Catholicism went underground, its rites preserved by the Kakure Kirishitan, or "hidden Christians", who continued practicing their faith in secret private devotion.

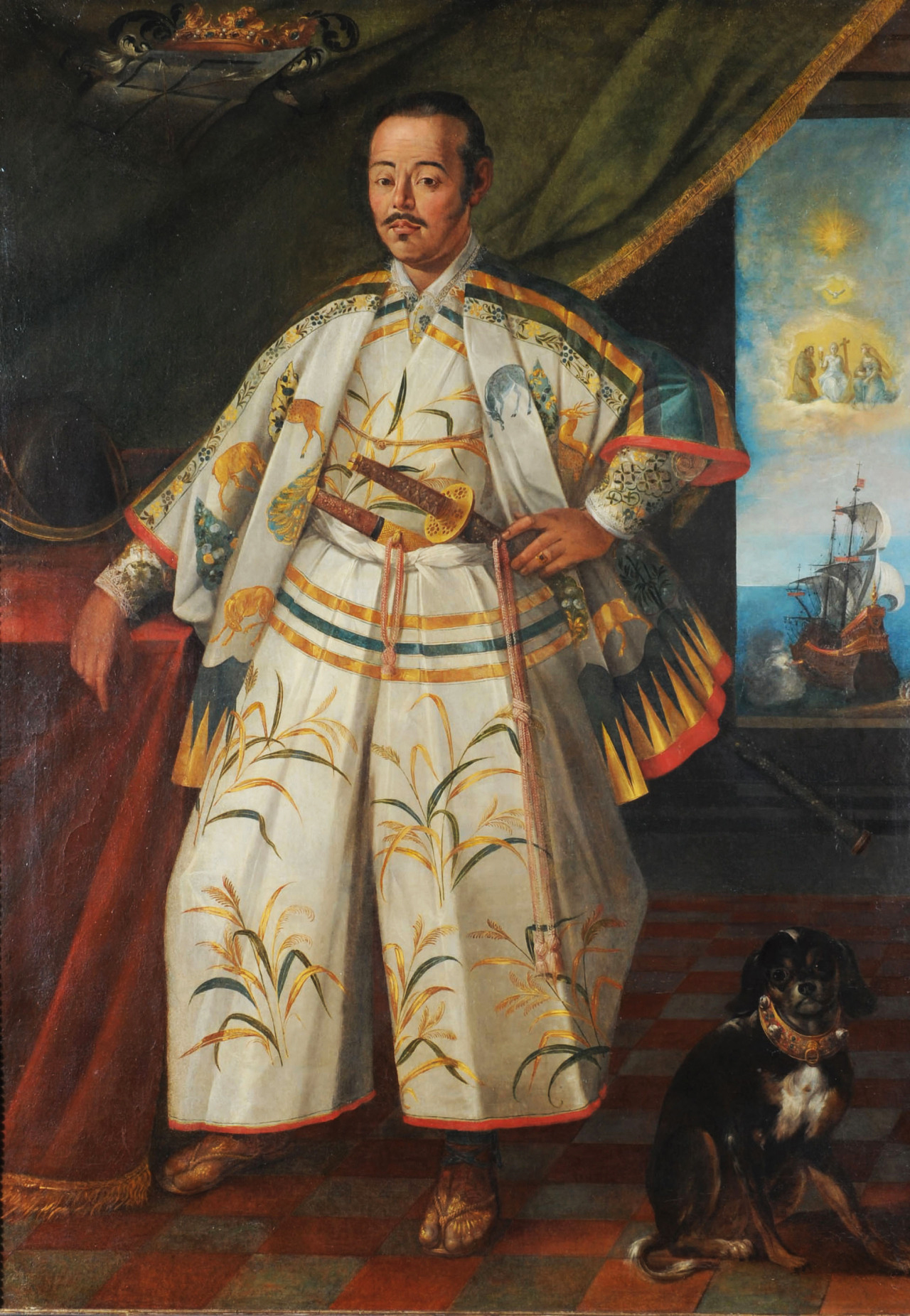
Hasekura Tsunenaga, the samurai who led a Japanese expedition to see the Pope and was converted to Catholicism

The samurai Hasekura Tsunenaga led a diplomatic mission, accompanied by over one hundred Japanese Christians and twenty-two samurai, to see Pope Paul V. Hasekura arrived in Acapulco, Mexico (then New Spain) in 1614; and would then travel to Spain. After meeting with King Philip III, Hasekura was baptized as a Catholic under the name Felipe Francisco de Fachicura. After traveling to France and Rome, Hasekura returned to Japan in 1620 and was forced to renounce his adopted religion after Christianity was banned.

A multitude of Japanese Catholics were brutally tortured and killed for their faith, thus becoming martyrs. Many of these martyrs have been canonized, and their liturgical memorial is celebrated each year on February 6 in honor of their fidelity to "Christ and his Church" unto death.

In 1981 Pope John Paul II paid a visit to Japan, during which he met with Japanese people, the clergy, and Catholic lay-people, held Holy Mass in the Korakuen Stadium (Tokyo), and visited the Peace Memorial Park in Hiroshima, the Hill of Martyrs in Nagasaki, town of the Immaculate founded by St. Maximilian Kolbe in Nagasaki, and other places. Pope Francis also visited Japan in 2019.

=== Eastern Orthodoxy ===
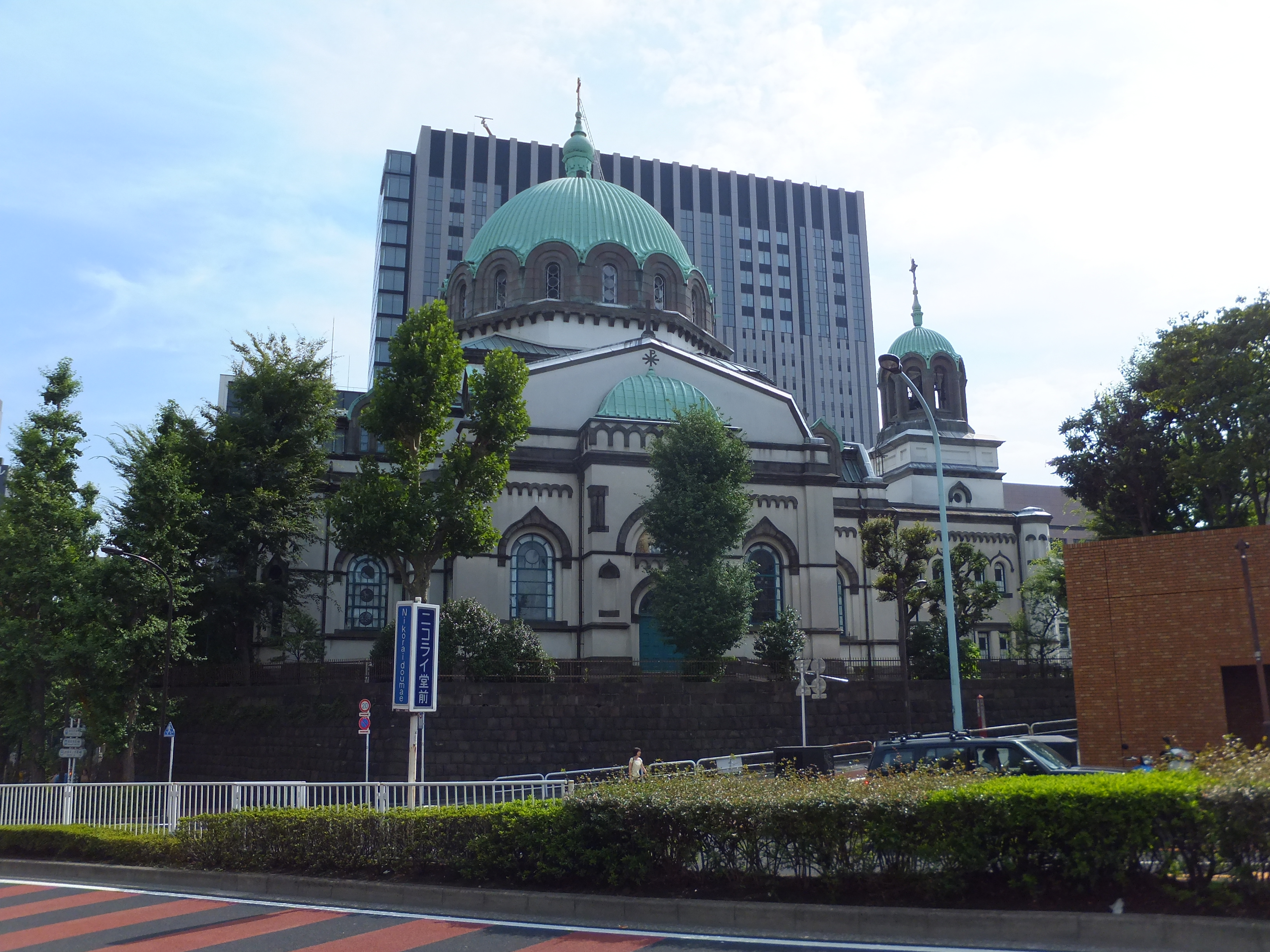
The Holy Resurrection Cathedral in Chiyoda, Tokyo

Eastern Orthodoxy is a minor religion in Japan. The current primate of Japan is vacant. The primate's seat is the Holy Resurrection Cathedral in Chiyoda, Tokyo. Founded in 1891, the cathedral has been known as Nikolai-do in honor of its founder Nicholas Kasatkin. The cathedral serves as the seat of the national primate of Japan and continues to be the main center of Orthodox Christian worship in Japan.

Eastern Orthodoxy was brought to Japan in the 19th century by St. Nicholas (baptized as Ivan Dmitrievich Kasatkin), who was sent in 1861 by the Russian Orthodox Church to Hakodate, Hokkaidō as priest to a chapel of the Russian Consulate. St. Nicholas of Japan made his own translation of the New Testament and some other religious books (Lenten Triodion, Pentecostarion, Feast Services, Book of Psalms, Irmologion) into Japanese. The Patriarchate of Moscow glorified (that is, canonized as a saint) Nicholas in 1970; he is now recognized as St. Nicholas, Equal-to-the-Apostles. His commemoration day is February 16. Andronic Nikolsky, appointed the first Bishop of Kyoto and later martyred as the archbishop of Perm during the Russian Revolution, was also canonized by the Russian Orthodox Church as a Saint and Martyr in the year 2000.

The Ecumenical Patriarchate is also present with the Greek Orthodox Exarchate of Japan under the Orthodox Metropolis of Korea.

=== Protestantism ===
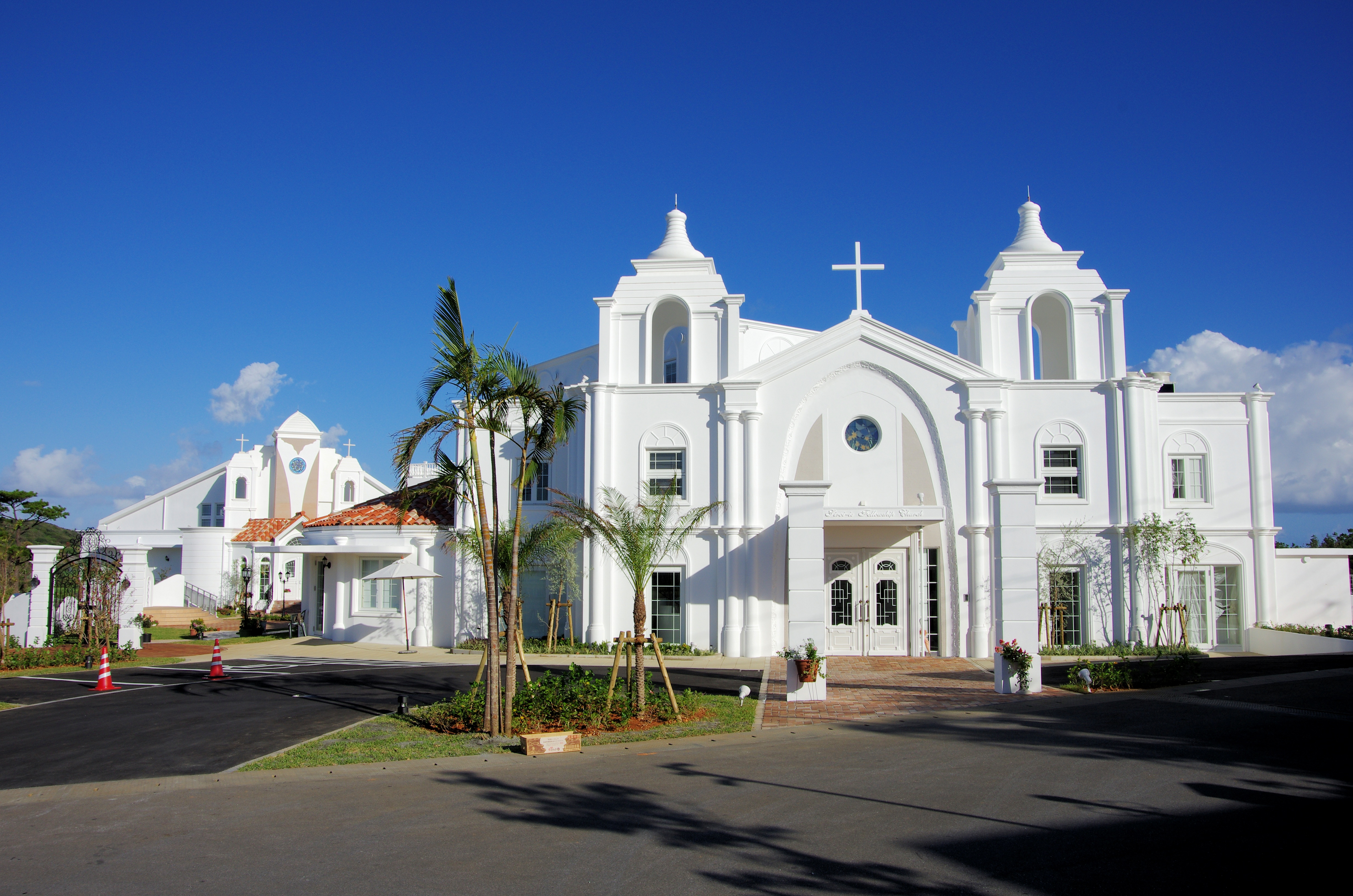
Shiroi-ie Fellowship Church in Yomitan, Okinawa Prefecture

In 2020, Protestants in Japan constituted a religious minority of about 0.45% of the total population or 600,000 people. The United Church of Christ in Japan is the largest Protestant denomination.

James Curtis Hepburn, M.D., LL.D. (March 13, 1815 – June 11, 1911) was the first Presbyterian missionary to Japan, arriving in 1859, the same year as the first ordained representatives of the Anglican Communion, the Rev., later Bishop, Channing Moore Williams, founder of Rikkyo University, Tokyo, and the Rev. John Liggins of the Episcopal Church in the United States of America.

Hepburn went to Japan initially as a medical missionary with the American Presbyterian Mission opening a clinic in Kanagawa Prefecture, near present-day Tokyo. He later founded the Hepburn School, which developed into Meiji Gakuin University, and wrote a Japanese–English dictionary. In the dictionary's third edition, published in 1886, Hepburn adopted a new system for romanization of the Japanese language (Rōmajikai). This system is widely known as Hepburn romanization because Hepburn's dictionary popularized it. Hepburn also contributed to the Protestant translation of the Bible into Japanese. Hepburn returned to the United States in 1892. On March 14, 1905, Hepburn's 90th birthday, he was awarded the decoration of the Order of the Rising Sun, third class. Hepburn was the second foreigner to receive this honor.

Divie Bethune McCartee was the first ordained Presbyterian minister missionary to visit Japan, in 1861–1862. His gospel tract translated into Japanese was among the first Protestant literature in Japan. In 1865 McCartee moved back to Ningbo, China, but others have followed in his footsteps. There was a burst of growth of Christianity in the late 19th century when Japan reopened its doors to the West. Protestant church growth slowed dramatically in the early 20th century under the influence of the military government during the Shōwa period.

The post–World War II years have seen increasing activity by evangelicals, initially with North American influence, and some growth occurred between 1945 and 1960. The Japanese Bible Society was established in 1937 with the help of National Bible Society of Scotland (NBSS, now called the Scottish Bible Society), the American Bible Society, the British and Foreign Bible Society. The Seventh-day Adventist Church's Japan presence: William Calhoun Grainger was an educator, college president, and pioneer missionary to Japan. Teruhiko Okohira, who had been a Healdsburg College student from Japan, invited Grainger to accompany him back to his homeland to spread the Advent message there. In 1896 the Foreign Mission Board agreed to send him to Japan. He arrived at Yokohama Harbor on November 19, 1896. Before long he and Okohira opened Shiba Japanese-English Bible School in Tokyo. By the end of 1899 the first Seventh-day Adventist Church in Japan was organized with thirteen members. As of June 30, 2023, the denomination reported 97 Churches, 48 Companies and 15,095 official members.

=== Other denominations ===
==== Jehovah's Witnesses ====
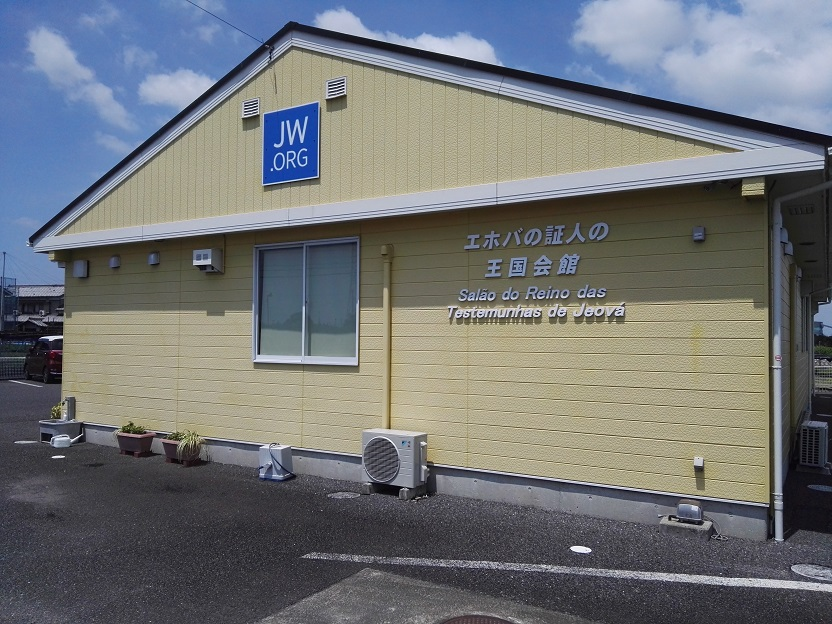
Kingdom Hall of Jehovah's Witnesses, Nishio, Aichi Prefecture

In 2020, the number of Jehovah's Witnesses was 212,683 active publishers, united in 2,964 congregations; 273,856 people attended annual celebration of Lord's Evening Meal in 2020. Before 1945 they were banned in Japan. Many Jehovah's Witnesses were jailed; one of them, Katsuo Miura, was in the Hiroshima prison during the atomic bombing of Hiroshima.

==== Church of Jesus Christ of Latter-day Saints ====
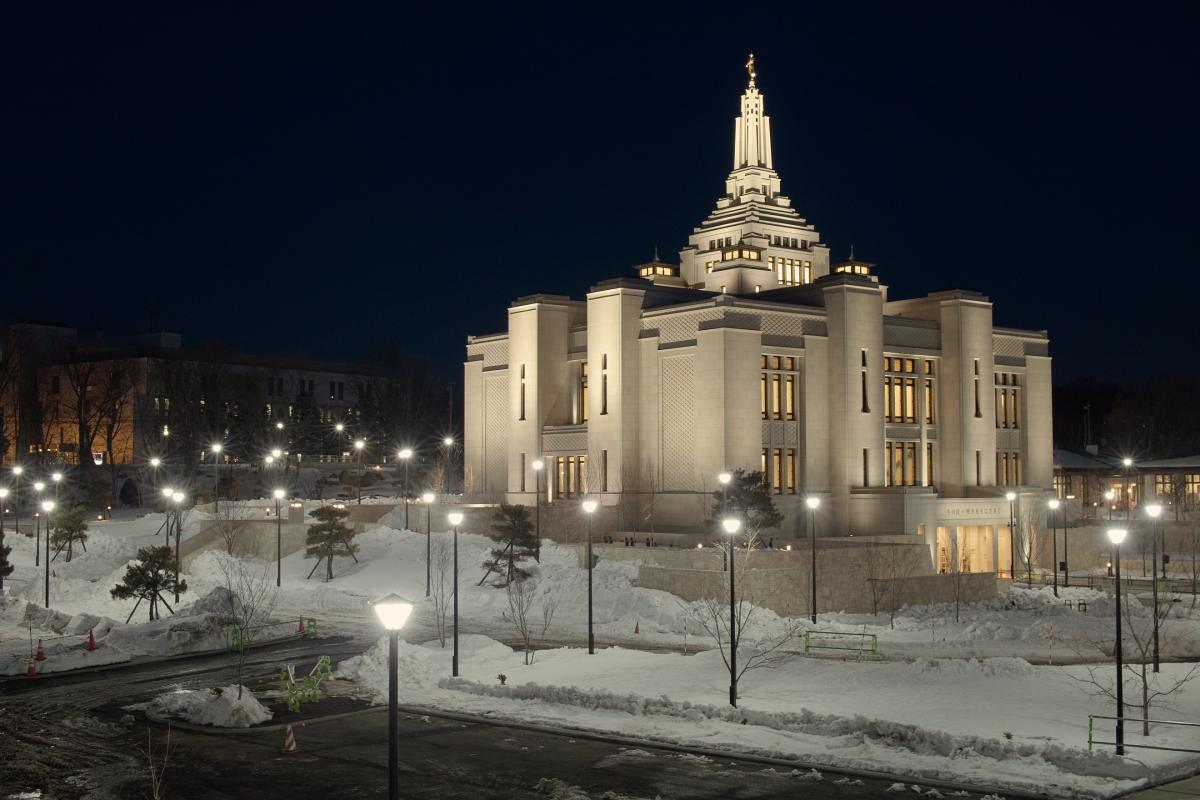
The Sapporo Japan Temple of the LDS Church

As of year-end 2009, The Church of Jesus Christ of Latter-day Saints (LDS Church) reported 29 stakes, 14 districts, 163 wards, 125 branches, 7 missions, and 3 temples in Japan. As of July 2016, there were 128,216 members. The LDS Church was established in Japan in 1901 when the first LDS Church missionaries arrived on August 12, 1901. Among them was Heber J. Grant, at the time a member of the Quorum of the Twelve, and later the 7th President of the Church.

As of year-end 2024, the LDS Church reported 129,622 members in Japan, with 22 stakes, 11 districts, 143 wards, 88 branches, 7 missions, and 4 temples, with one additional temple announced.

== Art and media ==
Christian art in Japan dates back to the 16th century, with traditional shrines and Japanese artwork depicting the Christian faith within Japan. When Christianity was illegal in Japan, the local Christians developed distinctive forms of Christian art, literature, and cultural practices.

Ryunosuke Akutagawa depicts a Christian monastery in his short story, "The Martyr". Yukiko Takayama mentioned having written a novel about a Christian samurai in her interview with G-Fan.

Christian media is prevalent within the popular culture of Japan, despite its relatively small Christian population. Superbook was a mainstream anime during the 1980s, and it remains a popular Christian media franchise worldwide. Because of this Christianity remains a popular topic in manga and anime, including Trigun and Saint Young Men. Gospel and contemporary Christian music are part of popular music in the country, the largest Christian music festival in the country is the Sunza Rock Festival, which is where many of Japan's CCM artists and bands perform.

International Christian University is the alma mater of several Japanese media professionals, including Kaz Hirai, the former chairman of Sony. Sony owns several Christian media studios and outlets through its subsidiary Affirm Films, including the Pure Flix streaming service.

== Notable Japanese Christians ==
During the first Catholic missions from the 17th century, several high ranked people converted, including Dom Justo Takayama and Hosokawa Gracia. Among the original twenty-six martyrs of Japan, Paulo Miki is the best known. Catholics venerate him as one of the patron saints of Japan.

Christianity in the Meiji-period saw several major educators and Christian converts as follows:

- Kanzo Uchimura (内村鑑三, Kanzō Uchimura) (1861–1930), a Protestant, a headmaster of a head of the First Higher School. He was also the founder of Nonchurch movement, one of the earliest indigenous Japanese Christian movements. His autobiography Why have I become a christian? (余は如何にして基督信徒となりし乎, yo wa ika ni shite Kirisuto shinto to narishi ka), focusing on his conversion influenced young generations in those days.
- Joseph Hardy Neesima (Jō Nījima) (新島襄, Niijima Jō) (1843–1890), a Protestant and the founder of Doshisha University.
- Nitobe Inazō (新渡戸稲造, Nitobe Inazō) (1862–1933), a Protestant and the founder of Tokyo Woman's Christian University.
- Hideyo Noguchi (野口英世, Noguchi Hideyo) (1876–1928), a Protestant and prominent bacteriologist.
- Umeko Tsuda (津田梅子, Tsuda Umeko) (1864–1929), a Protestant and the founder of Joshi Eigaku Juku (today Tsuda University).

In the 20th century, two major contributors to Protestant Christian theology emerged in Japan: Kosuke Koyama (小山晃佑, Koyama Kōsuke), who has been described as a leading contributor to global Christianity, and Kazoh Kitamori (北森嘉蔵, Kitamori Kazō), who wrote The Theology of the Pain of God (神の痛みの神学, kami no itami no shingaku). Social rights activist and author Toyohiko Kagawa ((賀川豊彦, Kagawa Toyohiko), who was nominated for both the Nobel Peace Prize and the Nobel Prize in Literature, has also become known outside Japan, due to his evangelical work mainly in Japan, social work, and labor activism.

Mitsuo Fuchida (淵田美津雄, Fuchida Mitsuo) (3 December 1902 – 30 May 1976) was a Captain in the Imperial Japanese Navy Air Service and a bomber pilot in the Imperial Japanese Navy before and during World War II. After World War II ended, Fuchida became a Christian and an evangelistic preacher. In 1952, Fuchida toured the United States as a member of the Worldwide Christian Missionary Army of Sky Pilots. Fuchida spent the rest of his life telling others what God had done for him around the world. In February 1954, Reader's Digest published Fuchida's story of the attack on Pearl Harbor. He also wrote and co-wrote books including, From Pearl Harbor to Golgotha (aka From Pearl Harbor to Calvary). His story is told in God's Samurai: Lead Pilot at Pearl Harbor (The Warriors).

Chiune Sugihara (杉原 千畝, Sugihara Chiune; 1 January 1900 – 31 July 1986) was a Japanese diplomat who served as Vice Consul for the Japanese Empire in Lithuania. He converted to Orthodox Christianity in 1935 while serving in China as a diplomat. During World War II, he helped several thousand Jews leave the country by issuing transit visas to Jewish refugees so that they could travel to Japan. Most of the Jews who escaped were refugees from German-occupied Poland or residents of Lithuania. Sugihara wrote travel visas that facilitated the escape of more than 6,000 Jewish refugees to Japanese territory, risking his career and his family's life. In 1985, Israel honored him as Righteous Among the Nations for his actions.

The 20th century also saw two Christian novelists of renown: Ayako Miura (三浦綾子, Miura Ayako; 1922–1999) was a Protestant writer known for her works, one of the most influential being Shiokari Pass (塩狩峠, shiokari tōge; 1968). Shusaku Endo (遠藤周作, Endō Shusaku) was a Catholic novelist renowned for his works focusing on Christianity in Japan, including Silence (沈黙, chinmoku).

=== Christian Prime Ministers ===
While Christians account only for 1% of the population, there have been nine Christian Prime Ministers of Japan (three Catholics and six Protestants).

==== Catholic ====
- Hara Takashi – leader of the 19th government and the 10th Prime Minister (1918–1921).
- Shigeru Yoshida – leader of the 45th, 48th, 49th, 50th, and 51st governments and the 32nd Prime Minister (1946–1947 and 1948–1954).
- Tarō Asō – leader of the 92nd government and the 59th Prime Minister (2008–2009).

==== Protestant ====
- Viscount Takahashi Korekiyo – leader of the 20th government and the 11th Prime Minister (1921–1922 and 1932).
- Tetsu Katayama – leader of the 46th government and the 33rd Prime Minister (1947–1948).
- Ichirō Hatoyama – leader the 52nd, 53rd, and 54th governments and the 35th Prime Minister (1954–1956).
- Masayoshi Ōhira – leader of the 68th and 69th governments and the 43rd Prime Minister (1978–1980).
- Yukio Hatoyama – leader of the 94th government and the 60th Prime Minister (2009–2010).
- Shigeru Ishiba - leader of the 102nd and 103rd government and the 65th Prime Minister (2024–2025).

=== Christian politicians ===
In Japan's 2025 House of Councillors election, 522 people ran for office. Of these, three disclosed their Christian faith.

== See also ==
- Religion in Japan
- Protestantism in Japan
- Nippon Sei Ko Kai
