= Bernard Jean Bettelheim =

Hungarian-born Christian missionary (1811–1870)

- Bettelheim at an unknown date
- Born: June 1811; Pressburg, Austrian Empire
- Died: February 9, 1870 (aged 58); Brookfield, Missouri, United States
- Education: University of Padua
- Occupations: Physician, missionary
- Employer: Loochoo Naval Mission
- Military career
- Allegiance: United States
- Branch: Union army
- Service years: 1863
- Unit: 106th Illinois Infantry Regiment
- Conflicts: American Civil War

Bernard Jean Bettelheim (June 1811–9 February 1870) was a physician who served as the first Anglican missionary to Japan. Born to a Hungarian Jewish family in Pressburg (now known as Bratislava), Bettelheim was educated at a yeshiva in Trebitsch before studying medicine at various universities. He graduated from the University of Padua in 1836 and began to travel across the Mediterranean practicing medicine. While serving as a surgeon to an Ottoman military regiment in Manisa in 1840, he converted to Anglican Christianity. He traveled to London later that year and attempted to enter the Church Mission Society and preach to Jewish communities in the Mediterranean. He was rejected due to his recent conversion. After several years practicing medicine in London, he met Herbert Clifford, who had long sought to organize a Christian mission to the Ryukyu Kingdom. Bettelheim agreed to join his Loochoo Naval Mission and left with his family from England in 1845.

After several months studying Chinese in Hong Kong, Bettelheim arrived in Okinawa in April 1846. He was initially denied permission to land, but sneaked his way on to the island and refused to leave. Ryukyuan authorities had him and his family stay at the Gokoku-ji in Naha, where he lived under constant watch and pressure to leave. He began practicing medicine and preaching on the island, despite orders not to, in the process introducing the smallpox vaccine to the island. A talented linguist, Bettelheim produced a reference grammar and dictionary for the Okinawan language, as well as translations of the Gospels. The Ryukyuan government began to steadily crack down on his attempts to proselytize, although they avoided the use of force in order to forestall a diplomatic incident. Okinawan citizens were ordered to ignore Bettelheim and shut their doors when he approached. In response, he began to break into houses to preach, resulting in him being assaulted in several instances. The Loochoo Naval Mission grew upset with Bettelheim due to his tactics and his frequent appeals to the British government for military assistance.

In 1853, American admiral Matthew C. Perry visited Okinawa, seeking to open it and eventually Japan, to American trade. Bettelheim became enamored with Perry, comparing him to Jesus in his sermons, and served as his translator during treaty negotiations. Bettelheim decided to leave Okinawa in 1854, disillusioned with the prospects of prostelyzing. Afterwards, he settled in the United States, where he continued his translation work and medical practice. He served as a surgeon in the Union Army during the American Civil War, before he was court-martialed on allegations of neglect of duty and discharged. He later settled in Illinois and eventually Missouri, dying there of pneumonia in 1870.

== Early life and career ==
In June 1811, Bernard Jean Bettelheim was born to a Hungarian Jewish family in Pressburg (now known as Bratislava), then under the rule of the Austrian Empire. His father, Moses Bettelheim, was a merchant and devoutly religious. When he was very young, he began attending a yeshiva in Trebitsch operated by his uncle Moses Saper. Bettelheim was purportedly able to read Hebrew, French, and German by the age of nine. He left home when he was a little over thirteen and became a teacher, before returning school to study medicine at the University of Debrecen, the University of Budapest, and the University of Padua. He graduated from Padua with a medical degree in September 1836. He is purported by early biographers to have filed 36 dissertations with the Imperial Court Library in Vienna over the following three years.

After he obtained his degree, Bettelheim traveled around the Mediterranean for his medical work, focusing on cholera treatment. In the late 1830s, he became a surgeon on an Egyptian man-of-war, and by 1840 became the chief surgeon of an Ottoman military regiment in Manisa. There, he became acquainted with a group of British missionaries, who supplied him with Christian religious texts. Convinced, he converted to Anglican Christianity and was baptized by a British chaplain in İzmir. After debating with local rabbis, he published a controversial pamphlet criticizing Judaism.

Bettelheim traveled to Constantinople and spent several months in a dispute over his salary while also studying the Gospels. In late 1840, he left for London and attempted to gain permission from the Church Mission Society to serve as a missionary to the Jewish communities of the Mediterranean. He stayed at the mission society offices alongside several other noted missionaries, including Karl Gützlaff, David Livingstone, and Peter Parker. He entered a protracted disagreement with a group of Church of England bishops, who required that he spend three years studying at the University of Oxford or Cambridge before he could become a minister, seeing his prior degrees as inadequate and pointing to the fact that he had so recently converted to Christianity. He left the Church of England and began attending an independent house church in London. He later rejoined the Church of England in rejection of the disestablishmentarian movement. He soon became a naturalized British citizen and in 1843 married Elizabeth Barwick, the daughter of a thread manufacturer. The following year, the couple had their first child, Victoria Rose Bettelheim.

Bettelheim affiliated with the London Jews' Society, an Anglican missionary society which focused on proselytizing for Christianity among Jewish communities. He claimed that the society had appointed him to travel to Tiberias in Ottoman Palestine to proselytize, while the society claimed that he had only been given a probationary appointment, which was then canceled. He was unable to secure passage to Tiberias from Liverpool and attempted to get another appointment to travel to Salonika in northern Greece. However, the society cut ties with him, and he instead began a medical practice in London.

== Loochoo Naval Mission ==
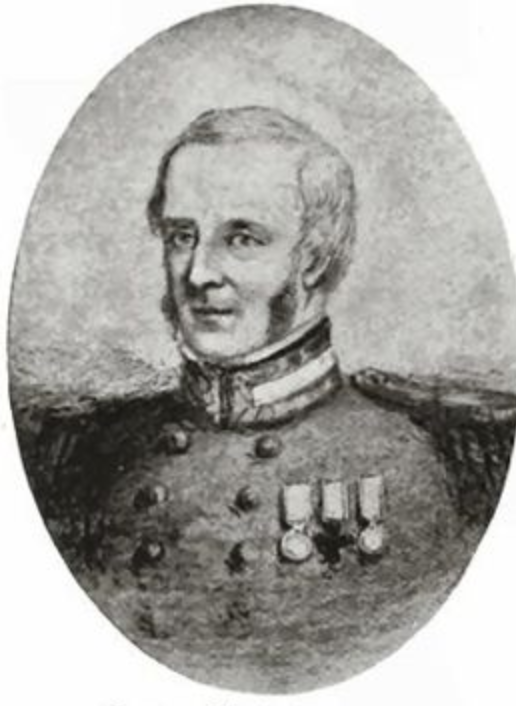
Herbert Clifford, the organizer of the Loochoo Naval Mission

The British naval officer Herbert Clifford attempted to organize a Christian mission to the Ryukyu Kingdom from 1831 to the 1840s. He visited Okinawa as a young sailor in 1816 aboard HMS Lyra and found the Okinawans to be extremely hospitable, but felt immense guilt for not attempting to introduce them to Christianity. He contacted the Church Mission Society, the London Missionary Society, and the Moravian Church missionary society, but none had any interest in his proposal.

A number of friendly European visits to Ryukyu in the 1830s and early 1840s sparked interest in the region among some sailors; it had no formal status as a treaty port, but was used informally as a port of call for naval vessels traveling through the region. Inspired by the British opening of Qing China after the First Opium War, Clifford began fundraising for a private Christian mission to Ryukyu, the Loochoo Naval Mission, in early 1843. The London Mission Society in Hong Kong refused to help him with the project, but he was able to reach out to other naval officers and acquire significant private support from figures such as the 6th Duke of Manchester.

It is unknown how Bettelheim joined the naval mission. Clifford did not know him well, and collected a number of written testimonials to ascertain his suitability for the mission, which he described as "unsurpassed by any missionary who has gone forth from this land to the heathen". Clifford wrote that the mission had a favorable opinion "as far as the Committee can form an opinion of their acquaintance with him". A poor economy and the unexpected difficulties faced by missionaries in China may have limited the number of possible candidates for the mission. Clifford was upset that Bettelheim was not ordained; he reached an agreement with Charles James Blomfield, the Bishop of London, that Bettelheim would be given dimissorial letters after a yearlong probation, upon which he could be ordained by a bishop; however, this never materialized. Bettelheim wrote that he accepted the opportunity to travel to Okinawa due to his desire to "delight my soul in the results of Protestantism on a virgin soil".

=== Arrival in Okinawa ===
Bettelheim quickly closed his medical practice and set off to sea with his family from Portsmouth to Hong Kong in September 1845. Soon after their departure, their son was born; Bettelheim named the child Bernard James Gutzlaff after Karl Gützlaff. Upon his arrival in Hong Kong in January 1846, Bettelheim met with Gützlaff and various other resident missionaries. He wrote to Clifford favorably about the prospects of the mission, conveying promising but inaccurate information he had learned about Ryukyu; he claimed that the Japanese had recently lost all power in the islands, that the Chinese suzerains allowed religious freedom on the island, and that the Okinawans had begged previous groups of European visitors to stay on the islands.

The family stayed in Hong Kong throughout early 1846, attempting to find a ship which would bring them to Okinawa; this was a difficult task, as the island was outside normal trade routes. Bettelheim spent his time in the colony studying the Chinese language. He was able to secure passage on an American ship, the Starling, as the American owner Henry Fessenden was sympathetic to their missionary goals. Fessenden promised that he would return in six months to deliver mail. Bettleheim departed with his family and Ms. James, a nursemaid and tutor. Bettelheim had previously found a Chinese interpreter, but the day prior to their departure he decided not to accompany Bettelheim. Bettelheim was left with Clifford's Vocabulary of the Loo-Choo Language, compiled after his 1816 visit, as his only linguistic material.

Upon the ship's arrival on April 30, Bettelheim was greeted by a French Catholic missionary stationed on Okinawa, Théodore-Augustin Forcade. Unbeknownst to the Loochoo Naval Mission, Forcade had become the first European to reside in the islands in 1844; another Catholic missionary, Pierre-Marie le Turdu, arrived the day after Bettelheim's arrival. The Ryukyuan authorities denied Bettelheim permission to disembark, and the Starling's captain was unwilling to disobey this order. The following day, Bettelheim offered alcohol to a group of Okinawan boatmen and sneaked his baggage into their boats before they left. After he claimed they had stolen his property, the captain agreed to take him and his family to shore. Upon disembarking, Bettelheim refused to leave.

The Ryukyuan authorities escorted Bettelheim and his family to a nearby temple. He spent the rest of the afternoon arguing with a group of officials, who reiterated that he was violating the law. A resident minister (the zaiban-bugyô) from the Satsuma Domain, under which Ryukyu was a protectorate, noted that he had brought a bathtub, six chairs, a mirror, a quilt, closets, and two dogs. His appearance and the presence of the dogs caused him to gain the monikers "Inu-Ganchō" ('spectacled dog man') and "Nanmin-nu-ganchō" ('spectacled man at the Gokoku-ji bluff'), which became the main names he was known as to locals. Ryukyuan authorities referred to him as "Po-te-ling".

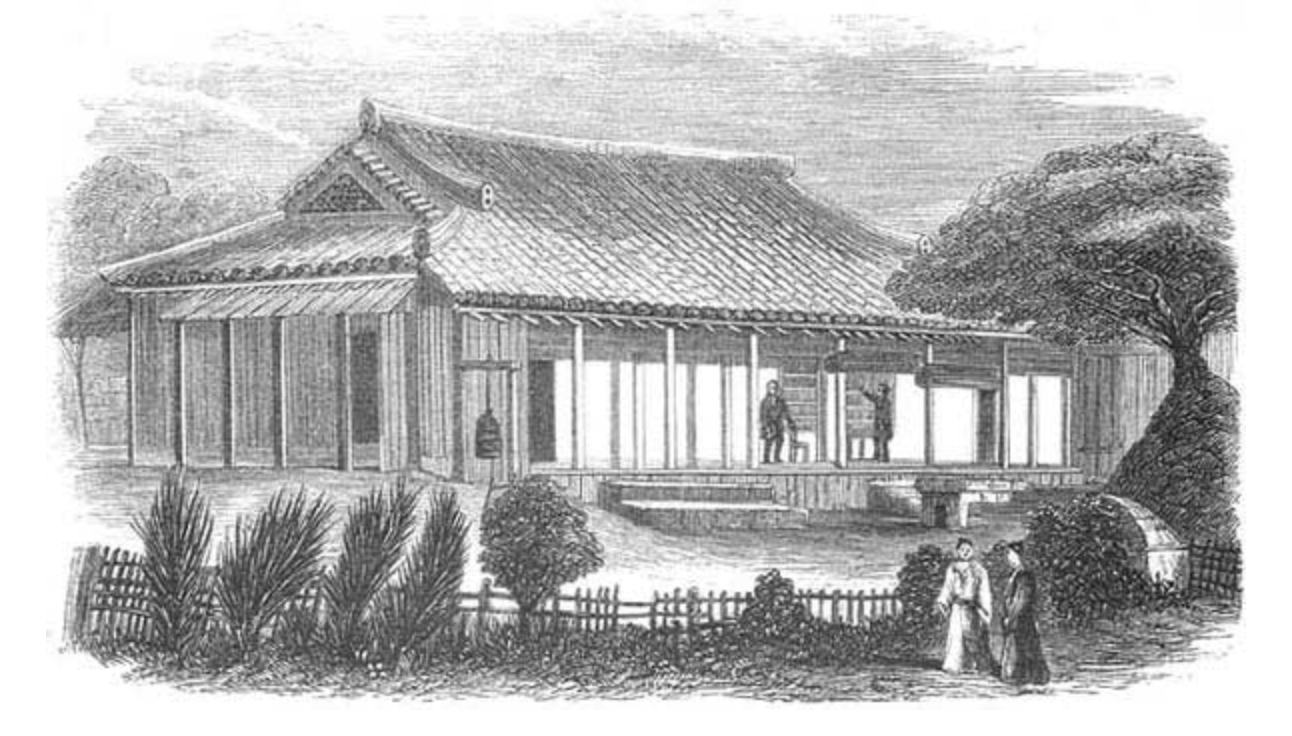
Bettelheim's residence at Gokoku-ji

Bettelheim and his family were later escorted to the Buddhist temple of Gokoku-ji in Naha. Gokoku-ji was located on a promontory called Capstan Rock by Europeans and served as a common stop for visiting boats; the Ryukyuan government likely placed the family there so that they could be easily be observed, and so that they could leave on the next departing ship. He noted that the temple "allows a full view of all the shipping transactions of Lewchew", while George Smith, writing after an 1850 visit, wrote that "a spot better adapted for exclusion from the people, and for the agency of spies, could not have been fixed upon". As a result, his house often hosted meetings between foreigners and Ryukyuan officials. He later commissioned a group of visiting sailors to build him a 50 ft (20 m) flagpole from the beam of a warship, which he used to mark his residence as a port of call. The Ryukyuan government constructed guard posts and stationed a group of fifteen nobles outside the temple, ostensibly to protect his family from criminals.

The day after Bettelheim's arrival, the mayor of Naha presented him with a notice calling on him to leave on the Starling as soon as the weather was favorable. He responded by presenting an offering of oils, books, a bag of coins, and an American clock as a gift to the king. Included within this gift was a Christian pamphlet, which led authorities to suspect that he may have ties to the existing missionaries. Bettelheim emphasized his medical credentials when writing to the government, distancing himself from the Catholics and stressing that he had not come for business reasons. He repeatedly attempted to hire maids to assist him with food and laundry, explaining that his family was sick and that he was suffering from insomnia. this was denied due to laws banning the hire of Okinawan women by foreigners. Buddhist religious services continued to be practiced at Gokoku-ji, greatly upsetting him. Rites were halted after he complained that a monk visiting the temple while his wife was there was inappropriate, since the wives of the Ryukyan nobility were hidden from foreigners. He proclaimed this as a victory for Christianity.

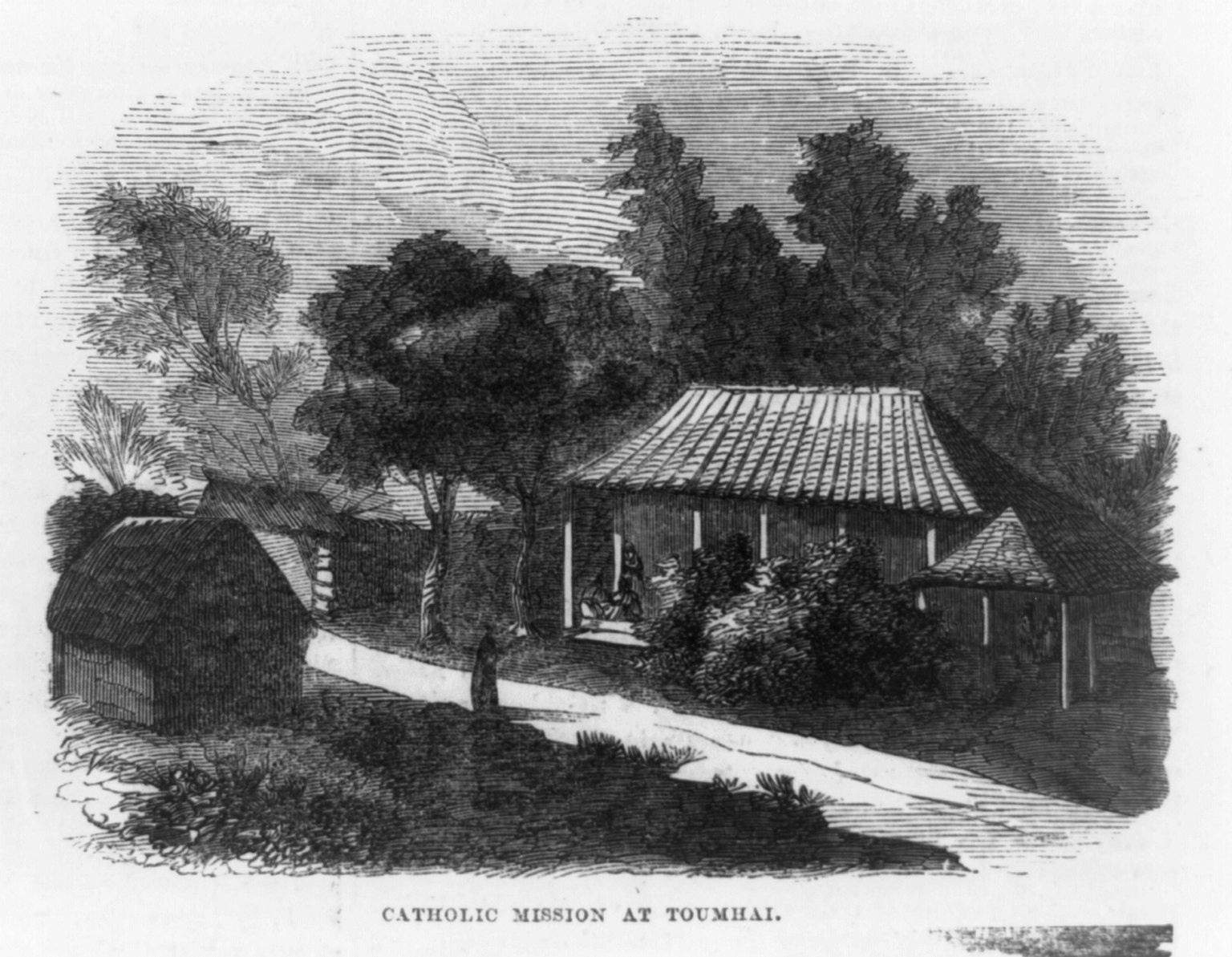
The Catholic missionaries' residence at Tomari, 1855

Bettelheim and the Catholic missionaries saw each other as competitors and engaged in theological debate. Bettelheim tried to stay on good terms with them, expressing hopes that their religious differences would not impede their relationship. Forcade thought poorly of Bettelheim, writing that he was a "so-called" doctor sent on behalf of a philanthropic society, and criticizing him for being boisterous and bringing "too much luggage for this country" in the form of his family. Bettelheim tried to solicit an invitation to dine with the visiting French admiral Jean-Baptiste Cécille, but Forcade ignored him. However, Cécille later invited him on board his flagship. Forcade wrote that he drank an excessive amount of alcohol, while Le Turdu wrote that he simply requested wine and books, the former of which was then provided. Le Turdu was left alone after Forcade's departure with Cécille, and Bettelheim reciprocated by giving him religious books and cakes made by his wife, which were hesitantly accepted.

In October 1846, the British admiral Thomas Cochrane visited Okinawa and met with Bettelheim. Cochrane, likely responding to Chinese complaints about Bettelheim's presence, accused him of impersonating a British official and called for him to be denaturalized. However, Cochrane refused Okinawan officials to take him away from the island, denying that he was a British subject and stating that he was providing a valuable service through his medical practice. This greatly confused Ryukyuan officials; a Chinese interpreter identified Bettelheim as German, while the zaiban-bugyō suspected Cochrane of lying about his nationality. Government monitoring of the missionaries increased as per directions from the Satsuma Domain and fears of a British conspiracy. Officials followed them wherever they went and banned them from acquiring any local currency. Locals were mandated to shut their doors and gates when the missionaries approached.

=== Missionary and medical work ===
After Cochrane left, the Ryukyuan government placed formal restrictions on Bettelheim, forbidding him from practicing medicine or opening a school. When he requested permission to teach medical practice to locals, the officials responded that local physicians could obtain medical education in China. They also claimed that the common people were unintelligent and could not learn English or "become qualified to conduct important matters." Nevertheless, he continued to seek out patients and introduce Western medical concepts. The government moved his patients to other locations after he visited in order to prevent follow-up procedures. However, he was able to gain respect as a skilled doctor, treated some officials, and introduced smallpox vaccination to Okinawa. The Ryukyuan officials permitted him to vaccinate the population, allowing him the chance to meet large numbers of locals.

After gaining confidence in his linguistic ability, Bettelheim began preaching publicly in November 1846. He traveled to marketplaces, condemned idols as meaningless, and proclaimed that God sought to care for the poor. On one Sunday in late November, he purportedly attracted a crowd of several hundred onlookers at a marketplace. His knowledge of the language was limited, and he may not have been understood by his audience. The authorities did not initially attempt to stop his sermons; he received a letter in December warning him that he could be attacked by the populace if he continued preaching, and claimed that Christianity was only applicable to the West. Bettelheim responded that Christianity could reach all peoples, and that he "choose to have to do only with the natives, and nothing with the government.

In case Bettelheim forces his way into homes:

1. Japanese books and important papers must be kept out of eyeshot in advance.

2. Women and children must run away from the house.

3. The samurai must stay at home. They must accuse Bettelheim of an unlawful act, stating "Your action is like that of burglars. Is it the morality of Jesus?"

4. If Bettelheim still insists on staying, they, with the aid of relatives, neighbors, and friends, must force him out, shouting at him for a rascal.

5. If Bettelheim still resists outrageously, they are allowed to twist his hand.

— Ryukyuan government notice distributed in Naha, 30 November 1849

Bettelheim saw a great urgency to proselytizing, believing that he had a mission to convert the inhabitants of Okinawa, and likely sensing that he would have limited time on the island due to government persecution. The Ryukyuan government was very hesitant to halt his religious practice with force, fearing that using force would "invite a great calamity" in the form of foreign military intervention. As such, they utilized various nonviolent countermeasures to disrupt his preaching; constables would proceed in front of him when traveling, telling citizens to avoid and turn their backs on him. Occasionally, people would put baskets full of feces in front of him and run away.

As his street preaching began to be disrupted, Bettelheim began to focus on distributing religious tracts. These were consistently given back to him after he handed them off. He attempted to use cakes and coins to bribe children to distribute them; after this scheme was discovered, locals attacked him by throwing stones. He began using more extreme tactics as government suppression increased. He began to throw stones at doors, climb over walls, and sneak into houses to preach. Authorities directed women and children to run away if they saw him enter their house, asked for books and other materials suggesting literacy to be hidden from sight, and ordered residents to twist his hand and physically remove them from their homes. He was physically assaulted multiple times, and his wife was once attacked on the street.

In early January 1850, Bettelheim entered the house of a samurai and began to preach. After he was asked to leave, he was purported to have lain on his back on the ground. The family called a group of policemen over, who grabbed each of his limbs and threw him onto the ground outside. Bettelheim hit the ground hard and was left unconscious a time in front of the house. His wife was alerted to the incident and found him on the ground. She attempted to get help moving him to safety but received no help from the policemen, waiting until a sympathetic passerby assisted. He recovered consciousness, but was left bedridden for several days afterwards due to back injuries.

It is unknown how many Okinawans Bettelheim was able to convert during his mission. One source claims that he performed four baptisms, while another states that he made five converts. He was able to convert one of his guards, a young man named Satchi Hama. In response, Bettelheim alleged that Satchi was placed in stocks, tortured, and beaten in the head with sticks by his family in an attempt to force him to recant his beliefs. He died in 1851 from this abuse. Bettelheim came to view Ryukyuan society very negatively, lambasting earlier depictions of them as exceptionally friendly and innocent.

=== Linguistics ===
The zaiban-bugyō noted soon after Bettelheim's arrival that he diligently studied language, writing that he "seems to understand the Chinese characters, Mandarin, and the language of this land generally." The Ryukyuan government attempted to halt him from learning the language to lessen his ability to preach; they feigned lower literacy rates among the common people by hiding reading material, and forbade translators from assisting him with religious texts. He focused on studying the Okinawan language and translating religious works when he was kept from preaching. While staying on the island, he translated the four gospels and portions of the Book of Common Prayer into Okinawan. He wrote a Okinawan-English dictionary and drafted reference grammars for Okinawan and Japanese.

=== Political difficulties ===
The Ryukyuan government made requests to all visiting Western vessels to remove Bettelheim, but none complied with this. Ryukyu also attempted to negotiate his removal through diplomatic communications with various countries to no avail.

Another Catholic priest, Matthieu Adnet, arrived in late 1846 and fell ill. Bettelheim visited the mission periodically to give him medication. He eventually died in July 1848. Bettelheim attended his funeral, but privately wrote that it was an "abomination" and a "disgusting exhibition". Le Turdu tried to find another priest to come to the island and work with him, but was unsuccessful, and he left for Hong Kong. Bettelheim was left as the only missionary in Okinawa. In 1848, Clifford became aware of rumors that Bettelheim had been murdered; he attempted to lobby the Admiralty to dispatch a ship to Okinawa but was unsuccessful. He later learned from a French naval vessel that the rumor was unfounded.

The Loochoo Naval Missions's leadership began to view Bettelheim as a suspect, believing that he was acting irresponsibly and violating his responsibilities as a missionary. Clifford initially tried to secure the help of German missionary Karl Gützlaff in Hong Kong as a coordinator with Bettelheim, but Gützlaff seemed uninterested in the project, and Bettelheim was opposed to him becoming the mission's agent. By 1849, the mission appointed a naval storekeeper in Hong Kong as their agent; from the reports of the storekeeper and various visiting sailors to Okinawa, the mission learned that Bettelheim was feigning the support of the British government and attempting to influence political matters.

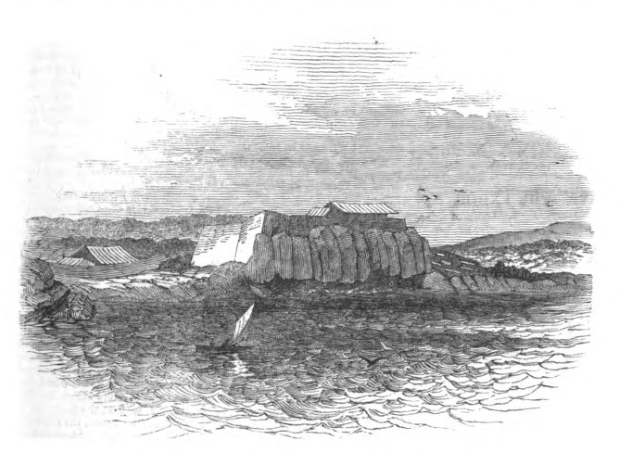
View of Bettelheim's residence from the Naha Harbor, 1851

Bettelheim believed that the presence of European naval vessels served as a deterrent to the Ryukyuan authorities, writing that "those who have power can speak with power" and likening naval action to slapping a misbehaving child. When HMS Pilot and HMS Mariner stopped in Naha in 1849, Bettelheim presented their captains with petitions to Lord Palmerston of the Foreign Office, calling on him to send naval vessels to Okinawa more frequently for his protection. He had the Mariner's captain pass on his complaints to Ryukyuan authorities. The Ryukyuan government responded with a written request for Bettelheim to be removed from the island.

Clifford was greatly upset by Bettelheim for attempting to involve the Foreign Office. Although he publicly defended him, he told him that he had put the mission in danger of being removed from Okinawa, writing to him in 1850 that his "indiscretion in this respect seems to know no bounds" and accusing him of a "overweening fondness for letter writing". Due to Clifford's defense of the mission, Palmerston granted Bettelheim his request of occasional naval visits, to which he felt British subjects were entitled. HMS Reynard visited Okinawa in 1850, and its captain lodged a complaint alleging that Bettelheim was mistreated, warning that attempts to drive him from the island would result in "great displeasure". The Ryukyuan government lessened some of its hostile measures against him after this, but continued in their attempts to force him to leave.

The Anglican bishop George Smith visited Naha in 1850 and 1852. He wrote favorably about Bettelheim and substantiated his accusations of mistreatment. However, he questioned if the mission was worth maintaining due to such persecution, writing that it would likely require "two devoted and discreet clergymen" to continue. Smith saw Bettelheim as overly brash, attributing this to him being a "descendant of Abraham", but wrote that "a man of less fortitude, of gentler texture, and of less sanguine temperament, would probably have sunk into an early grave".

Despite the opposing views of Clifford and the governing committee of the mission, Bettelheim continued to appeal to the British government for intervention. He wrote to Palmerston again in 1851, alerting him of Satchi Hama's martyrdom, and called for British military invention and the establishment of a settler colony to protect the mission. He called for two hundred European setters to be sent to the island in order to make "sure before the Loochooan nation that British influence is established". He grew increasingly frustrated at the mission governance and considered cutting ties with it entirely, disparaging the fact that foreign vessels "consequently assisted us more than our own countrymen". HMS Sphynx arrived in early 1852 to ensure that he was "treated with kindness". Its commander delivered his letters to the regent of Ryukyu, but felt that he would not be in danger if he would "discretely attend to his own affairs".

=== Perry's expedition ===
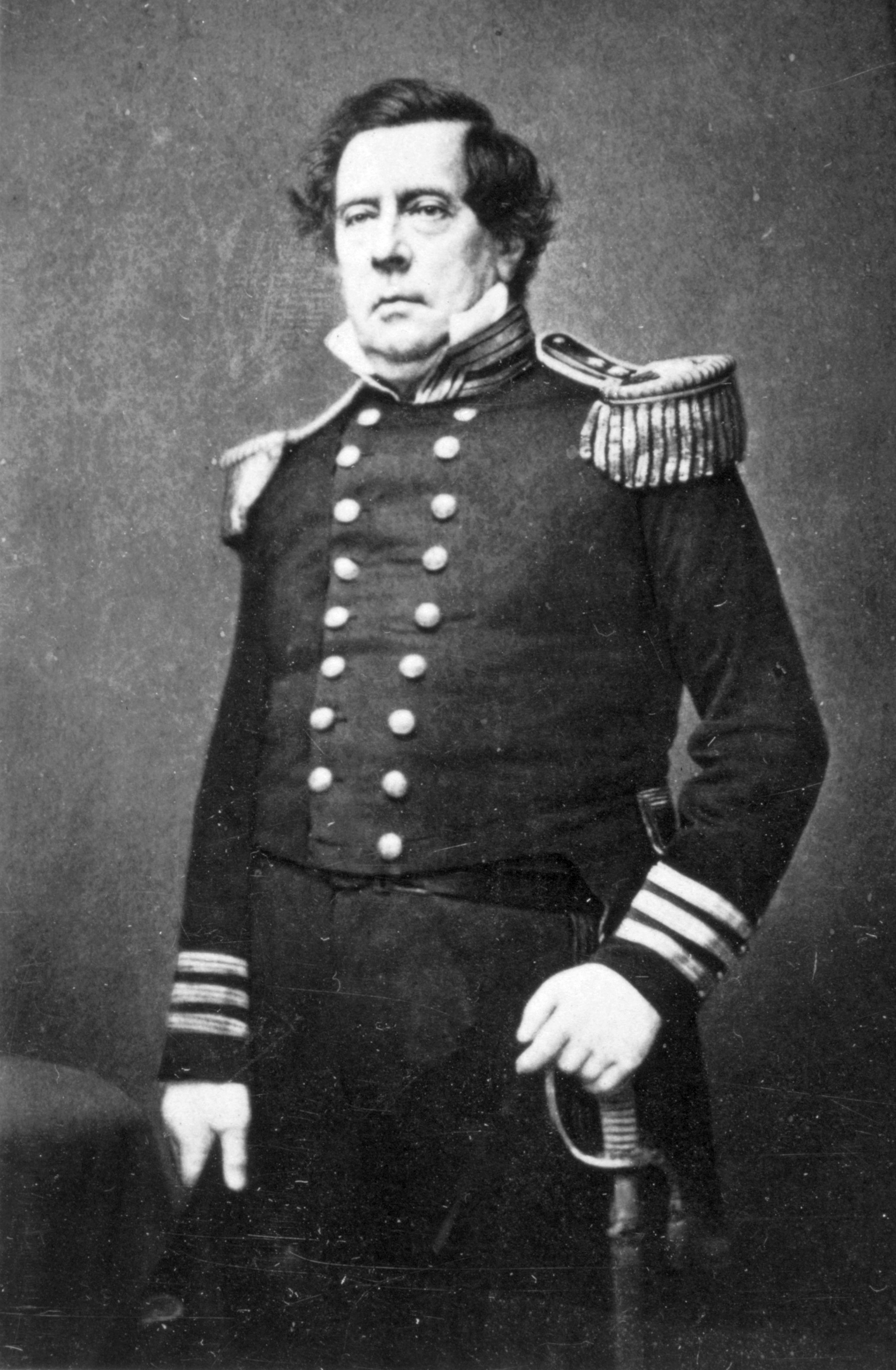
Commodore Matthew Perry, c. 1854

The American naval officer Matthew Perry arrived in Okinawa with three ships on 26 May 1853. Perry sought to force Japan to end its isolationist sakoku policy, and felt that coercion in Ryukyu could serve as a demonstration for later actions against Japan. Bettelheim rowed out to meet him. After a two hour discussion, he became convinced Perry was "so unmistakable an answer [...] to our anxious prayer for Japan" that he "offered to serve him as a son serves a father", dubbing him "quite the man after my own heart". Perry was skeptical of Bettelheim, but wrote that "he will be useful to us, however, and we must make the best of our means".

Bettelheim advised Perry to make himself inaccessible on his ship and not accept any "junior attempts at discussion". He wrote that "Commodore Perry now is the Emperor of Japan, the Susquehanna the sacred place of American majesty; and your officer, on whatever occasion, your Delegate, a sovereign". Following Bettelheim's advice, he agreed to meet with the Ryukyuan regent, but demanded the meeting be held at Shuri Castle. Perry refused any Ryukyuan attempts at an informal meeting, which Bettelheim had advised against. Perry marched up to the palace with his men and refused the regent's offer to have tea at the gates, instead proceeding inside. Bettelheim accompanied Perry, entering Shuri Castle for the first time, and served as a translator for what would become the Loo-Choo Compact. As negotiations dragged on into July, he was invited to negotiations less frequently, as the Americans did not want to be "mixed up with him" to the Ryukyuan officials. He was instead tasked with procuring supplies for the squadron, managing currency, and overseeing a group of "coolie" laborers. He preached aboard Perry's ship each Sunday. A group of officers aboard the USS Plymouth gifted Bettelheim a silver goblet.

Bettelheim became enamored with Perry; when a group of American crewmen, including Perry, attended one of his sermons, he compared Perry's attempts to open Japan to Jesus's religious mission. Many of the attending crewmen thought the comparison was blasphemous, although Perry did not seem to consider it so. Naval officer George Henry Preble noted that Perry had hung up engraved portraits of Perry and Queen Victoria on the wall of his home. Preble wrote that Bettelheim was a "manifest destiny man" who believed that the Ryukyus were destined by divine providence to become Christian.

=== Departure ===
By 1854, Bettelheim had decided to leave Okinawa. He wished to publish his translated editions of the scriptures, sought to secure proper education for his children, and felt anxious over declining eyesight.

In early 1854, a Russian naval ship stopped in Naha. Bettelheim went on board the ship and talked with the novelist Ivan Goncharov and gave him information on the island. Goncharov judged his character poorly, writing that "he was a real prattler. [...] Since his way of talking, turn of expressions, conversation, and compliments were somehow or other brusque and secretive, these proved to be his disadvantage." The Russian crew later inquired about Bettelheim to an Okinawan; the man purportedly responded in English "Very bad man!"

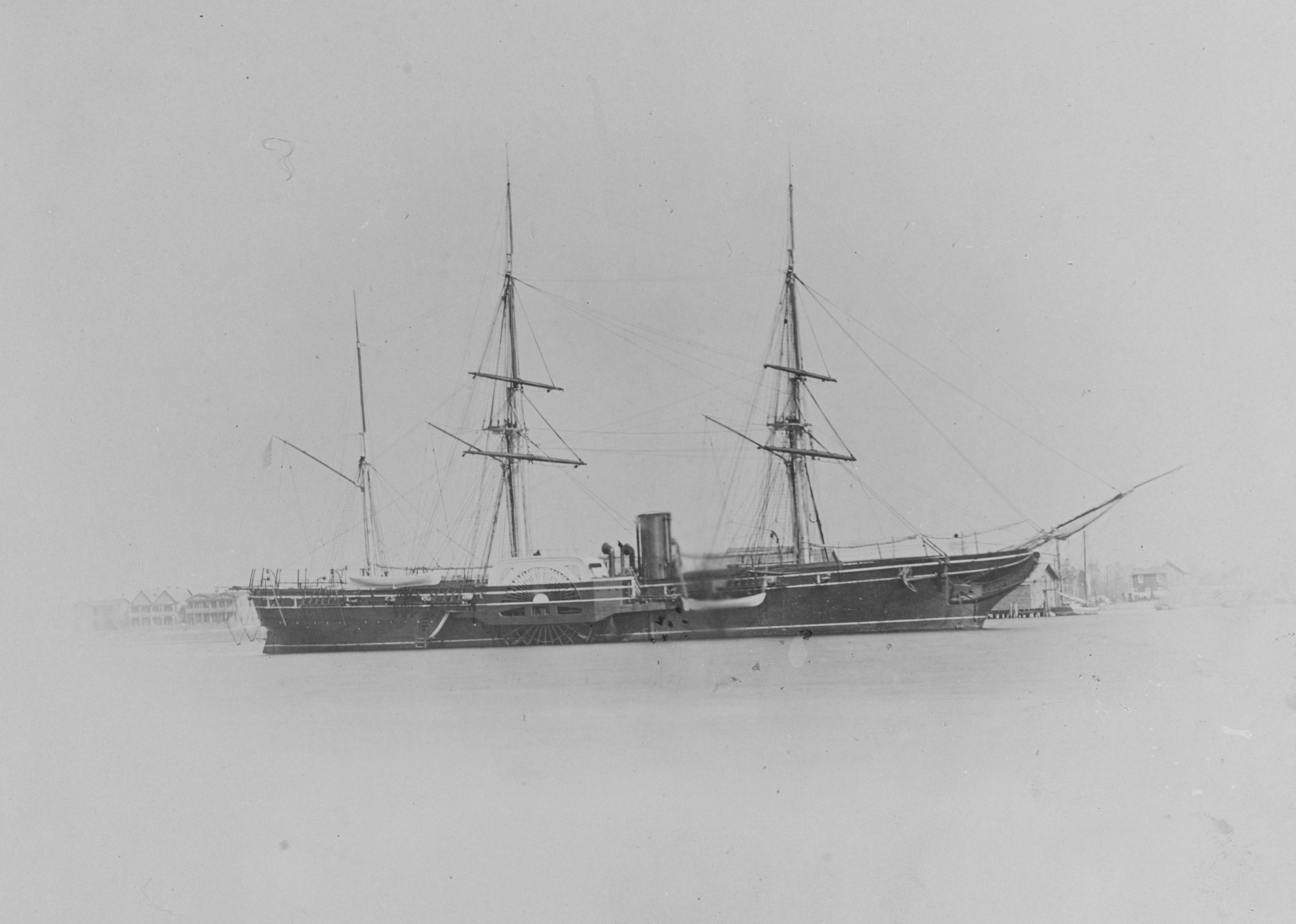
Bettelheim left Okinawa aboard the USS Powhatan

E. H. Moreton, a new missionary from the Loochoo Naval Mission, arrived with his wife and son shortly before Bettelheim departed. They were also taken to Gokoku-ji, and Ryukyuan requests for them to leave were rejected. Bettelheim and the Moretons spent several months working together; Moreton initially served as a lookout as Bettelheim preached door to door, but he had gained enough language proficiency to preach himself by late April. Perry returned to Okinawa from a visit to Japan in July 1854 and signed the Loo-Choo Compact. During these final negotiations, the Ryukyuan government again asked for Bettelheim to be removed from the island and were told that he had already made plans to leave. On July 16, Bettelheim made a farewell speech in Chinese to a group of locals before leaving on one of Perry's warships, the USS Powhatan, the following day.

By 1854, the Loochoo Naval Mission had become very disillusioned with Bettelheim and condemned his actions. He left Okinawa without informing the committee, not seeking to continue work with the Anglican church. The Moretons continued to face extreme difficulties in preaching, and left the island after two years. The mission halted its operations in 1857.

== Later life and death ==
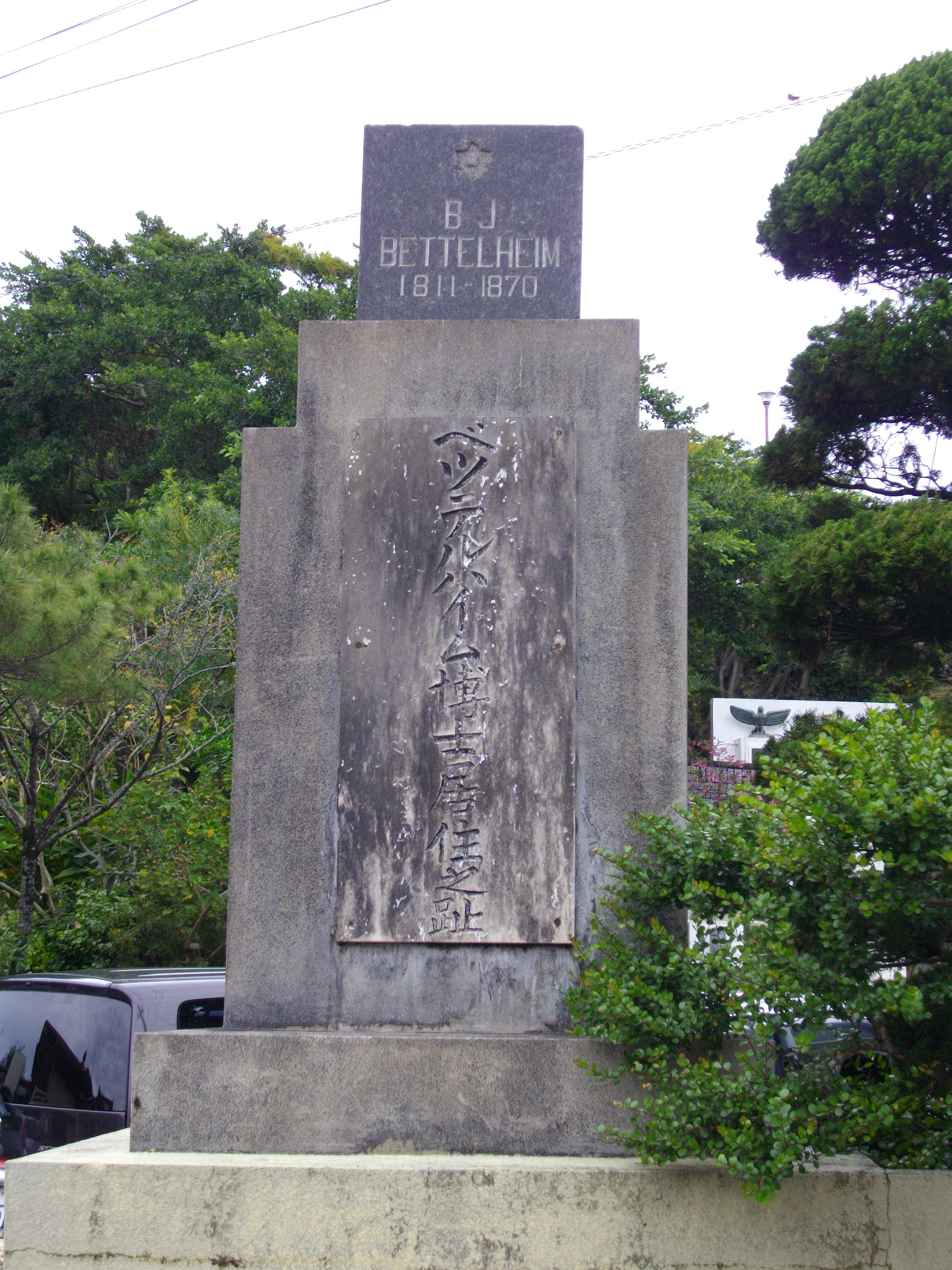
Monument to Bettelheim at Gokoku-ji

From China, Bettelheim and his family boarded a ship bound for England. It stopped for repairs in Bermuda in February 1855; while his family stayed on the island, he decided to take another ship to briefly visit New York City. He was so impressed by the experience that he decided to have his family come over and stay in the United States. While in New York attempted to raise money for a mission to Japan, but was unsuccessful. He moved to Chicago in 1860, where he was ordained as a minister by the Presbytery of Chicago. He met with a Japanese man who had settled in the area and revised a set of Japanese gospels alongside him.

Following the outbreak of the American Civil War, Bettelheim enlisted as a surgeon for the 106th Illinois Infantry Regiment, serving from August to December 1863. Bettelheim was court-martialed in 1864, accused of neglecting a soldier under his care at a field hospital and leaving him to die. Other accusations against him at the trial included charges that he ordered the hospital wagon driver to go fishing for him without pay, that he ate food intended for patients, and that he described his superior officers as drunkards. Witness testimony was conflicted on his neglect of duty, but he was discharged from the military. After the war, he settled with his family in Odell, Illinois, and opened a drugstore, while also spending time giving lectures on Japan and Ryukyu. He moved to Brookfield, Missouri in 1868. Two years later, on February 9, 1870, he died of pneumonia. His wife presented his new drafts of the Japanese gospels to the British and Foreign Bible Society, which were then published in 1873 and 1874.

=== Legacy ===
Bettelheim was honored by a memorial monument erected at Gokoku-ji in 1926. This monument was heavily damaged during the 1945 Battle of Okinawa, but restored in 1954.

The Nippon Sei Ko Kai, the Japanese church of the Anglican Communion, honors Bettelheim as an early evangelist, although it dates its foundation to the arrival of the Episcopalian missionaries Channing Moore Williams and John Liggins in 1859.
