= Henry Fox (soldier) =

German US army soldier

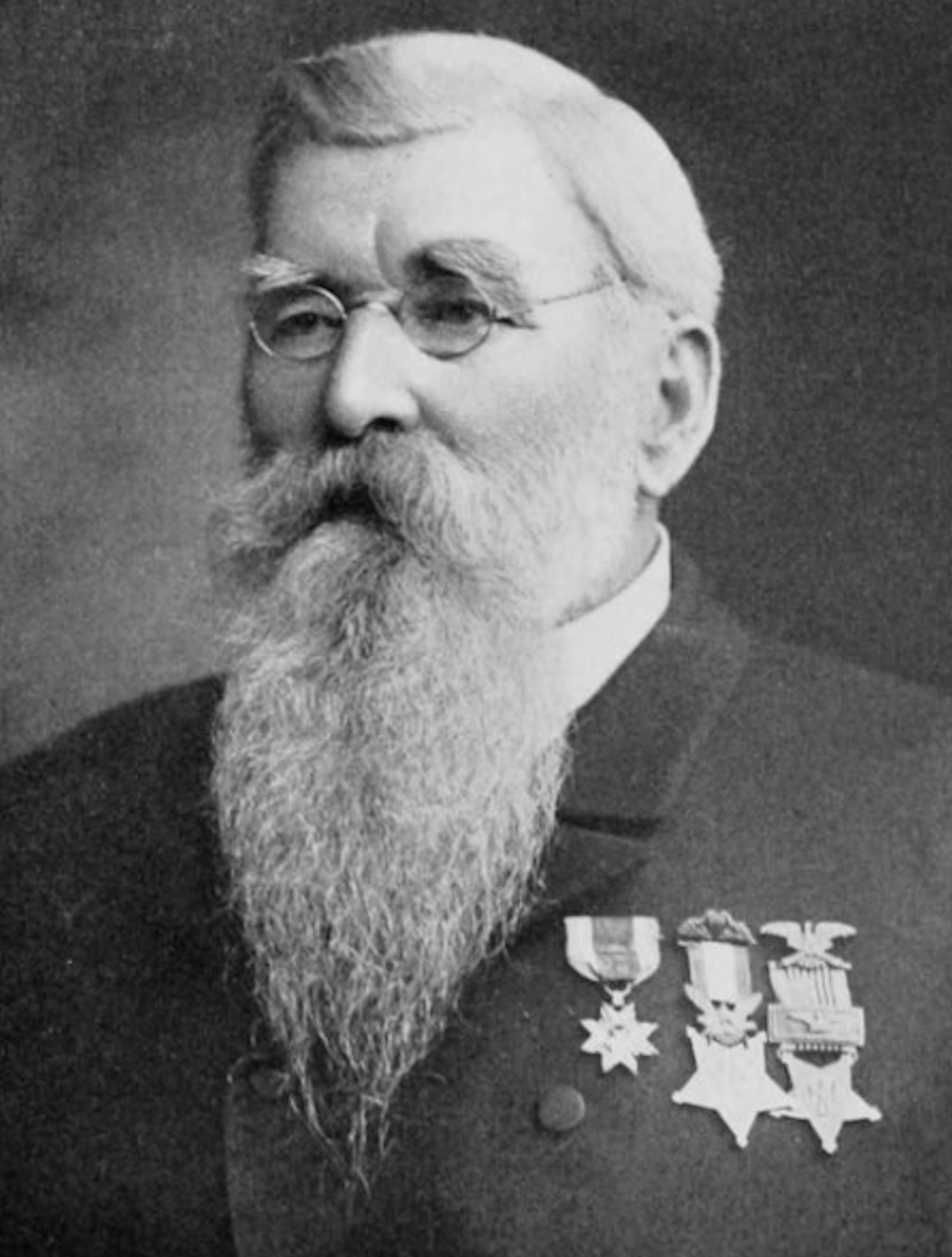
- Medal of Honor recipient Henry Fox c1899
- Born: October 3, 1833; Reutlingen, Kingdom of Württemberg
- Died: September 3, 1906 (aged 72); Dwight, Illinois
- Burial place: Oak Lawn Cemetery
- Military career
- Allegiance: United States of America
- Branch: United States Army
- Rank: Sergeant Captain
- Unit: 106th Illinois Volunteer Infantry Regiment
- Awards: Medal of Honor

Henry Fox (October 3, 1833 to September 3, 1906) was a German soldier who fought in the American Civil War. Fox received the United States' highest award for bravery during combat, the Medal of Honor, for his action near Jackson, Tennessee, on 23 December 1862. He was honored with the award on 16 May 1899.

== Biography ==
Fox was born in Reutlingen, Kingdom of Württemberg on 3 October 1833. He enlisted with the 106th Illinois Volunteer Infantry Regiment in August 1862 and was commissioned as a captain of the 1st Tennessee Infantry Regiment (African Descent) in October 1863. After the war he became a companion of the Illinois Commandery of the Military Order of the Loyal Legion of the United States.

Fox died on 3 September 1906 and his remains are interred at the Oak Lawn Cemetery in Illinois.

== Medal of Honor citation ==
The President of the United States of America, in the name of Congress, takes pleasure in presenting the Medal of Honor to Sergeant Henry Fox, United States Army, for extraordinary heroism on 23 December 1862, while serving with Company H, 106th Illinois Infantry, in action at Jackson, Tennessee. When his command was surrounded by a greatly superior force, Sergeant Fox voluntarily left the shelter of the breastworks, crossed an open railway trestle under a concentrated fire from the enemy, made his way out and secured reinforcements for the relief of his command.

== See also ==
- List of American Civil War Medal of Honor recipients: A–F
