= John Green Williams =

American politician

John Green Williams (1796 – December 15, 1833) was a nineteenth-century politician and lawyer from Virginia. He was the father of the missionary Episcopal Bishop for China and Japan, Channing Moore Williams.

== Early and family life ==
Born near Culpeper, Virginia to William Clayton Williams and Alice Grymes Burwell, Williams had several brothers (including Lewis Burwell Williams who also became a lawyer and delegate for Orange County, Virginia in 1833) and sisters.

He married Mary Ann Cringan on February 28, 1821, in Richmond, Virginia, and was active in the Episcopal Church (particularly Richmond's Monumental Church) as well as the Common Hall. In 1830, the Williams family included six children and two slaves (a man older than 55 and a young woman between 19 and 23 years of age). Their children included the future Rev. William Clayton Williams (long-time rector in Rome, Georgia), Rt. Rev. Channing Moore Williams (1829–1910), attorney John Green Williams Jr. (1823–1870), Robert Findlater Williams (1831–1893), Alice Burwell Williams (1827–1896, who married Carter Harrison and became a widow after the first Battle of Manassas in 1861) and Mary Ogilvie Williams (1826–1864, who married Hubert Pierre Lefebvre).

== Career ==
Williams was admitted to the Virginia bar around 1820. He practiced law in Richmond and the surrounding Henrico County, Virginia. Williams became a member of the Virginia House of Delegates in 1829, and served one term as representative from Henrico County alongside Jacqueline B. Harvie. He succeeded multi-term Democrat Edward C. Mayo. Although again elected in 1831 and 1832, Williams was declared ineligible and not allowed to assume his seat in either year. Both times he was replaced by Robert A. Mayo, who a decade later became one of the founders of the Richmond and Henrico County Society for the Protection of Slave Property.

== Death and legacy ==
Williams died on December 15, 1833, in Charleston, South Carolina en route to St. Augustine, Florida at just 37 years of age, leaving his widow to care for their six young children.

A nephew of the same name, John Green Williams (1843–1922), became a Confederate soldier and courier for Gen. Jubal Early, and after the American Civil War, Commonwealth's Attorney for Orange County.
