= Herbert Clifford =

Officer of the British Royal Navy

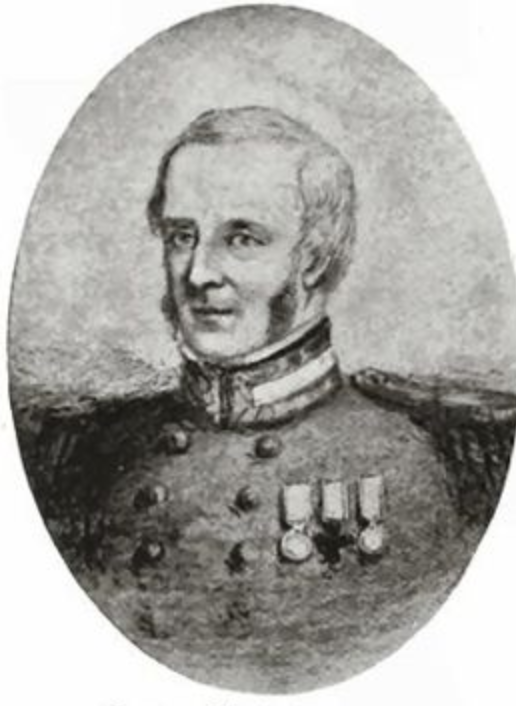
Capt. Herbert John Clifford (1789–1855)

Captain Herbert John Clifford (1789, Nova Scotia – 9 September 1855, Tramore, Waterford, Ireland) was an officer in the Royal Navy during the Napoleonic Wars and the founder of the Loochoo Naval Mission (1843). In 1818, he published Vocabulary of the Language Spoken at the Great Loo-Choo Island, in the Japan Sea, which "remained the single most important source on Ryukyuan in the West for decades."

Clifford's father was John Duke Clifford, and he moved from Cloonlurg, Sligo, Ireland to Halifax, Nova Scotia, and married Elizabeth (Collins) Clifford (1788). Captain Clifford was born the following year. He attended the Halifax Grammar School with General John Beckwith.

He entered the navy in 1802. He was on board HMS Leander when it captured the French frigate Ville de Milan on 23 February 1805. On HMS Boadicea, he took part in the capture of the French frigate Africaine.

During the Napoleonic Wars, he fought in the Mauritius campaign of 1809–1811 and was at the Invasion of Isle de France and was chosen as the bearer of despatches to England. In 1816, he went to Lord Amherst's Embassy to China, with Basil Hall. He then went to the Loo Choo Islands in 1816 and created a dictionary.

Clifford became the founder of the mission to the Loo Choo Islands. He worked with Bernard Jean Bettelheim. He worked as superintendent of the Coast Guard at Waterford, Ireland for 27 years (1823–1855) until his death at age 66.

== Legacy ==
Author Patrick O'Brian wrote about Captain Clifford on board HMS Boadicea is his novel The Mauritius Command.

Clifford wrote Loochoo Naval Mission (LNM): The Claims of Loochoo on British Liberality, London, 1850, 5th edition.
