= Loochoo Naval Mission =

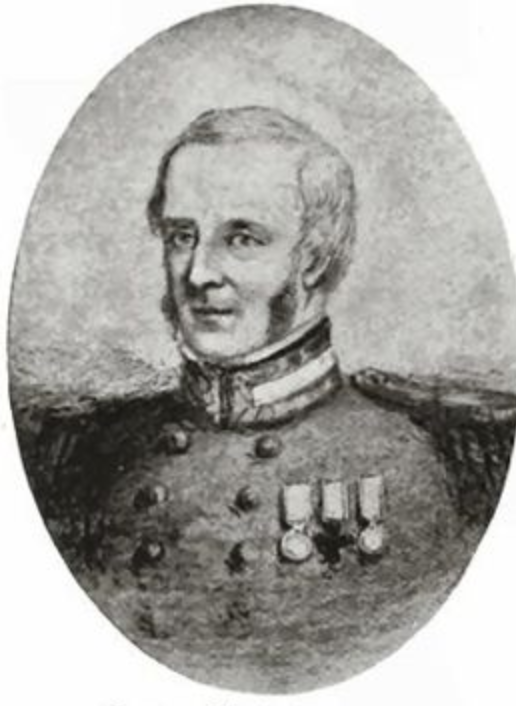
Founder of the Mission Capt. Herbert Clifford

The Loochoo Naval Mission (1843–1861) was a Church of England mission society dedicated in the Christian outreach to outlying Ryukyu Islands. At the time, the islands were a sovereign nation but are now part of Japan.

The work of the mission was significant both in the history of the Ryukyu Kingdom and as the first recorded Anglican and Protestant mission activity in the Japanese archipelago.

== History ==
Begun in February 1842, by a small group of British Royal Navy officers led by Lieutenant Herbert Clifford and Commander Henry Downes, the fund was operationally independent from established Church of England mission societies such as the Society for the Propagation of the Gospel and the Church Mission Society. Lieutenant Clifford had been a member of Captain Basil Hall's 1816 Royal Navy expedition to the Ryukyu Islands.

The mission's first lay mission leader, medical doctor Bernard Jean Bettelheim, landed in the Ryukyu Islands in on April 30, 1846. accompanied by his wife, his two young children, a tutor named Sarah Speight James, and a Cantonese translator.

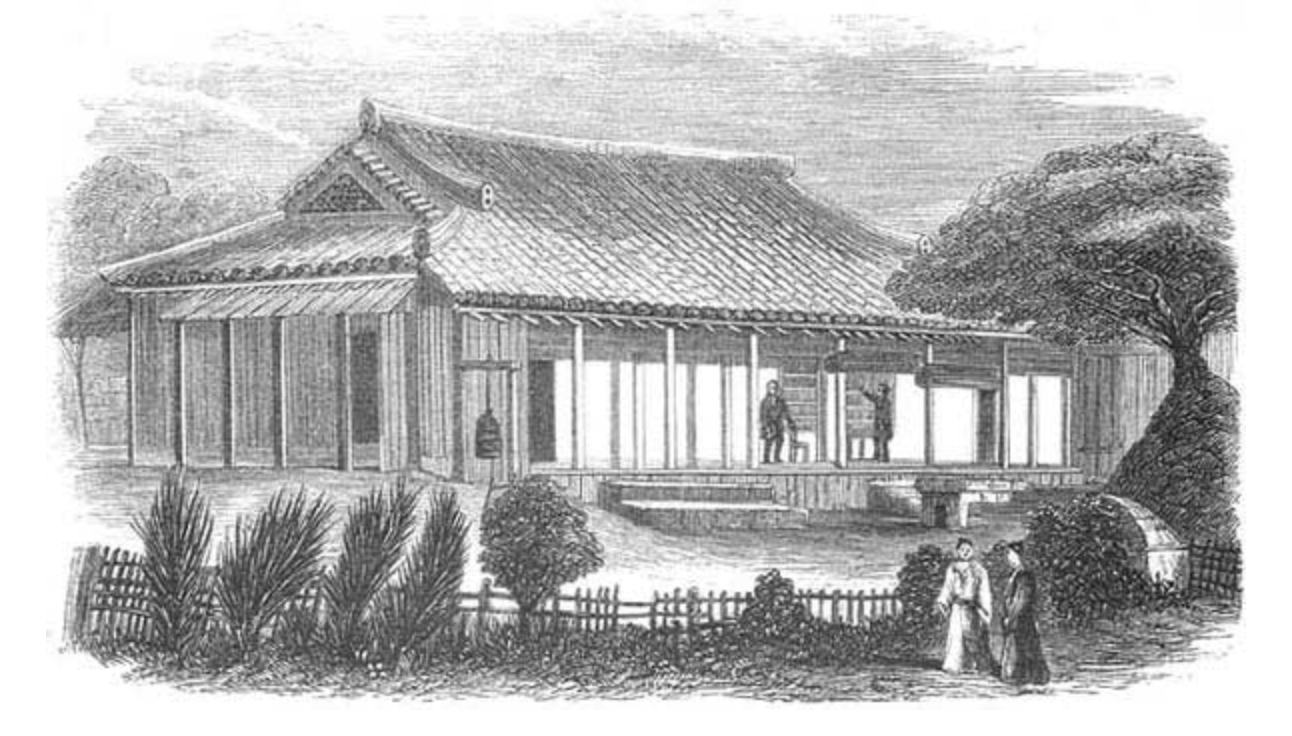
Dr. Bettelheim's residence, Loochoo Naval Mission

Bettelheim's arrival was not a welcome development for the Ryukyuan authorities or much of the local population; when offered temporary shelter, he promptly took up permanent residence in the Gokoku-ji temple and refused to leave for the next seven years. Bettelheim did provide medical care to local residents and made considerable progress in learning the local language, but was not reported to have made any Christian converts in the years he lived on the island. Bettelheim was eventually succeeded in 1854 by Rev. George Harman Moreton.

The work of the Loochoo mission effectively came to a close in 1861 when the balance of funds were given to the Church Mission Society with the aim of financing further Christian outreach in Japan.
