= 106th Illinois Infantry Regiment =

106th Illinois Volunteer Infantry Regiment
- Illinois flag
- Active: September 18, 1862, to July 24, 1865
- Country: United States
- Allegiance: Union
- Branch: Infantry
- Engagements: Siege of Vicksburg; Battle of Bayou Fourche

The 106th Illinois was created during the call for 300,000 volunteers during the summer and fall of 1862. It was raised to be entirely composed of men from Logan County, Illinois, but Company A was raised in Sangamon County and Company K from Menard. The men were organized and trained in Lincoln, Illinois, and mustered into Federal service on September 18, 1862.

== History ==
Leaving Illinois behind, the 106th took a train from Lincoln to St. Louis, Missouri, and thence to Columbus, Kentucky, where it was attached to the Army of the Tennessee under Major General Ulysses S. Grant. They spent much of the winter of 1862-1863 around Jackson, Tennessee, and were tasked with guarding the Mobile & Ohio Railroad in that sector. In late December Confederate general Nathan Bedford Forrest led a cavalry raid on Jackson. This attack took the regiment by surprise and Companies C and G surrendered without a fight. The rest of the regiment built a makeshift breastwork out of railroad ties and bridge timber and fended-off the Rebels with some difficulty. After action reports claim to have not suffered a single man killed or wounded while inflicting many casualties on the enemy.

Casualties
	Combat	Disease	
Officers	0	7	
Enlisted	3	188	
Total	3	195	198

After Forrest's raid, the regiment was assigned to guard railroad stations north of Jackson until May 31, 1863, when it was ordered to Vicksburg, Mississippi, to participate in the siege already taking place there. While en route to Vicksburg, the regiment's steamboat came under fire from Rebel infantry and artillery on Island No. 63 near Clarksdale, Mississippi. Being unable to return much fire, the regiment suffered several men killed and twenty-five wounded, before it even arrived at Vicksburg. Throughout the month of June the 106th served in the trenches of Vicksburg, where the men suffered from high heat, lack of water, lack of shade, and continual fire from the enemy. Toward the end of the siege, they were transferred to the Yazoo River to protect the army's flank and rear against enemy raiders operating north of Vicksburg.

After the surrender of the Confederate bastion on July 4, 1863, the 106th was transferred to Helena, Arkansas, under the command of Major General Frederick Steele. Here it took part in the advance on Little Rock and the Battle of Bayou Fourche on September 10, 1863, which secured Little Rock and most of Arkansas for the Union. For the rest of the war the 106th was assigned to guard posts throughout Arkansas, keeping the peace and guarding against possible Confederate counter-thrusts in that region. The report of the Illinois Adjutant General sums up the 106th Illinois' service succinctly: "Except the siege of Vicksburg, the Regiment was not in any of the most noted battles, but, nevertheless, it performed well its part in putting down a rebellion, and it suffered many privations and hardships marching through swamps and bayous, guarding railroads, government property, fighting and foraging, as is proven by its long list of casualties."

The 106th Illinois was mustered out on July 12, 1865, at Pine Bluff, Arkansas, and the men were discharged on July 24 at Camp Butler near Springfield, Illinois.

== Commanders ==
- Colonel Henry Yates Jr.
- Colonel Charles H. Miller
- Colonel Robert B. Latham
- Lt Colonel George H. Campbell
- Lt Colonel John M. Hurt (died at Pine Bluff, Arkansas, November 18, 1864)

== See also ==
- List of Illinois Civil War Units
