= John Liggins =

19th and 20th-century Episcopalian priest and missionary

The Reverend John Liggins
- Missionary
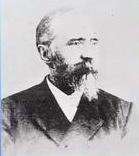
- John B. Liggins

Personal details
- Born: May 11, 1829 Nuneaton, Warwickshire, England
- Died: 8 January 1912 (aged 82) Cape May, New Jersey, United States

Rev. John Liggins (11 May 1829 – 8 January 1912) was an English-born Episcopalian missionary to China and Japan. The first Protestant missionary and ordained representative of Anglican Communion to reach Japan, together with his seminary classmate Channing Moore Williams, he helped found the Nippon Sei Ko Kai.

== Background and early life ==
Liggins was born in 1829 in Nuneaton, Warwickshire, England. In 1841, following the death of his father, Liggins emigrated to the United States of America, initially residing in Philadelphia, Pennsylvania. He was among 14 people confirmed at Emmanuel Episcopal Church in Philadelphia's then-developing Holmesburg neighborhood by Alonzo Potter on April 4, 1848.

== Missionary in China ==
In June 1855, Liggins graduated from the Virginia Theological Seminary (VTS) at Alexandria, Virginia, which had sent several missionaries to China to assist VTS graduate bishop William J. Boone after that country opened to foreigners following the First Opium War. Virginia bishop William Meade on July 1, 1855, ordained Liggins as a deacon with Williams and other classmates, and soon, the Board of Foreign Missions in New York interviewed and accepted both Liggins and Williams as missionaries. In November of the same year, they sailed for China around South America, the ship stopping in Rio de Janeiro to repair damage, and Sydney, Australia to reprovision.

Liggins arrived in Shanghai on June 28, 1856, and attended morning prayer in Chinese the next day (a Sunday) at the Church of Our Saviour, which Boone had established (together with a boarding school). Then they visited the city's other Episcopal Church, Christ Church, in its Chinese section. They needed to learn the local dialect, as well as Mandarin (the main dialect) and the literary language Wen-li—although dictionaries were poor, textbooks unavailable, and most Chinese teachers focused on Confucian classics and memorizing thousands of characters. Boothe, Cleveland Keith (who had arrived in 1851), and local teachers helped the young missionaries, who studied nine hours daily. Soon, Liggins substituted for the British chaplain, John Hobson, who ministered to foreign sailors and the British settlement at Trinity Church. More seasoned VTS graduates (class of 1845), Robert Nelson and Edward Syle, allowed the young missionaries to accompany them as they were able. Before Boone returned to the United States for health and furlough, he ordained both to the priesthood on January 11, 1857.

Soon, Liggins and the others began to preach, including on boat journeys outside Shanghai, especially after Keith and his wife returned to Hawaii for health reasons later in the year. Liggins and Williams realized that of the roughly 20 missionaries sent during the previous decade, half had left before their arrival, due to fevers (Shanghai being in the delta of the Yangtze River and surrounded by rice fields), and rough conditions. The countryside was ambiguous about foreigners, and smarting from the defeat in the First Opium War. Many were curious about Western ways, but slavery, gambling, alcoholism, and opium addiction had also become problems that some Western merchants fostered (especially near Canton). The Taiping Rebellion (1850-1864) had begun and in 1853 captured Nanjing only 200 miles from Shanghai. Its leader proclaimed himself as the younger brother of Jesus Christ fought the ruling Manchus (whom he portrayed as devils), and also preached about the equality of women, communal ownership, and revitalized ethics.

On October 2, 1857, Liggins and Williams started on a missionary journey of about 12 days toward Suzhou, about 100 miles from Nanjing. Sometimes they preached jointly near temples and their pamphlets and books were well received; at other times the young missionaries (alone or jointly) faced hostile audiences which drove them back into their boat. Liggins suffered health problems as November began, so Williams proceeded alone on the next journey.

Nonetheless, they both traveled (together with their Chinese teacher Mr. Wong whom Nelson had converted) toward Changshu (Dzang Zok), a city of about 100,000 people, about 70 miles northwest of Shanghai in February 1858. They preached, including on Chinese New Year's Day, and confirmed Nelson's suggestion that it might be a good place to establish a mission, and accordingly wrote Boone for permission in May. However, a week after they received accommodation at a temple in February, a police officer advised the priest who sheltered them not to harbor foreign devils. Before they returned in June, Britain's gunboat diplomacy had led to the Treaty of Tientsin. While Changshu's mayor was interested in their preaching (and became their new landlord), and many others also wanted the missionaries to stay, other Mandarin officials opposed them.

On April 5, 1859, Liggins was in Changshu during a festival known for the disorder (which they had avoided the previous year), thinking locals had accepted them. A mob broke into their house, beat him, and stole many items. Williams arrived five days later and took his incapacitated friend back to Shanghai for medical treatment. A medical missionary who had recently returned from Nagasaki, Japan (recently opening to Westerners after less-martial American gunboat diplomacy, a visit from Syle, and appointment of active Episcopalian Townsend Harris as first American consul in 1856) recommended that Liggins go there to recover and teach English.

== Missionary in Japan ==
Liggins arrived in the port of Nagasaki on May 2, 1859, two months before the official opening of the foreign settlement. By month-end, he received a letter from the Foreign Missions Committee in New York officially sending him and Williams to Japan, as he later noted in the Spirit of Mission. Liggins thus became the first recorded Protestant missionary to arrive in Japan after the country ended over two centuries of self-imposed isolation. Williams arrived in Nagasaki on June 29. Liggins (and later Williams) was initially housed at Kotokuin within Shofukuji Temple since the official foreign settlement was not yet ready.

Liggins immediately began teaching English to Japanese interpreters. However, the new Nagasaki bugyo, in line with centuries of official government policy, forbade him to teach Christianity. His religious duties (and later Williams') were thus mainly limited to ministering to American and British residents of the foreign settlement and visiting sailors. Religious texts could not be openly distributed, but the sale of academic publications afforded Liggins and Williams some engagement with eager Japanese purchasers on matters relating to Christian teaching. While in Nagasaki, Liggins prepared a book entitled One Thousand Familiar Phrases in English and Japanese, one of the first books of its kind published in Japan.

However, a cholera epidemic struck fast-growing Nagasaki by September. In October 1859 Presbyterian missionaries Dr. and Mrs. James Curtis Hepburn also arrived in Nagasaki from Shanghai, but chose to continue by boat, eventually settling in Kanagawa. Liggins' health problems returned, so on February 24, 1860, he set sail from Nagasaki for the United States. Liggins never again set foot in Japan, although he only resigned from his missionary post in 1869 due to continued ill health.

== Later years and death ==
Returning to America, Liggins wrote, spoke and campaigned for the Temperance movement. He and Mary Liggins (either 1 or 2 years his senior) were recorded in New York City in the 1870 census and South Orange, Essex County, New Jersey in the 1880 census. At some point he became a naturalized American citizen. Liggins retired to Cape May, New Jersey where he spent the remaining years of his life, and was recorded in the 1900 and 1910 census as a bachelor living in a boarding house. He was a regular contributor to the letters page of the New York Times, such as his letter defending New York bishop Henry C. Potter (son of bishop Alonzo Potter who had confirmed him), who though abstaining from alcohol, recognized that the saloon had become a poor man's clubhouse because temperance societies did not provide attractive places where intoxicating drinks were not sold. Among Liggins' published works were: England's Opium Policy, A Missionary Picture Galler, and The Great Value and Success of Foreign Missions.

Liggins died on January 8, 1912, in Ocean City, New Jersey (a stronghold of the temperance movement). His will was admitted to probate in Cape May County, New Jersey on August 17, 1911
