= Channing Moore Williams =

American missionary

The Right Reverend Channing Moore Williams
- Missionary Bishop of China and Japan
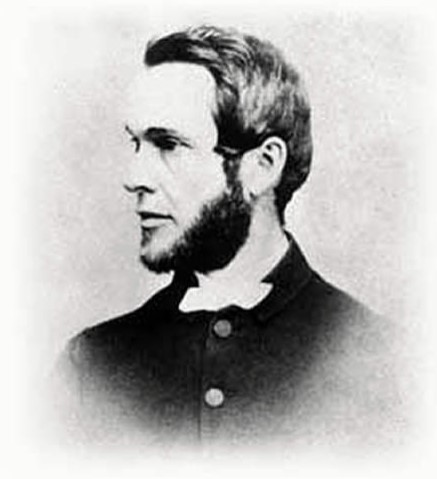
- Williams in 1874
- Church: Episcopal Church
- In office: 1866 to 1889

Orders
- Ordination: July 1, 1855 (deacon) by William Meade; January 11, 1857 (priest) by William Jones Boone
- Consecration: October 3, 1866 by John Henry Hopkins

Personal details
- Born: July 18, 1829 Richmond, Virginia, United States
- Died: December 2, 1910 (aged 81) Richmond, Virginia, United States
- Denomination: Anglicanism
- Parents: John Williams

Sainthood
- Feast day: December 2
- Venerated in: Anglicanism

Channing Moore Williams (July 17, 1829 – December 2, 1910) was an Episcopal Church missionary, later bishop, in China and Japan. Williams was a leading figure in the establishment of the Anglican Church in Japan. His commemoration in some Anglican liturgical calendars is on 2 December.

== Early life and education ==
Channing Williams was born in Richmond, Virginia, the fifth child of lawyer and delegate John Green Williams and his wife Mary Anne Crignan. His father served on the vestry of Monumental Church and led its Sunday school. Channing's first and middle names reflected Virginia's second bishop, Richard Channing Moore, who also served as Monumental Church's rector due to the Episcopal Church's financial straits in Virginia after the Revolutionary War and disestablishment. John Williams died when Channing was three years old, so the devout Mary Williams raised her four sons and two daughters rather than marry again.

When Channing turned 18, he went to Henderson, Kentucky, to work in his cousin Alex B. Barrett's general store, as well as save money for future studies. There, he was confirmed by Benjamin Bosworth Smith, Kentucky's first bishop, on 7 April 1849, and also studied Greek at night under the guidance of the rector of St. Paul's Church. Then, like his eldest sibling John (1823-1870, who became a long-serving rector at St. Peter's Church in Rome, Georgia), Channing attended the College of William and Mary in Williamsburg, Virginia. He graduated with a master of arts degree in 1852, then attended the Virginia Theological Seminary in Alexandria, Virginia.

At VTS, Williams read The Spirit of Missions and other journals. Reports of VTS graduates who wanted to or served as overseas missionaries, including Augustus Lyde, Henry Lockwood and Francis Hanson, inspired him. Williams also heard about VTS graduate William Boone, who a decade earlier had returned to the United States after his wife's death and finally persuaded the Foreign Mission Board to sponsor his work in China. In 1844, the General Convention elected Boone Bishop for China (after the Opium War and 1842 treaty opened Shanghai to foreign missionaries) and he and three recent VTS graduates sailed to China (arriving in June 1845). In 1851, Boone accepted another two recent graduates.

== Early missionary life ==
Bishop William Meade ordained Williams as a deacon at St. Paul's Church Alexandria on 1 July 1855, along with John Liggins and other graduating classmates. Williams served briefly at that church, but he and Liggins also traveled to New York for interviews with the Foreign Missions Board. By November, the aspiring missionaries sailed toward Shanghai, China to join Boone. They reached their destination almost eight months later, on 28 June 1856, having sailed around South America, and with stops at Rio de Janeiro and Sydney, Australia.

At Shanghai, the new missionaries first needed to learn the local Wu dialect, as well as Mandarin and the literary Wen-Li language. They soon learned that of the about twenty missionaries who had traveled to Shanghai to work under Boone since 1845, only about half remained—many experienced health problems, as well as the strains of cultural adjustment and physical dangers. Soon, they were able to substitute for the British chaplain who assisted foreign sailors, and by December Williams could read prayers in Chinese well enough to substitute for the bishop. Boone ordained both Williams and Liggins to the priesthood on 11 January 1857. They soon began making missionary journeys to various cities in the Yangtze River delta from their Shanghai base.

== Missionary work in Japan ==
Meanwhile, in 1856, three years after Commodore Matthew Perry's four-warship entry into Edo Bay, Townsend Harris (a devout Episcopalian) had become the first American consul in Japan. Two years later the senior missionary to China, the Rev. Edward Syle (and three chaplains of other denominations), had accompanied W. B. Reed (the U.S. ambassador to China) on his voyage to Nagasaki. In 1859, together with his fellow VTS graduate the Rev. John Liggins (a British-born missionary who had suffered a severe beating from an anti-foreign mob in Changshu in April, as well as repeated fevers and had been sent to Nagasaki to recover), Williams was assigned by the Foreign Mission Board to begin missionary work in Japan. Williams arrived in Nagasaki (joining Rev. Liggins) on June 26, 1859.

Due to longstanding government restrictions on the teaching of Christianity (since the arrival of Jesuit missionaries in the 16th century) and the need to learn Japanese, Liggins' and Williams' religious duties were initially limited to ministering to American and British residents of the Nagasaki foreign settlement, as well as to visiting sailors. However, they could also serve as interpreters, as well as teach English. Rev. Liggins compiled a Japanese-English phrasebook before ill-health forced his departure in February 1860. A medical missionary, Ernest Schmid, arrived, but ill-health also forced his departure; and a missionary teacher, Jeanette Conover, also returned to Shanghai due to Japanese anti-foreigner sentiment in 1863. The American Civil War also complicated matters; by 1864, Williams and a Dutch Reformed pastor were the only Protestant missionaries remaining in Japan. Williams continued his limited duties and began translating the gospels. His first recorded baptism of a Japanese convert, a Kumamoto samurai named Shōmura Sukeuemon, was not until February 1866.

Boone died in 1864, and the first postwar General Convention elected Williams as his successor. He sailed for the U.S., and on October 3, 1866, during a meeting of the Board of Missions in New York City, Williams was consecrated as Missionary Bishop of China and Japan at St. John's Chapel. Presiding Bishop Hopkins led the consecration, joined by Bishops Lee, Johns, Payne, Potter, Whipple and Talbot. Williams remained in the United States that winter, traveling to both northern and southern cities to tell American clergy and people about the missionary fields in China and Japan.

Williams returned initially to China, but in 1868 returned to Japan, since he had learned the language and no other Protestant missionaries volunteered for that duty. Although numerous Catholic missionaries continued, the government banished 4000 Japanese Catholic converts to Yezzo island (later renamed Hokkaido) in 1869. Williams settled at Osaka (a 30-hour sail from China) in 1869, and the following spring baptized four more converts. Meanwhile, Americans tried diplomatic channels to legalize Christian missionary work. In 1869 two outposts had been established: by the Church Missionary Society in Nagasaki, and the American Mission Board at Yokohama. He visited China in a yearly basis after settling in Tokyo. In May, 1871, Williams finally received assistance, as the Rev. Arthur Morris of New Jersey arrived in Osaka and began learning the language; he progressed enough to open a boys' school the following fall. Also, the Japanese government finally repealed its anti-Christian law in 1872, and allowed banished Christians to return to their villages.

In December 1873, Williams relocated to Tsukiji in Tokyo and was made Bishop of Edo. In February 1874 he founded a private school there, St. Paul's School, which ultimately became Rikkyo University.

In 1887, in partnership with Bishop Edward Bickersteth, Williams worked to unite the various national Anglican missionary efforts into the Nippon Sei Ko Kai, (i.e. the "Holy Catholic Church"), the Anglican church in Japan. He presided over the first Synod of the Anglican Church in Japan in 1887, where these discussions occurred not only with the foreign missionaries, also with even more Japanese clergy and lay people.

Williams stepped down two years later to make way for a younger generation of missionaries. The General Convention chose Bishop John McKim as his successor, and he returned to New York for consecration in 1893. Williams remained in Japan, moving to Kyoto to evangelize in the Kansai region.

== Death and legacy ==
Williams returned to America in failing health in 1908, two years before his death in Richmond in 1910. He is buried with his family at Hollywood Cemetery.
