= List of foreign recipients of the Order of the Chrysanthemum =

The Order of the Chrysanthemum is the highest Japanese order, and comprises two classes, the Collar and the Grand Cordon. It may also be conferred upon select foreign recipients as a diplomatic courtesy; since World War II, the Collar is typically conferred upon foreign sovereign monarchs, while the Grand Cordon is conferred upon certain members of foreign royal families along with select elected foreign heads of state.

== Collar ==
=== Afghanistan ===
- Mohammad Zahir Shah, King of Afghanistan (8 April 1969)

=== Belgium ===
- Baudouin, King of the Belgians (14 January 1964)
- Albert II, King of the Belgians (11 October 1996)
- Philippe, King of the Belgians (4 October 2016) (Note: Previously conferred with the Grand Cordon on 26 May 1994.)

=== Brazil ===
- Ernesto Geisel, President of Brazil (10 September 1976)

=== Brunei ===
- Hassanal Bolkiah, Sultan of Brunei (3 April 1984)

=== Cambodia ===
- Norodom Sihamoni, King of Cambodia (11 May 2010)

=== Denmark ===
- Margrethe II, Queen of Denmark (17 April 1981)

=== Ethiopian Empire ===
- Haile Selassie I, Emperor of Ethiopia (16 November 1956)

=== Iran ===
- Mohammad Reza Pahlavi, Shah of Iran (19 May 1958)

=== Kingdom of Iraq ===
- Faisal II, King of Iraq (8 November 1957)

=== Jordan ===
- Hussein, King of Jordan (2 March 1976)
- Abdullah II, King of Jordan (26 November 1999)

=== Luxembourg ===
- Jean, Grand Duke of Luxembourg (6 February 1998)
- Henri, Grand Duke of Luxembourg (21 November 2017)

=== Malaysia ===
- Putra, King of Malaysia (15 June 1964)
- Ismail Nasiruddin, King of Malaysia (17 February 1970)
- Azlan Shah, King of Malaysia (20 September 1991)
- Abdul Halim, King of Malaysia (25 September 2012)

=== Morocco ===
- Mohammed VI, King of Morocco (22 November 2005) (Note: Previously conferred with the Grand Cordon as Crown Prince in 1987.)

=== Kingdom of Nepal ===
- Mahendra, King of Nepal (15 April 1960)
- Birendra, King of Nepal (12 February 1975)

=== Netherlands ===
- Beatrix, Queen of the Netherlands (17 October 1991)
- Willem-Alexander, King of the Netherlands (24 October 2014)

=== Norway ===
- Olav V, King of Norway (14 October 1983)
- Harald V, King of Norway (16 March 2001)

=== Saudi Arabia ===
- Faisal, King of Saudi Arabia (18 May 1971)
- Salman bin Abdulaziz Al Saud, King of Saudi Arabia (10 March 2017)

=== Spain ===
- Alfonso XIII, King of Spain (November 1930)
- Juan Carlos I, King of Spain (24 October 1980)
- Felipe VI, King of Spain (31 March 2017)

=== Thailand ===
- Bhumibol Adulyadej, King of Thailand (24 May 1963)

=== United Kingdom ===
- Edward VII, King of the United Kingdom and Emperor of India (13 April 1902) (Note: Invested during the visit of Prince Komatsu Akihito to the UK in June 1902 to attend his coronation. Appointed Grand Cordon of the Order as Prince of Wales on 20 September 1886 and invested by Prince Komatsu 7 December 1886, becoming the first British recipient of the order.)
- George V, King of the United Kingdom and Emperor of India (1911) (Note: Invested by Prince Higashifushimi Yorihito.)
- Prince Arthur, Duke of Connaught and Strathearn (13 September 1912) (Note: While attending the funeral of the Meiji Emperor. Had previously been conferred with the Grand Cordon in May 1890 by the Meiji Emperor.)
- Prince Henry, Duke of Gloucester (4 May 1929) (Note: Invested by the Shōwa Emperor as a reciprocal honour in return for investing the Emperor with the Order of the Garter. Had previously been conferred with the Grand Cordon in 1921.)
- George VI, King of the United Kingdom and Emperor of India (1937)
- Elizabeth II, Queen of the United Kingdom (10 July 1962)
- Charles III, King of the United Kingdom (14 June 2024) (Note: Previously conferred with the Grand Cordon as Prince of Wales on 5 October 1971.)

=== United States ===
- Dwight D. Eisenhower, President of the United States (8 September 1960)

== Grand Cordon ==
=== Argentina ===
- Juan Perón, President of Argentina (19 October 1954)
- Mauricio Macri, President of Argentina, 2017

=== Belgium ===
- Princess Elisabeth, Duchess of Brabant (23 June 2026)

=== Czechoslovakia ===
- Tomáš Masaryk, President of Czechoslovakia, 1928

=== Denmark ===
- Prince Joachim of Denmark, 2011
- Frederik X, King of Denmark, 2024

=== France ===
- François Hollande, President of France, 2013

=== Finland ===
- Risto Ryti, President of Finland (3 December 1942)
- Mauno Koivisto, President of Finland (30 September 1986)
- Tarja Halonen, President of Finland

=== German Empire ===
- Wilhelm I, German Emperor (January 1887)
- Prince Henry of Prussia (10 September 1912)

=== Kingdom of Hawaii ===
- David Kalākaua, King of Hawaii (14 March 1881)

=== Kingdom of Italy ===
- Benito Mussolini, Duce and Prime Minister of Italy (24 August 1938)

=== Kazakhstan ===
- Nursultan Nazarbayev, President of Kazakhstan, 2009

=== Lithuania ===
- Valdas Adamkus, President of Lithuania

=== Mexico ===
- Álvaro Obregón, President of Mexico (November 1924)

=== Kingdom of Montenegro ===
- Nikola I, King of Montenegro (11 January 1884)

=== Netherlands ===
- Catharina-Amalia, Princess of Orange (17 June 2026)

=== Ottoman Empire ===
- Abdul Hamid II, Sultan of the Ottoman Empire (October 1887)

=== Pakistan ===
- Muhammad Ayub Khan, President of Pakistan (1959, reportedly)

=== Philippines ===
- Ferdinand Marcos, President of the Philippines (1966)
- Corazon C. Aquino, President of the Philippines
- Gloria Macapagal-Arroyo, President of the Philippines
- Benigno Aquino III, President of the Philippines (29 May 2015)
- Bongbong Marcos, President of the Philippines (2026)

=== Poland ===
- Aleksander Kwaśniewski, President of Poland

=== Kingdom of Romania ===
- Crown Prince Carol of Romania (24 June 1920)

=== Russian Empire ===
- Alexander III of Russia (20 May 1880)

=== Spain ===
- Infante Alfonso, Duke of Galliera (13 September 1912) (Note: While attending the funeral of the Meiji Emperor.)

=== Sweden ===
- Victoria, Crown Princess of Sweden
- Prince Carl Philip, Duke of Värmland

=== Thailand ===
- Chulalongkorn, King of Siam (6 October 1887)
- Prajadhipok, King of Siam (April 1931)
- Maha Vajiralongkorn, King of Thailand (1991)

=== United Kingdom ===
- Prince Arthur of Connaught (20 February 1906) (Note: Invested by the Meiji Emperor as a reciprocal honour in return for investing the Emperor with the Order of the Garter.)

=== United States ===
- Ronald Reagan, President of the United States (23 October 1989)

=== Yugoslavia ===
- Josip Broz Tito, President of Yugoslavia (April 1968)
