= Japanese students in the United Kingdom =

The first Japanese students in the United Kingdom arrived in the nineteenth century, sent to study at University College London by the Chōshū and Satsuma domains, then the Bakufu (Shogunate). Many went on to study at Cambridge University and a smaller number at Oxford University until the end of the Meiji period. The primary motive for this was an effort to modernise Japan in the long run. Since the 1980s, Japanese students in the United Kingdom have become common thanks to cheaper air travel.

== Chōshū Five (1863) ==
At University College London supervised by Professor Alexander William Williamson

- Itō Shunsuke (later Itō Hirobumi) – Genrō, 1st, 5th, 7th, and 10th Prime Minister of Japan
- Inoue Monta (later Inoue Kaoru) – Genrō, Minister of Foreign Affairs, Agriculture and Commerce, Home, and Treasury
- Nomura Yakichi (later Inoue Masaru) – 1st Director of Railways (Tetsudō-chō)
- Endō Kinsuke – Head of Japan Mint (Zōheikyoku)
- Yamao Yōzō – Minister of Industry, Director of Cabinet Legislation Bureau

== Satsuma students (1865) ==
15 Satsuma students, one from Tosa and one from Nagasaki, and 4 supervisors (ometsuke). This group also studied at University College London which was open to students of all religions.

- Niiro Hisanobu(Niiro Chuzō) - Leader of Students, Karō of Satsuma-Han
- Matsuki Kōan (later Terashima Munenori) - Minister of Foreign Affairs, and Minister of Education
- Godai Tomoatsu (Godai Saisuke) - Founder of Osaka Chamber of Commerce and Industry and Osaka Securities Exchange
- Mori Arinori - 1st Minister of Education, Founder of Hitotsubashi University
- Machida Hisanari - Ōmetsuke of Satsuma-Han, 1st Curator of Imperial Museum of Japan (later Tokyo National Museum)
  - Machida Shinsirō - brother of Machida Hisanari
  - Machida Seizō (later Takarabe Saneyuki) - brother of Machida Hisanari
- Hatakeyaka Hatanosuke (later Hatakeyama Yoshinari) - head of Kaisei Gakkō (開成学校, one of predecessor of University of Tokyo), member of Iwakura Mission
- Murahashi Hisanari - founder of brewery of Kaitakushi (Hokkaido Development Commission), later Sapporo Brewery
- Asakura Moriaki (later Asakura Moriaki) redeveloper of Ikuno Silver Mine
- Sameshima Naonobu - Envoy to France
- Matsumura Junzō - Vice Admiral of Imperial Japanese Navy, Director of Imperial Japanese Naval Academy
- Takami Yaichi (former Ōishi Danzō) formerly rōnin of Tosa-Han, assassin of Yoshida Tōyō
- Yoshida Kiyonari - Envoy to USA
- Isonaga Hirosuke (later Nagasawa Kanaye) - winemaker of Fountain Grove Winery in California
- Nakamura Hironari (or Nakamura Hakuai) - Ministry to Belgium, member of House of Peers
- Hori Takayuki - Interpreter of Dutch language in Nagasaki
- Nagoya Tokinari
- Togo Ainoshin - died in Boshin War

== Bakufu students (1866) ==
Supervisors:

- Kawaji Taro
- Nakamura Keisuke

Students: (12)

- Naruse Jogoro
- Toyama Sutehachi,
- Mitsukuri Keigo
- Fukuzawa Einosuke (no relation of Fukuzawa Yukichi)
- Hayashi Tozaburo (later Hayashi Tadasu)
- Ito Shonosuke
- Okukawa Ichiro
- Yasui Shinpachiro
- Mitsukuri Dairoku (later Kikuchi Dairoku)
- Ichikawa Morisaburo
- Sugi Tokujiro
- Iwasa Genji

== Students in the Meiji era ==
=== Cambridge University ===
- Kikuchi Dairoku
- Suematsu Kenchō
- Inagaki Manjirō
- Okura Kishichiro
- Tanaka Ginnosuke

=== Oxford University ===
- Yasuhito, Prince Chichibu
- Hachisuka Mochiaki
- Nanjo Bunyu - professor of Sanskrit at Tokyo University
- Takakusu Junjiro

=== Naval trainees ===
- Prince Arisugawa Takehito
- Prince Higashifushimi Yorihito
- Tōgō Heihachirō
- Yuzuru Hiraga

=== Other ===
- Hayashi Tadasu
- Takamine Jōkichi

== After World War II ==
- Naruhito, Emperor of Japan, Oxford
- Masako, Empress of Japan, Oxford
- Aiko, Princess Toshi, Eton
- Fumihito, Crown Prince of Japan, Oxford
- Mako Komuro, University of Edinburgh, University of Leicester
- Princess Kako of Akishino, University of Leeds
- Prince Tomohito of Mikasa, Oxford
- Princess Tomohito of Mikasa, Rosslyn College
- Princess Akiko of Mikasa, Oxford
- Hisako, Princess Takamado, Cambridge
- Princess Tsuguko of Takamado, University of Edinburgh
- Katsuhiko Oku, Oxford
- Hisashi Owada, Cambridge

== See also ==
- Rikkyo School in England
- Teikyo School United Kingdom
- Teikyo University of Japan in Durham
- Gyosei International School UK (closed)
- Gyosei International College in the U.K. (closed)
- Japanese community in the United Kingdom
- Japan–United Kingdom relations
