= Marunouchi Central Plaza =

Plaza in Tokyo, Japan

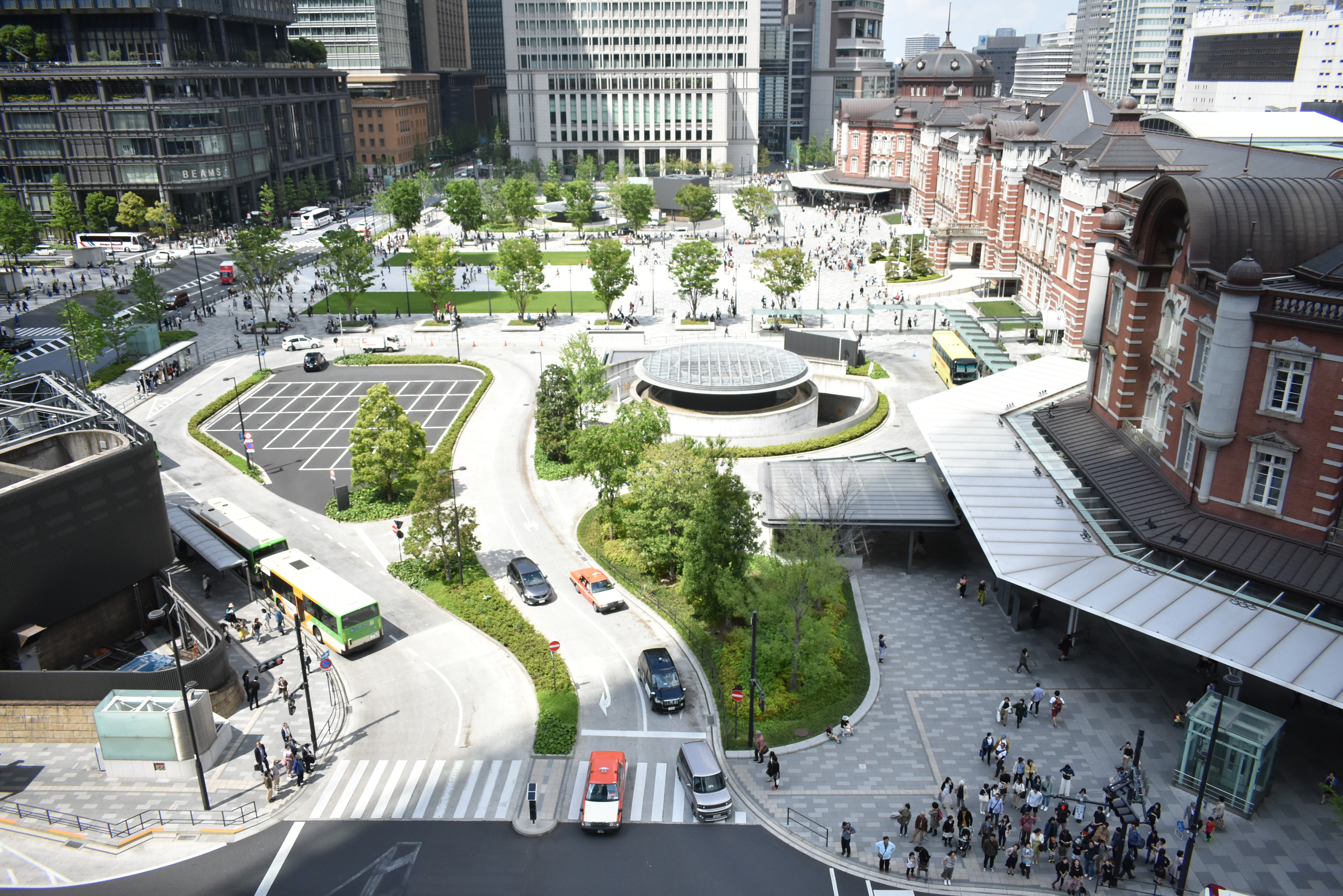
- The plaza in 2019
- Type: Plaza
- Area: 6,500 square meter
- Location: Tokyo, Japan

Construction
- Construction start: August 2014
- Inauguration: December 2017

Marunouchi Central Plaza, or Tokyo Marunouchi Station Plaza, is a plaza on the Marunouchi side of Tokyo Station, in Tokyo, Japan. Construction on the plaza began in August 2014. It was unveiled in December 2017. The 6,500 square meter plaza is paved with white granite and partly lined with Japanese zelkova trees.

A statue of Inoue Masaru is installed in the plaza.
