= Chōshū Five =

5 students from Japan who travelled to University College London

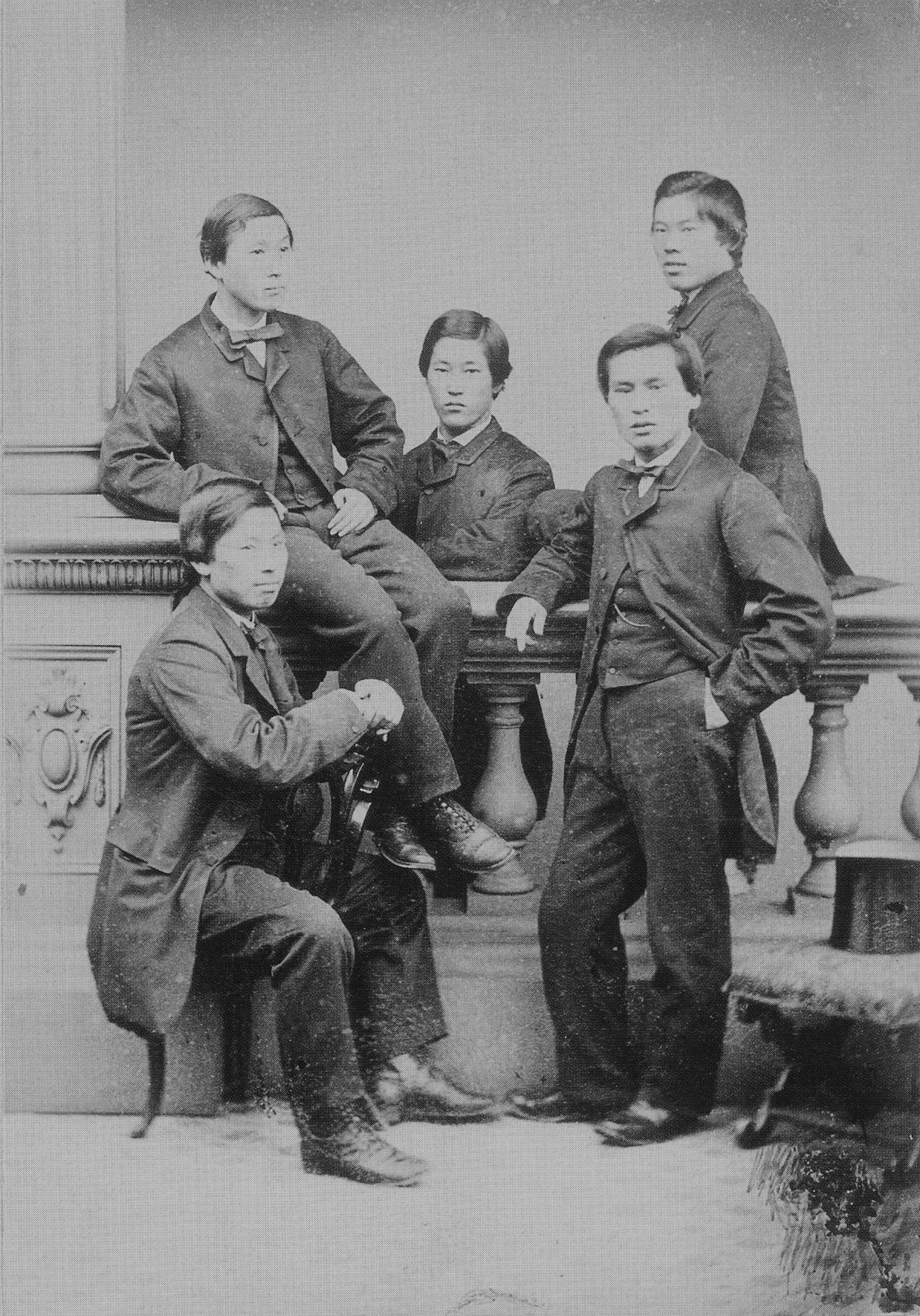
Clockwise from top left: Endō Kinsuke, Nomura Yakichi, Itō Shunsuke, Yamao Yōzō, and Inoue Monta, photographed in 1863

The Chōshū Five (長州五傑, Chōshū Goketsu) were members of the Chōshū han of western Japan who travelled to England in 1863 to study at University College London. The five students were the first of many successive groups of Japanese students who travelled overseas in the late Bakumatsu and early Meiji eras. All five students later rose to prominent positions in Japanese political and civil life.

== Background and participants ==
The Chōshū han, based in what is now known as Yamaguchi Prefecture, was eager to acquire better knowledge of the western nations and gain access to military technology in order to strengthen the domain in its struggle to overthrow the Tokugawa shogunate. The decision by Chōshū han elders to sponsor five promising students to study overseas came in the midst of growing domestic political tensions and in the wake of reports from the First Japanese Embassy to Europe that had returned in January 1863.

Notably, two of the students chosen, Ito Shunsuke and Inoue Monta, were students of the intellectual Yoshida Shōin—who was previously imprisoned by the domain authorities, then executed by the Shogunate in 1859 for attempting to communicate with U.S. Commodore Matthew C. Perry (as well as launching an abortive revolt against Ii Naosuke). This shift in policy coincided with the rise of their fellow students of Yoshida in Chōshū han administration (Katsura Kogoro and Takasugi Shinsaku—leader of the anti-Bakufu Kiheitai, respectively).

At the time of the students’ departure it was still illegal to leave Japan and travel overseas due to the shogunate's maritime seclusion policy (sakoku or, as it was known at the time, kaikin). If they had been caught, they likely would have been put to death. This policy was only finally abolished in 1866. The students were aware of the risks and wrote to the governing council of their domain to say that if they failed with their intention they "had not the slightest intention of coming back alive".

Name	Image	Note
Itō Shunsuke 伊藤 博文 (1841 - 1909)	Portrait of Itō Shunsuke	Later named Itō Hirobumi. First Prime Minister of Japan
Inoue Monta 井上 馨 (1836 - 1915)	Portrait of Inoue Monta	Later named Inoue Kaoru. Minister of Foreign Affairs
Yamao Yōzō 山尾 庸三 (1837 - 1917)	Portrait of Yamao Yōzō	Later created the Ministry of Public Works
Endō Kinsuke 遠藤 謹助 (1836 - 1893)	Portrait of Endō Kinsuke	Later served as the head of the National Mint in Osaka
Nomura Yakichi 野村弥吉 (1843 - 1910)	Portrait of Nomura Yakichi	Later named Inoue Masaru. Known as the 'Father of Japanese Railways'.

== Voyage to Britain ==
With the support of Nagasaki-based trader Thomas Blake Glover, arrangements were made through his local agent, a Mr. Weigal, to secure passage for the five students on one of the many British trading ships calling at the port of Yokohama. Disguised as English sailors, the Chōshū students were put aboard the Jardine, Matheson & Co. vessel Chelswick for 1000 ryō each with the reluctant agreement of the ship's captain, J. S. Gower. In order to pay for the voyage, Inoue had to borrow 5,000 ryō from the Chōshū han. Before leaving Japan, the Chōshū students had to cut off their topknots, remove their swords, and change into Western clothes given to them by J. S. Gower. The five departed Yokohama on the 27 June 1863, bound for Shanghai where they were sheltered on an opium storage ship before dividing into two groups for the extended voyage around the Cape of Good Hope to London.

While Inoue Masaru, Yamao Yōzō and Endō Kinsuke travelled to Europe as passengers on the 915 ton three-masted tea clipper Whiteadder, Inoue Kaoru and Itō Hirobumi, destined to be two of the greatest Japanese statesmen of the age, were mistakenly assumed to be eager to earn their passage as crew and were put to work as deckhands on a grueling 130 day journey aboard the 525 ton sailing ship Pegasus.

== Studies in Britain ==
Pegasus reached London on 4 November 1863, Whiteadder arriving three days later on the 7th. The reunited Chōshū students were introduced by Hugh Matheson, senior partner of Matheson and Company to Dr. Alexander Williamson, FRS, Professor of Chemistry at University College, London. Itō Hirobumi, Endō Kinsuke and Inoue Masaru lodged at the Camden home of Professor Williamson and his family, while Inoue Kaoru and Yamao Yōzō lodged at 103 Gower Street with the Coopers adjacent to the university campus. They all enlisted in University College London, and studied analytical chemistry under the tutorship of Professor Williamson. Between classes, the five students visited places in London such as the Royal Mint, museums, art galleries, shipbuilding yards, factories and the Bank of England.

Inoue Kaoru and Itō Hirobumi returned after only six months in early April 1864 when they received news via Jardine Matheson's London representatives that the Chōshū clan was engaged in direct conflict with Western allied powers over control of the strategic Straits of Shimonoseki. Endo also returned in the later half of 1866 for health reasons. In August 1865, Yamao moved to Glasgow to study the shipyards. He worked at Napier’s Shipyard on the Clyde by day, and studied at Anderson’s College at night. He returned to Japan in 1868, the same year that the final member of the Choshū Five, Inoue, went back.

== 150th anniversary celebrations ==
2013 was the 150th anniversary of the Chōshū Five departing Japan to commence studies at University College London (UCL). There were several commemorative events held in both Japan and the United Kingdom to mark this event. In July, there was a celebration hosted by UCL at the main campus with participation from representatives of the Japan embassy in London.

== Visit 150 years later by Japan's Prime Minister ==
On 1 May 2014 Japan's Prime Minister Shinzō Abe paid a courtesy visit to UCL and the monument of the Chōshū Five there.

== See also ==
- Japanese students in the United Kingdom
- Japan–United Kingdom relations

== Sources ==
- Cobbing, Andrew (2010). “Inoue Kaoru (1836–1915): A Controversial Meiji Statesman”. in Biographical Portraits. Leiden: BRILL.
