= Masaru Inoue =

Masaru Inoue may refer to:

- Masaru Inoue (astronomer), an astronomer
- Inoue Masaru (bureaucrat) (1843–1910), Japanese engineer and bureaucrat, "Father of Japan's Railways"
