= Gyosei International School =

School in Chiba Prefecture, Japan

- 暁星国際学園
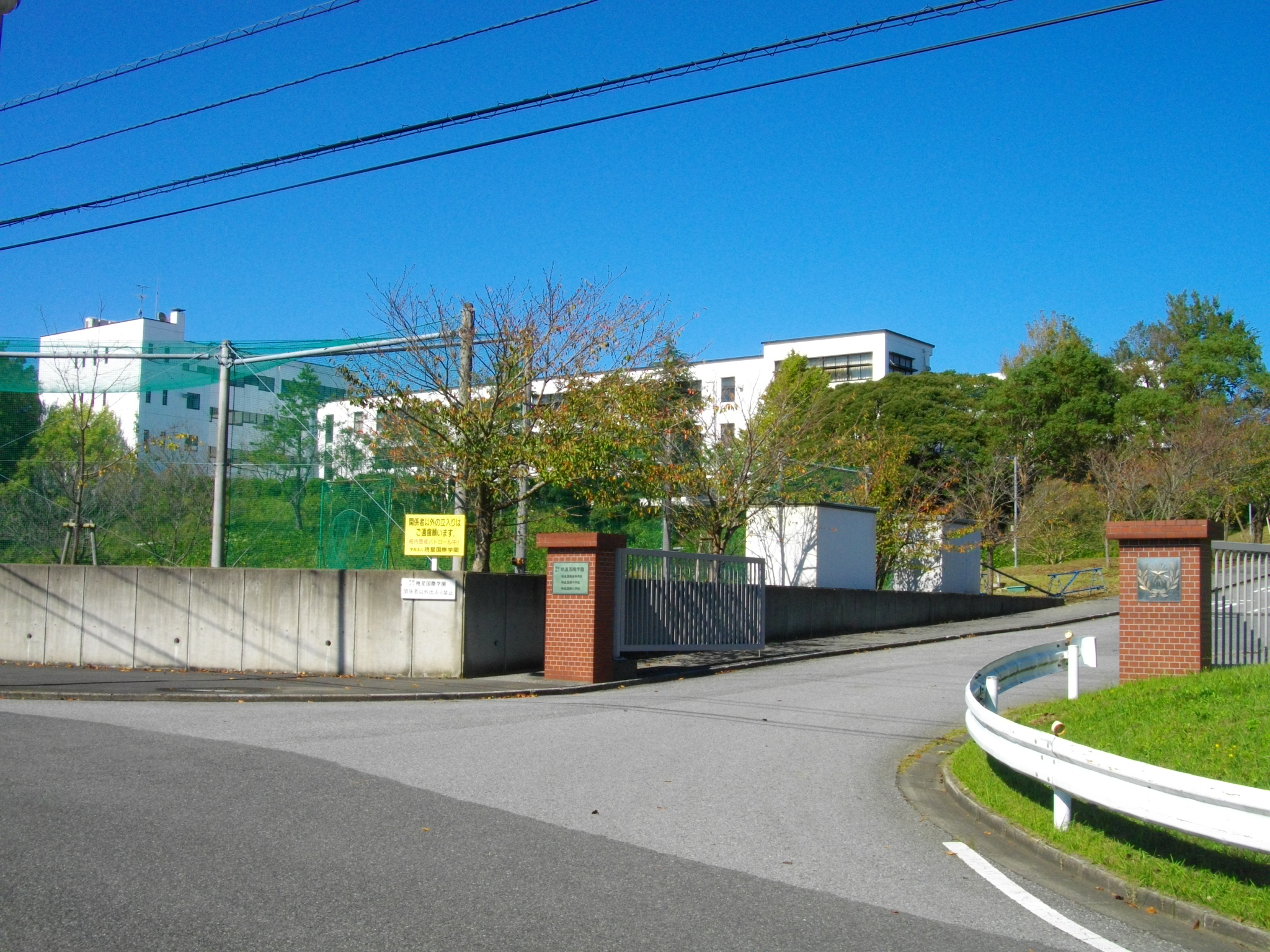

Location
- Yana, Kisarazu, Chiba
- 35.348403°N 139.988469°E

Information
- School type: Primary school, Middle school, High school
- Religious affiliation: Roman Catholic Church
- Established: 1979
- Founder: Fr. Shigeru D. Tagawa
- Principal: Fr. Shigeru D. Tagawa
- Enrolment: Approx 600
- Website: www.gis.ac.jp

The Gyosei International School (暁星国際学園, Gyōsei Kokusai Gakuen) is a school located in Yana, Kisarazu City, Chiba Prefecture, Japan. The principal was Shigeru Tagawa (田川 茂 Tagawa Shigeru) until 2023. As of 1995, it was a Roman Catholic institution, and Tagawa was a member of the clergy.

The main school has two integrated departments, one section conducted predominantly in English, with supplementary French and Japanese instruction, and the other conducted entirely in Japanese. The school is a complete primary and secondary educational system, with six years for elementary, three for junior high, and three for high school.

Parallel to the two departments is the "Yohane" program, which is an experimental school where the students study at their own pace and choose their own courses of study. Teachers for this department are employed as counselors for the students, rather than conducting conventional classes.

== History ==
Gyosei International Senior High School was established in 1979 by those operating Gyosei High School in Kudan, Tokyo. In 1981 the junior high school division opened on a shared site with the high school. In 1984 the two schools were re-established as a separate entity.

== Notable alumni ==
=== Entertainment ===
- Masatoshi Akihara, film director
- Kuro Tanino, theatre director
- Asahi Uchida, actor
- Sakurako Okubo, actress
- Yuuki Yamamoto, model
- Tsubasa Masuwaka, model
- Yuta Takahata, actor
- Luke Hasegawa, artist.

=== Athletes ===
- Ryota Aikawa, baseball player
- Reo Kunimoto, footballer
- Michihiro Ogasawara, baseball player

== See also ==
- Gyosei International School UK (defunct international school in England)
- Gyosei International College in the U.K. (defunct post-secondary college in England)
