= Statue of Inoue Masaru =

Sculpture in Tokyo, Japan

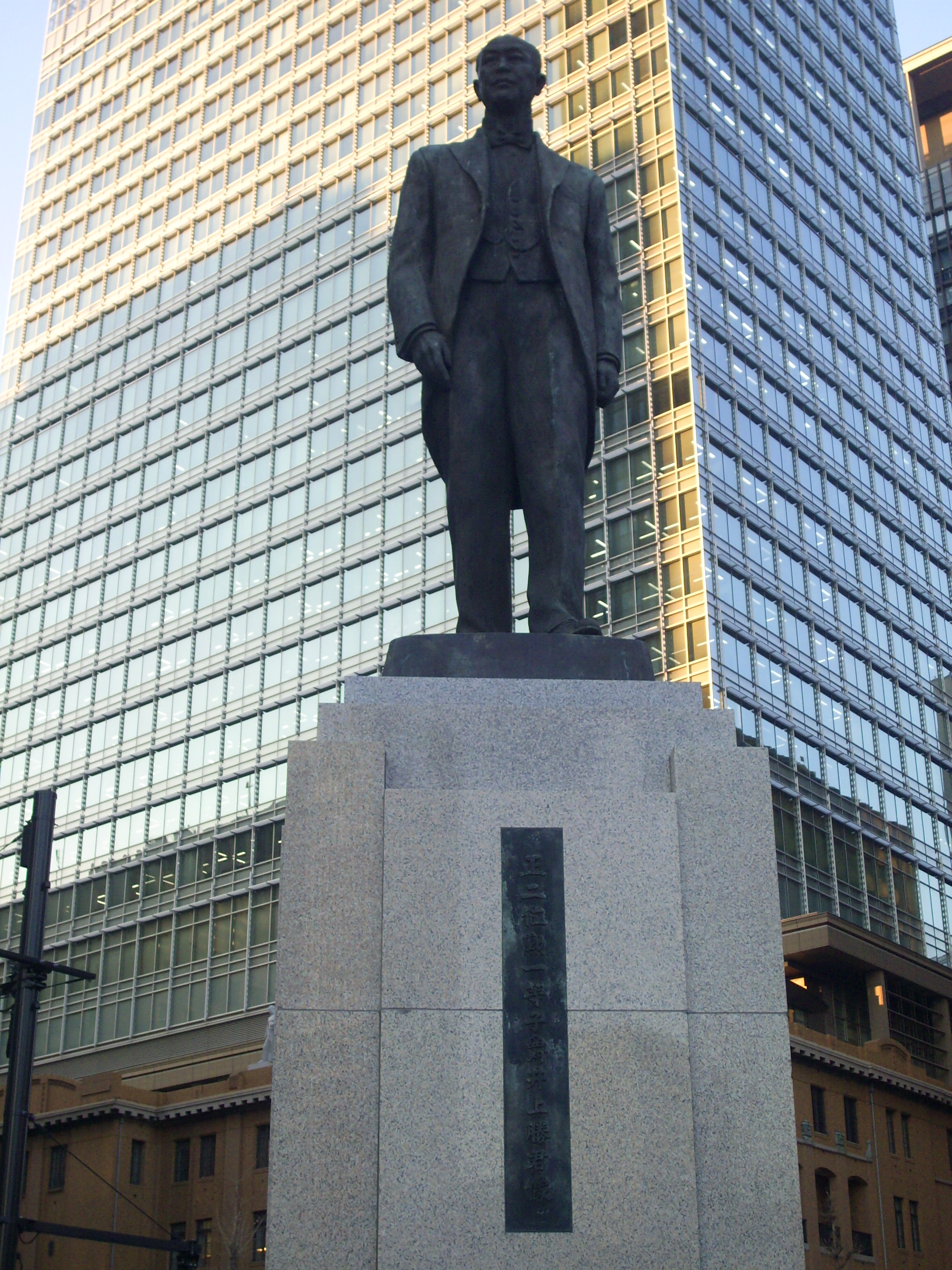
- The statue in 2017
- Subject: Inoue Masaru
- Location: Tokyo, Japan; 35°40′57.4″N 139°45′54.7″E

A statue of Inoue Masaru is installed in Marunouchi Central Plaza, outside Tokyo Station, in Tokyo, Japan.
