= Alexander William Williamson =

English chemist (1824–1904)

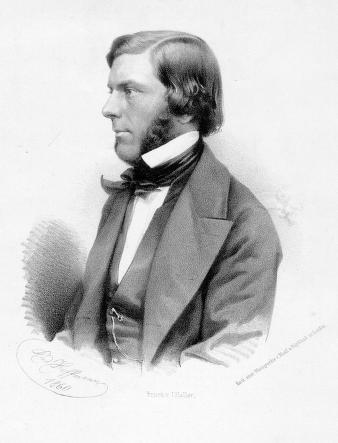
- Alexander William Williamson
- Born: 1 May 1824; Wandsworth, London, England
- Died: 6 May 1904 (aged 80); Hindhead, Surrey, England
- Resting place: Brookwood Cemetery; 51°17′50.6″N 0°37′32.4″W
- Education: University of Giessen
- Known for: Williamson ether synthesis
- Awards: Royal Medal (1862)
- Scientific career
- Fields: Chemistry
- Doctoral advisor: Leopold Gmelin; Justus von Liebig

Alexander William Williamson FRS FRSE PCS MRIA (1 May 1824 – 6 May 1904) was an English chemist. He is best known today for the Williamson ether synthesis.

== Life ==
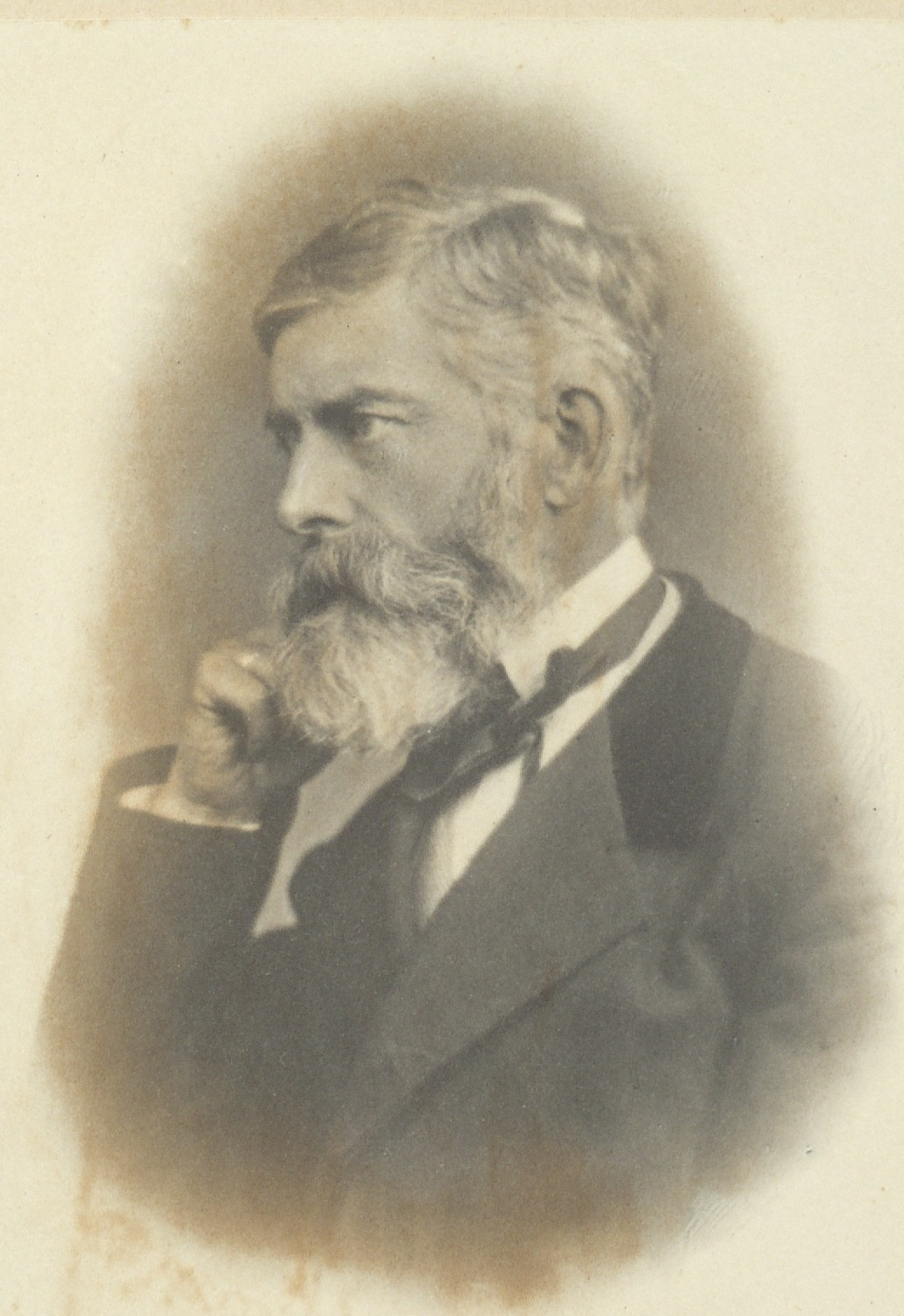
Alexander William Williamson in his late years

Williamson was born on 1 May 1824 in Wandsworth, London, the second of three children of Alexander Williamson (originally from Elgin) a clerk with the East India Company and his wife, Antonia McAndrew, daughter of a prominent London merchant. Despite early physical infirmity, the loss of sight in one eye and a largely useless left arm, Williamson grew up in a caring and stimulating intellectual environment. After an early childhood spent in Brighton and then schools in Kensington, Williams enrolled at the University of Heidelberg in 1841. After working under Leopold Gmelin at Heidelberg, he transferred to the University of Giessen to work with Justus von Liebig, where he received his PhD in 1845. Williamson then spent three years in Paris studying higher mathematics under Auguste Comte.

In 1849, with the support of Thomas Graham, Williamson was appointed professor of analytical and practical chemistry at University College, London. From Graham's resignation in 1855 until Williamson's retirement in 1887, Williamson also held the chair of general (theoretical) chemistry.

As a result of this increase in income, he was able to marry Emma Catherine Key, the third daughter of Thomas Hewitt Key, in 1855. They had two children: Oliver Key (d. 1941) and Alice Maude. Alice Maud Williamson married the physicist Alfred Henry Fison (1857–1923).

Williamson died on 6 May 1904, at High Pitfold, Shottermill near Haslemere in Surrey, England, and was buried at Brookwood Cemetery in Surrey.

== Research on ethers ==
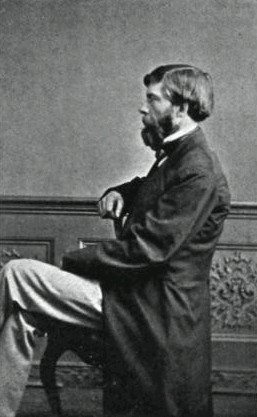
Alexander Williamson

Williamson is credited for his research on the formation of unsymmetrical ethers by the interaction of an alkoxide with a haloalkane, known as the Williamson ether synthesis. He regarded ethers and alcohols as substances analogous to and built up on the same type as water, and he further introduced the water-type as a widely applicable basis for the classification of chemical compounds. The method of stating the rational constitution of bodies by comparison with water he believed capable of wide extension, and that one type, he thought, would suffice for all inorganic compounds, as well as for the best-known organic ones, the formula of water being taken in certain cases as doubled or tripled.

His synthesis of unsymmetrical ethers proved the theory posed by Charles Frédéric Gerhardt and Auguste Laurent that ethers have twice as many carbon atoms as alcohols and not the same amount as argued by Liebig. Similarly, his synthesis of chlorosulfuric acid in 1854 disproved the hypothesis that sulfuric acid is a compound of water (which was assumed to have formula of HO) and sulfur trioxide.

So far back as 1850 he also suggested a view which, in a modified form, is of fundamental importance in the modern theory of ionic dissociation, for, in a paper on the theory of the formation of ether, he urged that in an aggregate of molecules of any compound there is an exchange constantly going on between the elements which are contained in it; for instance, in hydrochloric acid each atom of hydrogen does not remain quietly in juxtaposition with the atom of chlorine with which it first united, but changes places with other atoms of hydrogen. A somewhat similar hypothesis was put forward by Rudolf Clausius about the same time.

== Williamson and the Chōshū Five ==
In 1863 five students from the Chōshū clan were smuggled out of Japan. At the time Japan was still a closed society; the laws of the Tokugawa Shogunate making travel to another country a capital offence. After an arduous journey reaching London, the students were placed under the care of Professor Williamson. He and his wife Catherine welcomed the group into their home, taught them English, introduced them to western society, and arranged for them to study as non-matriculated students at University College London. Itō Shunsuke (later Itō Hirobumi), Endō Kinsuke and Nomura Yakichi (later Inoue Masaru) lived with the Williamsons at their Camden home, while Inoue Monta (later Inoue Kaoru), and Yamao Yōzō lived adjacent to the university in Gower Street.

The Chōshū Five as they later became known all served in the Japanese government, and made significant scientific and social contributions to the modernisation of Japan. Fourteen more international Japanese students, from the Satsuma clan, later worked with Williamson beginning in 1865.

== Honours and awards ==
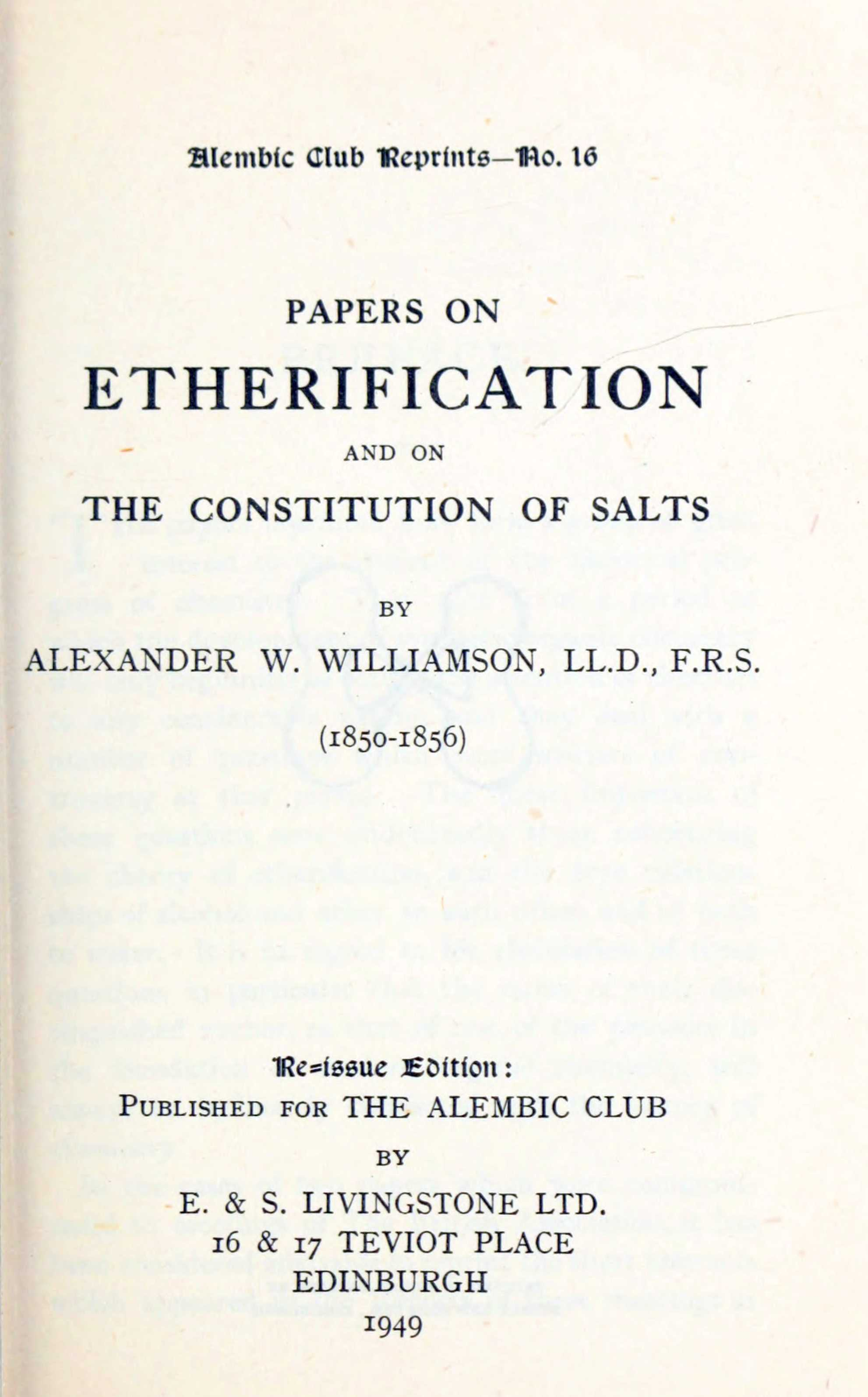
Papers on etherification and on the constitution of salts, 1949

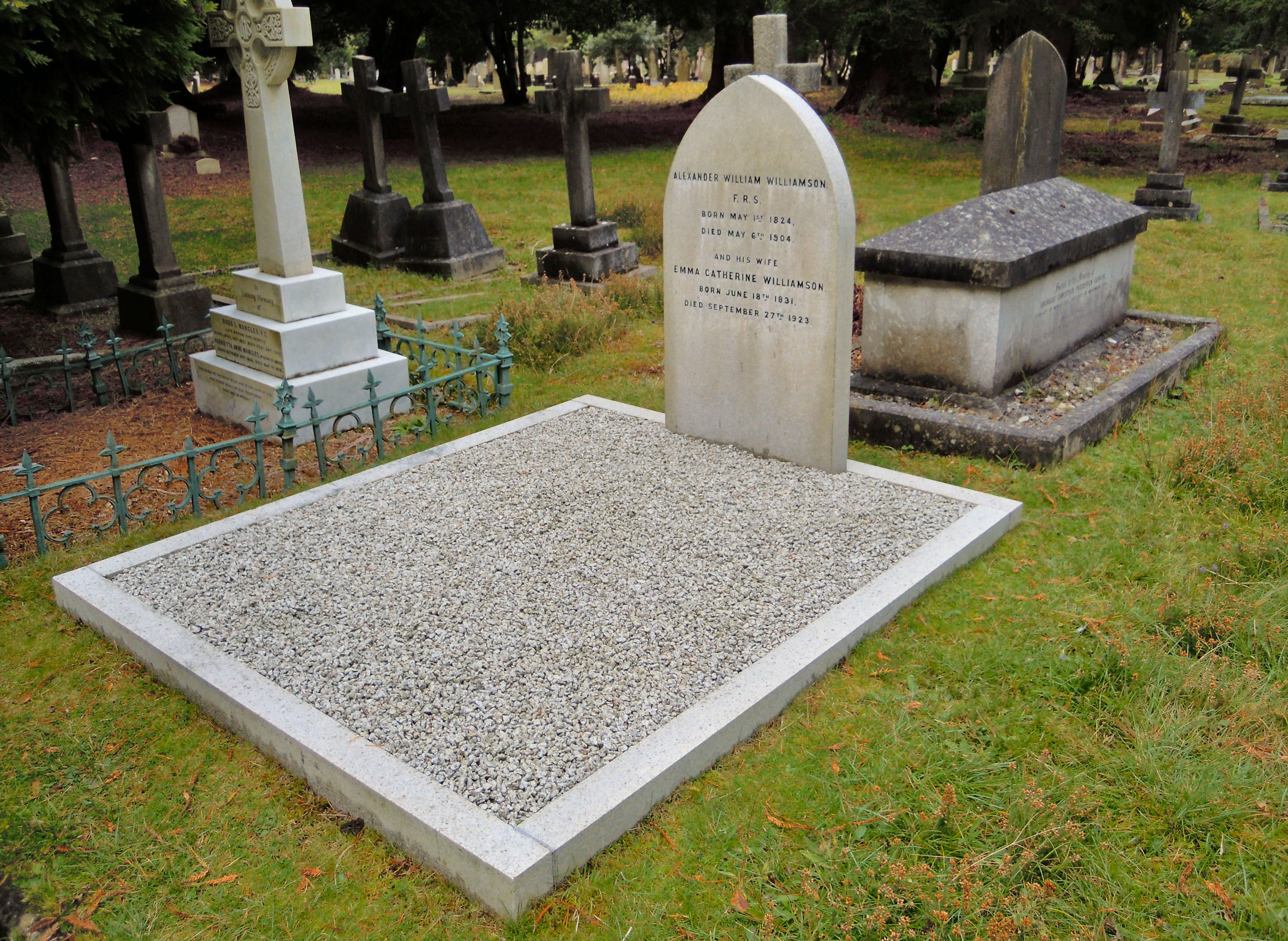
Williamson's grave in Brookwood Cemetery

For his work on etherification, Williamson received a Royal medal from the Royal Society in 1862, of which he became a fellow in 1855, and which he served as foreign secretary from 1873 to 1889. He was twice president of the London Chemical Society, from 1863 to 1865 and from 1869 to 1871, and was elected to Honorary membership of the Manchester Literary and Philosophical Society in 1889.
