= Jikō Higashifushimi =

Jikō Higashifushimi (東伏見 慈晃, Higashifushimi Jikō; born 21 June 1942), born Moriyoshi Higashifushimi (東伏見 守俶, Higashifushimi Moriyoshi), is the Chief Abbot of the Shōren-in Temple in Kyoto, Japan. He is also the Governor of Dai Nippon Butoku Kai and a cousin to the Emperor Emeritus Akihito of Japan as well as the son of Higashifushimi Kunihide.
