= Gyosei International College in the U.K. =

Gyosei International College in the UK (GIC) (英国暁星国際大学, Eikoku Gyōsei Kokusai Daigaku), later known as Witan Hall (ウィタン・カレッジ, Witan Karejji; "Witan College") and Witan International College (WIC), was a Japanese international post-secondary education campus, located in Reading, Berkshire. In the final part of its life it became a wholly owned subsidiary of the University of Reading.

It offered undergraduate degrees and master's degrees. Its undergraduate degrees were primarily business studies degrees with language studies or culture studies. Its master's degree programs were in business studies and in culture studies. The school also offered short international career skills courses and English courses. Gyosei students were permitted to take First University Examinations from the University of Reading, and University of Reading students were permitted to take some courses administered by staff of Gyosei College. At one time the Office of International Criminal Justice had a branch office located at Gyosei College.

== History ==
Father Shigeru Tagawa (田川 茂 Tagawa Shigeru), the principal of the Gyosei International School, had wanted to establish an international college as an extension of his school. Dr. Takashi Nozu, the chairperson of the board of trustees and the former president of the Japan Junior Chamber of Commerce, gave his financial support. A committee for the preparation of the establishment of the college was established in April 1987. The Department for Education officially recognised the college in November 1988. The tentative opening was April 1989.

This school was established in 1989. On that year it acquired some land and buildings in a facility along London Road owned by the University of Reading. Gyosei owned and operated Mansfield Hall and St David's Hall to house its students. The site, which Gyosei College took portions of, had a total of 10 acres (4.0 ha) of land. The University of Reading operated in the remainder of the buildings left at the site, consisting of its War Memorial Clock Tower and the Great Hall as well as the garden areas surrounding the two sites.

During the month of April 1989 the college accepted its first students, forty business school students. In April 1990 it accepted 80 students in the business and culture studies departments. It held its opening ceremony on 19 May 1990.

In 1993 the Language Department established a two-year British studies course. In 1994 the college established a BA programme. In 2001 the school accepted the first students for the MA degree programme. The City University, London validated the degrees offered by the Gyosei BA and MA programmes.

In July 2002 college's name officially changed to "Witan Hall (incorporating Gyosei International College in the UK)." This school's new name was also stated as Witan International College. In 2004 the University of Reading announced that it agreed to take control of the WIC. No further BA or Licencate students would be accepted and the final such students from Witan would graduate in March 2008. The university anticipated that MA students would be admitted in 2004 and 2005. As of 2004 Witan had 200 registered students.

The college closed on 31 March 2008.

== See also ==
- Gyosei International School UK (defunct Japanese boarding school in Buckinghamshire)
- Gyosei International School (international school in Japan)
- Japanese community in the United Kingdom
- Japanese students in the United Kingdom
