= Higashifushimi Kunihide =

Uncle of Emperor Akihito

Count Higashifushimi Kunihide
- 東伏見慈洽
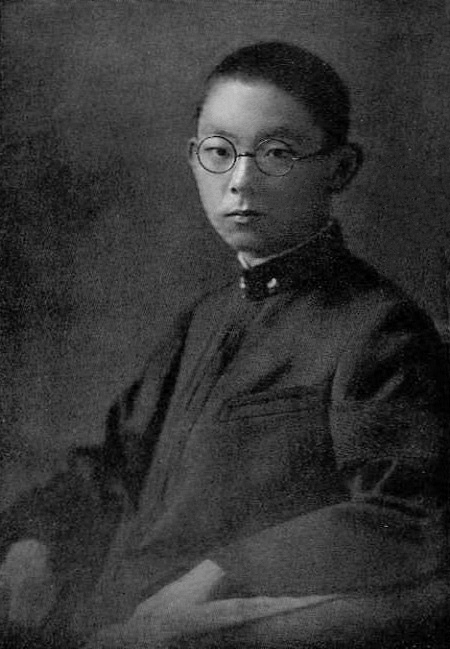
- Prince Higashifushimi Kunihide, circa 1920s
- Born: 16 May 1910; Azabu, Tokyo, Empire of Japan
- Died: 1 January 2014 (aged 103); Kyoto, Japan
- Other names: Kuni Kunihide; Higashifushimi Jigō
- Occupation: Buddhist monk
- Title: Count (until 1947)
- Spouse: Yasuko Kamei (m. 1938; died 2009)
- Children: 4, including Jiko Higashifushimi
- Parents: Kuni Kuniyoshi; Shimazu Chikako
- Relatives: Prince Higashifushimi Yorihito (great uncle); Empress Kōjun (sister); Emperor Shōwa (brother-in-law); Emperor Emeritus Akihito (nephew)

Count Higashifushimi Kunihide (東伏見 邦英; 16 May 1910 – 1 January 2014) was the titular head of the Higashifushimi-no-miya, an extinct branch of the Imperial House of Japan, and a Buddhist monk. He was the youngest brother of Empress Kōjun and was the maternal uncle of Emperor Emeritus Akihito. If he had kept his Imperial status, at the time of his death, at age 103, he would have been the longest-lived member, of the Imperial House of Japan. His Dharma name was Jigō (慈洽).

== Life ==
Count Higashifushimi Kunihide was born as Prince Kuni Kunihide (久邇宮邦英王, Kuni-no-miya Kunihide ō) on 16 May 1910, at his family's home in the Toriizaka neighbourhood of the Azabu district of Tokyo, the youngest child of Lieutenant Colonel Prince Kuniyoshi Kuni (1873–1929) and his wife, the former Shimazu Chikako (1879–1956). Prince Kuni's uncle, Admiral Prince Higashifushimi Yorihito, the head of the Higashifushimi-no-miya line, had no heirs; consequently, following consultations with his father, Prince Kunihide was given to the custody of his great-uncle and his wife on 26 October 1919, though not formally adopted. Upon attaining his majority in 1930, he sat in the House of Peers as an imperial prince until the following year, when the Emperor, his cousin and brother-in-law, requested him to relinquish his imperial status to perpetuate the Higashifushimi name. Upon leaving the imperial family, he was ennobled as Count Higashifushimi and appointed a Grand Cordon of the Order of the Paulownia Flowers. He held the title of count until October 1947, when the nobility and cadet branches of the imperial family lost their status.

After taking a degree in history from Kyoto Imperial University, he taught as a lecturer at the university until 1952, when he took his vows as a Buddhist priest in the Zenkō-ji daikanshin in Nagano, becoming the abbot of the Tendai Buddhist Shōren'in Temple in Kyoto the following year, taking the Buddhist name Jigō (慈洽). He took a PhD in Asuka period art from Kyoto University in 1956. He was appointed chairman of the Kyoto Association of Buddhist Temples in 1985, serving until his death. As chairman, he led the opposition to a ¥50 temple admission fee imposed by the city of Kyoto, denouncing it as "contrary to the principle of separation of church and state and freedom of religion." The fee was subsequently repealed.

In 2004, he passed the position of abbot of the Shōren'in to his second son, Jiko Higashifushimi, becoming its emeritus abbot. His wife of 71 years, Yasuko Kamei, died on 29 September 2009, at age 91. He developed orthostatic hypotension in April 2006, and was bedridden since then. He turned 100 on 16 May 2010. As of 4 July 2012, when he surpassed Naruhiko, by reaching the age of 102 years and 49 days, he remains the longest-lived member of the Imperial House of Japan. He died of chronic heart failure at a hospital in Kyoto on 1 January 2014, at age 103.

== Ancestry ==
Ancestors of Higashifushimi Kunihide

16. Prince Fushimi Sadayuki (1776-1841)
8. Prince Fushimi Kuniie (1802-1872)
4. Prince Kuni Asahiko (1824-1891)
18. Toriishoji
9. Toriishoji Nobuko
2. Prince Kuni Kuniyoshi (1873-1929)
10. Izumitei Toshimasu
5. Izumi Makiko (1850-1881)
1. Count Higashifushimi Kunihide
24. Shimazu Narioki, 10th Daimyō of Satsuma (1791-1859)
12. Prince Shimazu Hisamitsu (1817-1887)
25. Okada Yura (1795-1866)
6. Prince Shimazu Tadayoshi, 11th Daimyō of Satsuma (1840-1897)
26. Shimazu Tadakimi, Lord of Shigetomi (1799-1872)
13. Shimazu Chimoko (d. 1847)
3. Princess Kuni Chikako (1879-1956)
7. Yamazaki Sumako (1850-1927)

== See also ==
- List of centenarians (royalty and nobility)
