= Gyosei International School UK =

- 英国暁星国際学園

Location
- Japonica Lane, Willen Park, Milton Keynes, Buckinghamshire MK15; Milton Keynes; United Kingdom; 52.055°N 0.731°W

Information
- Type: Private high school

Gyosei International School UK (英国暁星国際学園, Eikoku Gyōsei Kokusai Gakuen) was a Japanese international school in Milton Keynes, Buckinghamshire, England. The school, a Catholic institution, was one of several Japanese private schools in the United Kingdom with a Japanese curriculum. This school was an overseas branch of a Japanese private school, or a Shiritsu zaigai kyōiku shisetsu (私立在外教育施設).

The former Gyosei campus is located at Willen Park. It included a baseball diamond, dormitories, and sports facilities. The facility was a boarding school.

== History ==
The school opened in Milton Keynes in 1987. Father Shigeru Tagawa (田川 茂 Tagawa Shigeru), the principal of the Gyosei International School, was the founding principal of this school. He opened the school to serve Japanese children in the European Community (EC) who were members of diplomatic families and families on business. The construction company Higgs and Hill won the contract to design and build the school in association with the Mitsui Construction Company. Mitsui Construction was the main contracting company, while Higgs and Hill designed the school. The design and construct programme had a cost of £8 million.

In 1991 the school was Europe's largest Japanese school, with 1,000 students.

As of 1995 the school had 700 students from elementary through after junior high school. In 1998 the school had 9.8 points in its GCSE rankings.

Around 1998 there was an incident where a group of students placed barricades in their dormitory area and loudly made statements against teachers; Lesley Downer The Independent stated that reports cited the students not being permitted to participate in the local football culture nor visiting the McDonald's in town.

The secondary school's peak number of students was 400. In January 2002 it had 30 students, and that month the school announced it would close in March of that year, stating that the economic crisis in Japan was responsible for its closing. By 2002 fewer Japanese executives were being sent abroad and fewer Japanese families sent their children abroad to study. Shiro Suematsu was the school's final chief administrator. The school closed on 8 May 2002.

In 2004 a developer planned to demolish the school campus and replace it with a housing development. The site is now a retirement village.

== See also ==
- Gyosei International College in the UK (defunct Japanese post-secondary college later renamed to Witan Hall)
- Gyosei International School (international school in Japan)
- Japanese community in the United Kingdom
- Japanese students in the United Kingdom
- Japan–United Kingdom relations

British international schools in Japan:

- The British School in Tokyo
