= Komatsu-no-miya =

Komatsu-no-miya 小松宮
- Shinnōke
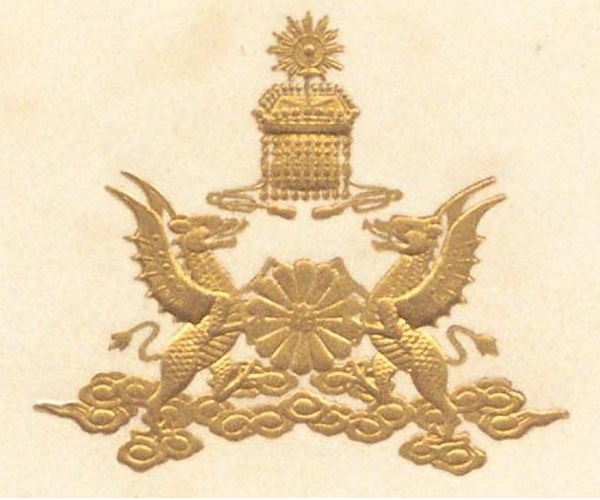
- Origin: Yamashiro Province
- Founder: Prince Komatsu Akihito

Komatsu
- Pronunciation: Komatsu

Origin
- Origin: Japanese
- Region of origin: Japanese

Other names
- Variant form: Higashifushimi

The Komatsu House (Komatsu-no-miya) or Higashifushimi (東伏見) ōke (princely house) was the sixth oldest branch of the Imperial House of Japan, created from branches of the Fushimi-no-miya house, presently extinct. It was founded by Imperial Prince Yoshiaki, the seventh son of Prince Fushimi-no-miya Kuniye, in 1872. Prince Yoshiaki was given the title of komatsu-no-miya and changed his first name to Akihito. Since he died without an heir, the Komatsu-no-miya reverted to Higashifushimi-no-miya (東伏見宮家) in 1903.

== Higashifushimi-no-miya / Komatsu-no-Miya ==
The Higashifushimi-no-miya house was formed by Prince Yoshiaki, seventh son of Prince Fushimi Kuniye.

	Name	Born	Succeeded	Retired	Died	Comments
1	Prince Higashifushimi Yoshiaki (東伏見宮 嘉彰親王, Higashifushimi no miya Yoshiaki-shinnō); Prince Komatsu Akihito (小松宮 彰仁親王, Komatsu-no-miya Akihito-shinnō)	1846; X	1867; 1872	1872.	X 1903	changed name in 1872
2	Prince Higashifushimi Yorihito (東伏見宮 依仁親王, Higashifushimi no miya Yorihito-ō)	1876	1903	.	1922	brother of Akihito reverted name back to Higashifushimi

In 1931, Emperor Hirohito directed his brother-in-law, Prince Kuni Kunihide, to leave Imperial Family status and become Count Higashifushimi Kunihide (hakushaku under the kazoku peerage system), to prevent the Higashifushimi name from extinction. Dowager Princess Higashifushimi Kaneko became a commoner on 14 October 1947. She died in Tokyo in 1955.
