= Shōren-in =

Buddhist temple in Kyoto, Japan

Shōren-in (青蓮院)
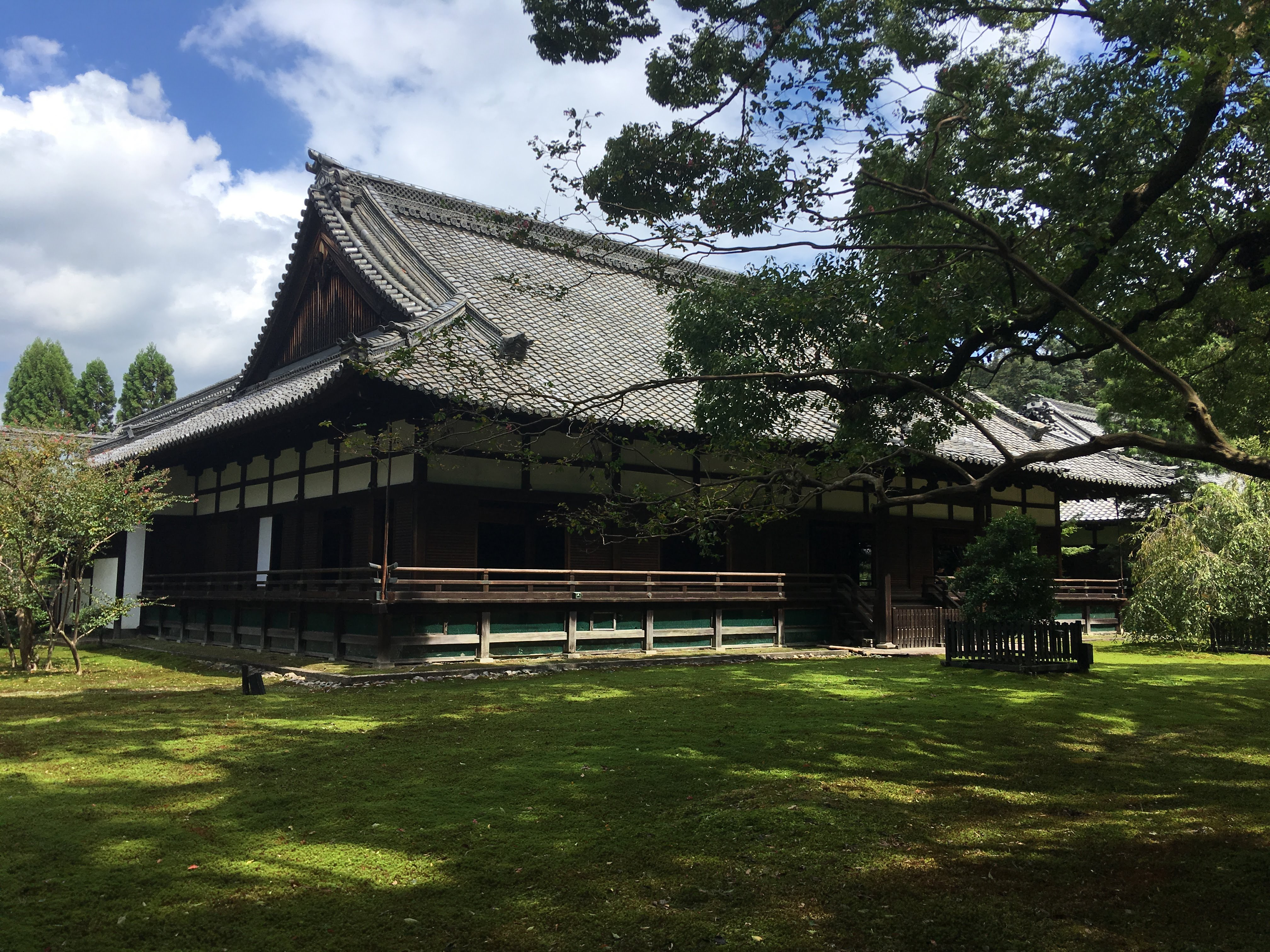
- Front yard in of the Shinden

- Location within Kyoto Prefecture Location within Japan

Religion
- Affiliation: Buddhism
- Deity: Shijōkōbuchō (Prajvaloshnisa)

Location
- Location: 69-1 Awadaguchi Sanjōbōchō, Higashiyama-ku, Kyoto-shi, Kyoto-fu
- Country: Japan
- Coordinates: 35°0′26.32″N 135°46′59.51″E

Architecture
- Founder: Saichō
- Completed: c.1150

Website
- Official website
- National Historic Site

Shōren-in (青蓮院) is a Buddhist temple located in the Awadaguchi Sanjōbōchō neighborhood of Higashiyama-ku, Kyoto, Japan. It belongs to the Tendai sect of Japanese Buddhism. It is also known as the Shōren-in Monzeki (青蓮院門跡). Its precincts were designated a National Historic Site in 1942.

== History ==
Shōren-in originated from a small chapel called Shōren-bō built by Saichō in the eastern precinct of Mount Hiei. The site is currently the third parking lot of Enryaku-ji. Shōren-bō was the residence of numerous famous monks including En'nin. It was moved to a location in Sanjō Shirakawa, slightly northwest of the current location at the end of the Heian period. In 1150, Emperor Toba and Empress Bifukumon'in made Shōren-bō an official place of prayer for the imperial family. As a result, the temple's status began to rise. Furthermore, Emperor Toba had his seventh son, Prince Kakukai, making it became a monzeki temple, and afterwards numerous sons of the imperial family and regent families served as chief priests. Prince Kakutai became the second head priest, but as for the succession, Kujo Kanezane pressured Kakukai to give it to his younger brother, Jien. During the Kamakura period, the temple was relocated to its current location on high ground to avoid flooding of the Shirakawa River. This was the site of the former temple called Juraku-in. The tomb of Emperor Hanazono, located southeast of the temple, is called "Jurakuin no Ueno Misasagi", which is a remnant of this name.

By the 1220s, the name "Shōren-in Monzeki" first appeared in an Imperial decree of Emperor Go-Saga issued on December 29, 1248. Meanwhile, a dispute over Jien's successor triggered the formation of two factions within Shōren-in, and the internal conflict over the position of monzeki continued for over 100 years until Emperor Go-Daigo mediated and the 16th head priest, Prince Jidō, handed over the position to the 17th head priest, Prince Sōnen. Of the successive chief priests, the third head priest, Jichin, is famous for being the author of the historical book Gukanshō. Jien was the son of the regent Fujiwara no Tadamichi, and was also known as a poet, and served as the head priest of the Tendai sect four times. The 17th head priest, Prince Sōnen, was the sixth son of Emperor Fushimi and was known as a master calligrapher. Prince Sōnen's calligraphy style was called "Shōren-in style" and was the origin of the Japanese style of calligraphy "Goie style" that became widespread during the Edo period. During the Muromachi period, Gien, who later became the sixth shogun of the Muromachi shogunate, Ashikaga Yoshinori, served as the head priest. Shinran Shonin, the founder of the Jodo Shinshu pure land sect, was ordained a monk at Shōren-in at the age of nine.

In 1788 during the Edo period, when the Kyoto Imperial Palace burned down in the Great Kyoto Fire of 1788, Shōren-in became the temporary palace of Empress Go-Sakuramachi. It was therefore also known as the Awata Palace. Her study room was converted into a tea room called "Kobun-tei". For this reason, Shoren-in was designated a National Historic Site.

In November 1872, the medical hospital (currently the Kyoto Prefectural University of Medicine Hospital, which had just been established in September, moved to Shōren-in and began operations, but in July 1880, it moved to its current location. In 1893, a major fire occurred and most of the buildings of Shōren-in were lost. Reconstruction was carried out afterwards, with the current main hall completed in 1895. After World War II, Empress Kōjun's younger brother, Higashifushimi Kunihide became head priest. This made the temple a target of arson attacks by the Japanese Communist Party and leftist radicals such as the Chukaku-ha. On April 25, 1993, the teahouse "Kobuntei" was burned down by an arson attack by the Chukaku-ha. His tenure was controversial in other ways, and he one had to face questioning in the Diet of Japan after having sold off numerous Important Cultural Properties once held by the temple to other temples and private collectors to raise funds for the restoration and maintenance of Shōren-in. After Higashifushimi Kunihide's death at the age of 103 in 2014, the position of chief abbot was inherited by his son, Jikō Higashifushimi.

The temple complex contains a number of buildings connected by corridors. The honzon of Shōren-in, a painting of the Shijōkōbuchō, is enshrined in a cabinet inside the hall, but it is a hibutsu image not usually open to the public. Shijōkōbuchō is a Nyorai and is the principal image of the Shishōkō-hō ritual (a ritual to pray for the protection of the nation and the safety of the imperial family), which is said to be the greatest secret ritual of the Tendai sect, but it is rare for this Nyorai to be the principal image of a temple. The modern artist Hideki Kimura created a number of fusuma sliding doors with blue lotus motifs to evoke the Pure Land.

The gardens include Tsukiyama Sensui Teien (a pond garden with a hill), said to have been created by Sōami in the Muromachi period, and Kirishima Teien (a garden with a pond with a hill), said to have been created by Kobori Enshū in the Edo period. On the west side of the temple grounds, there are four massive eight-hundred-year-old camphor trees (kusunoki), which are designated as a Natural Monument of Kyoto City.

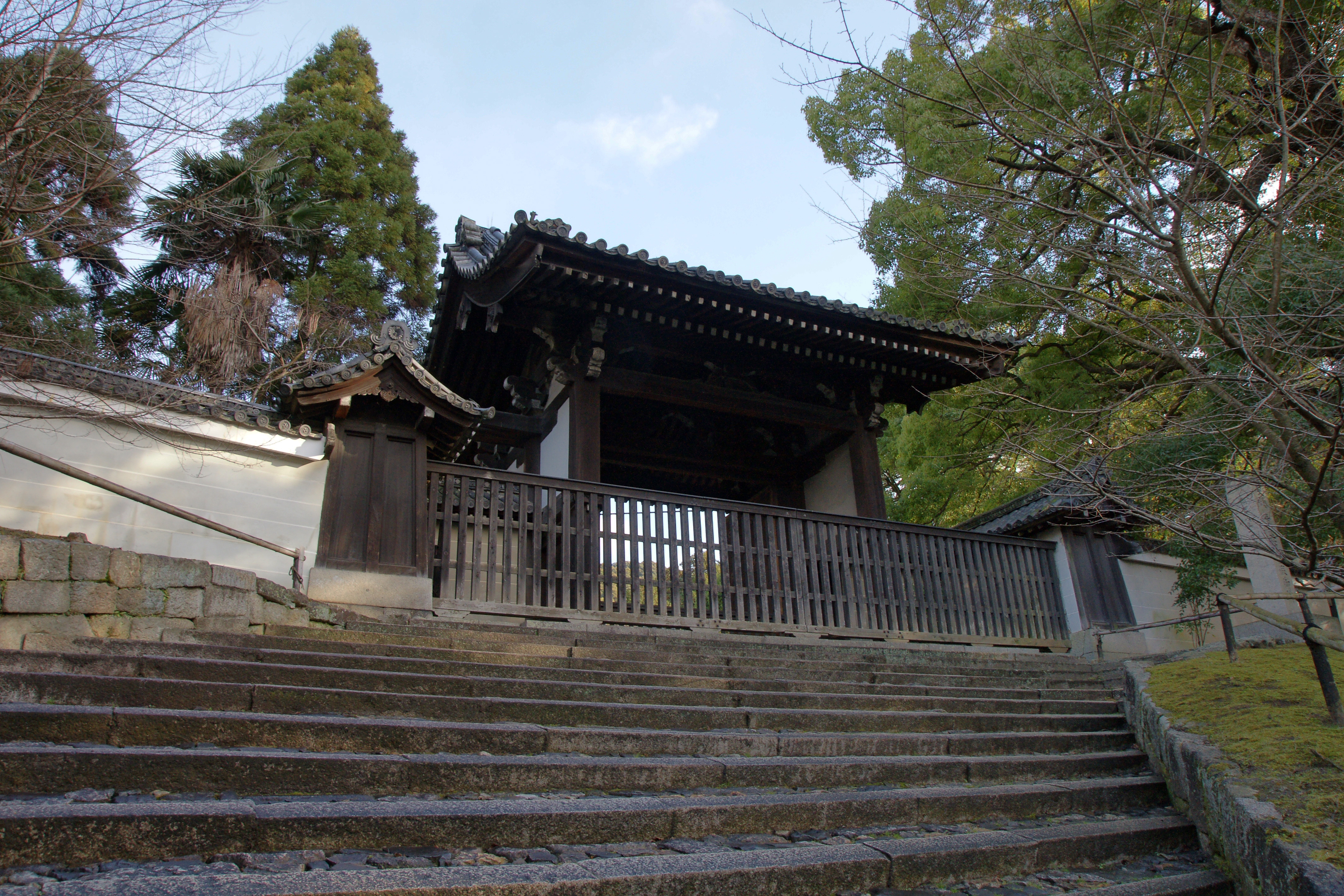
Main gate

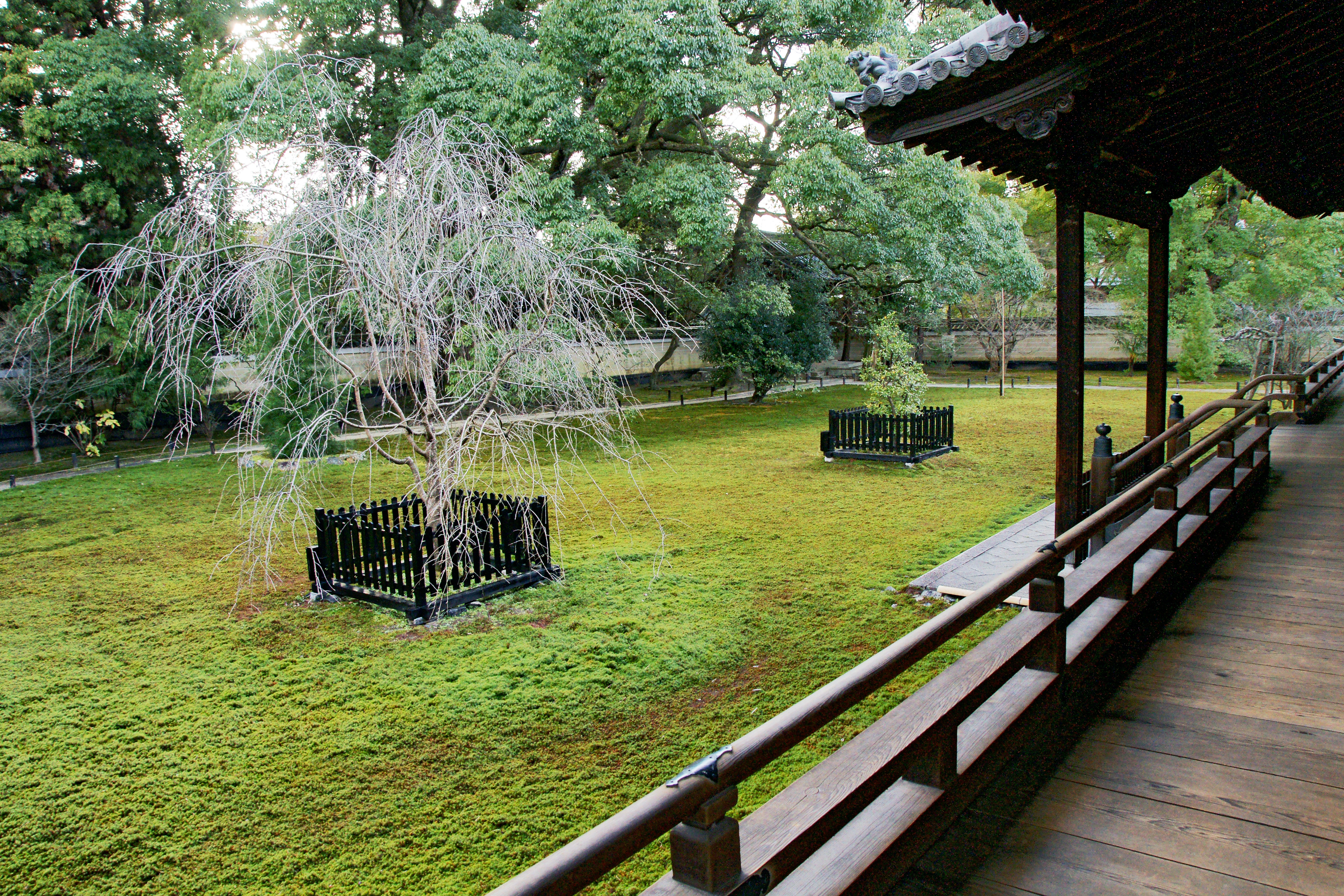
Tachibana and Sakura in front of main hall

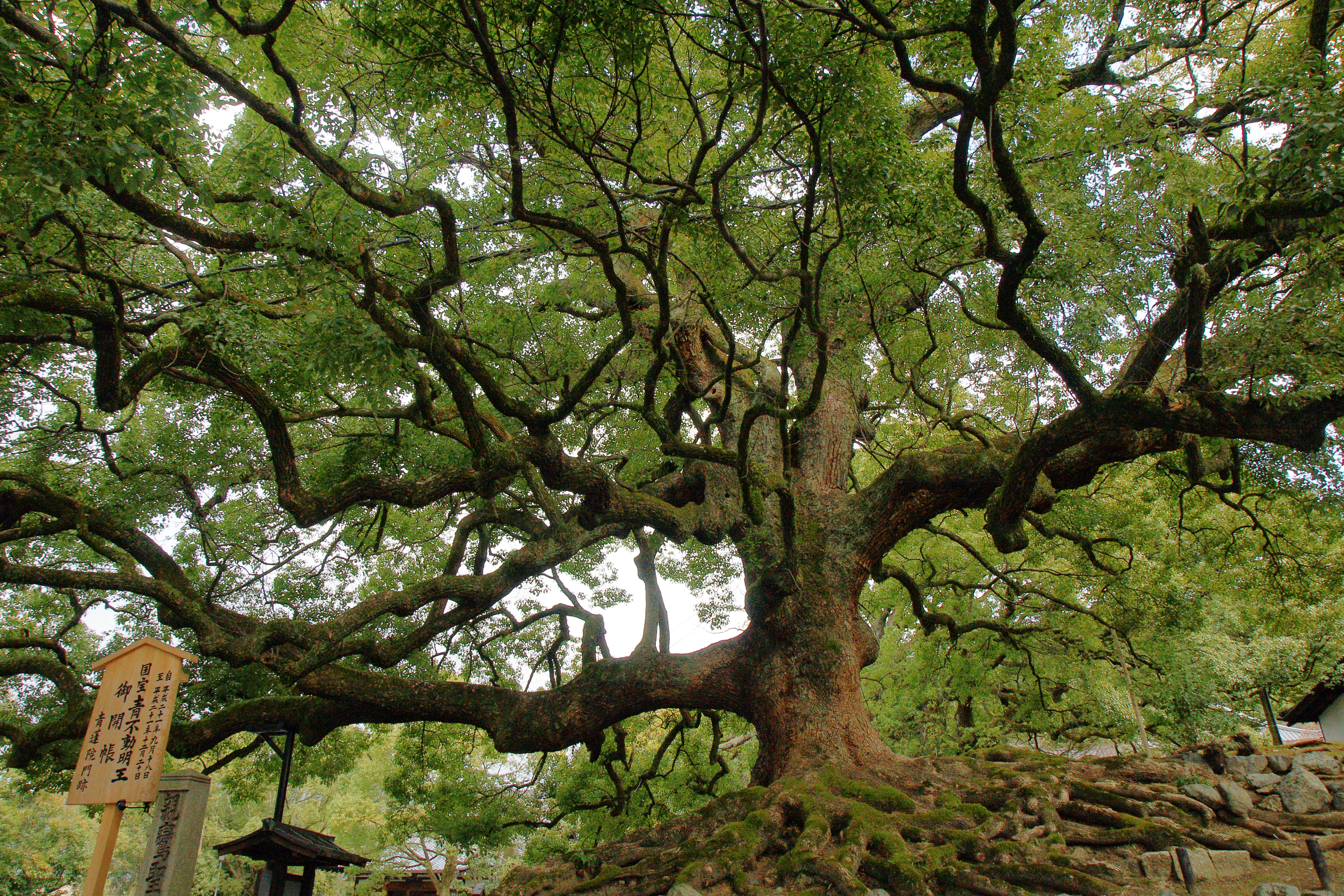
Kusunoki

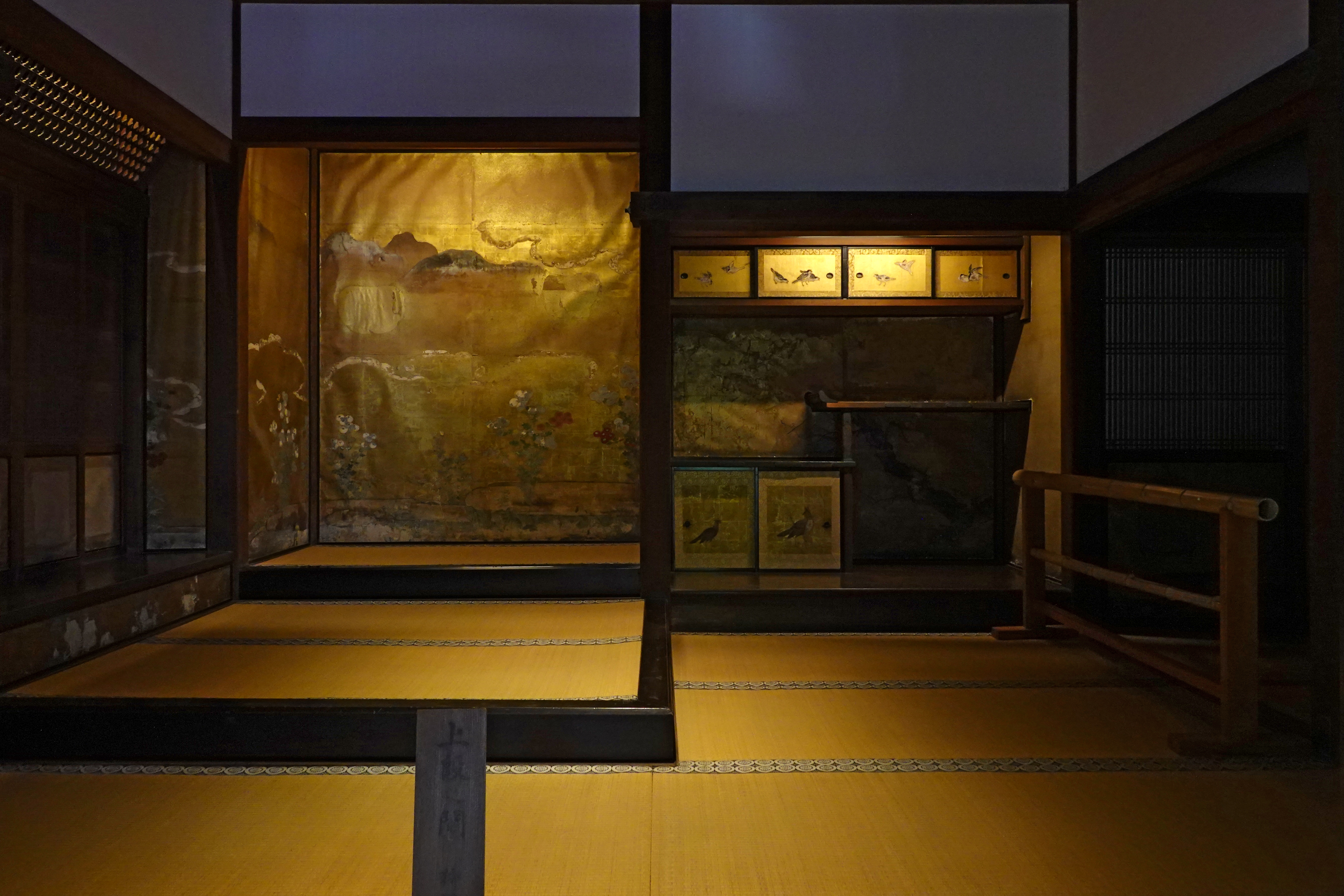
Ko-Goshō.jpg

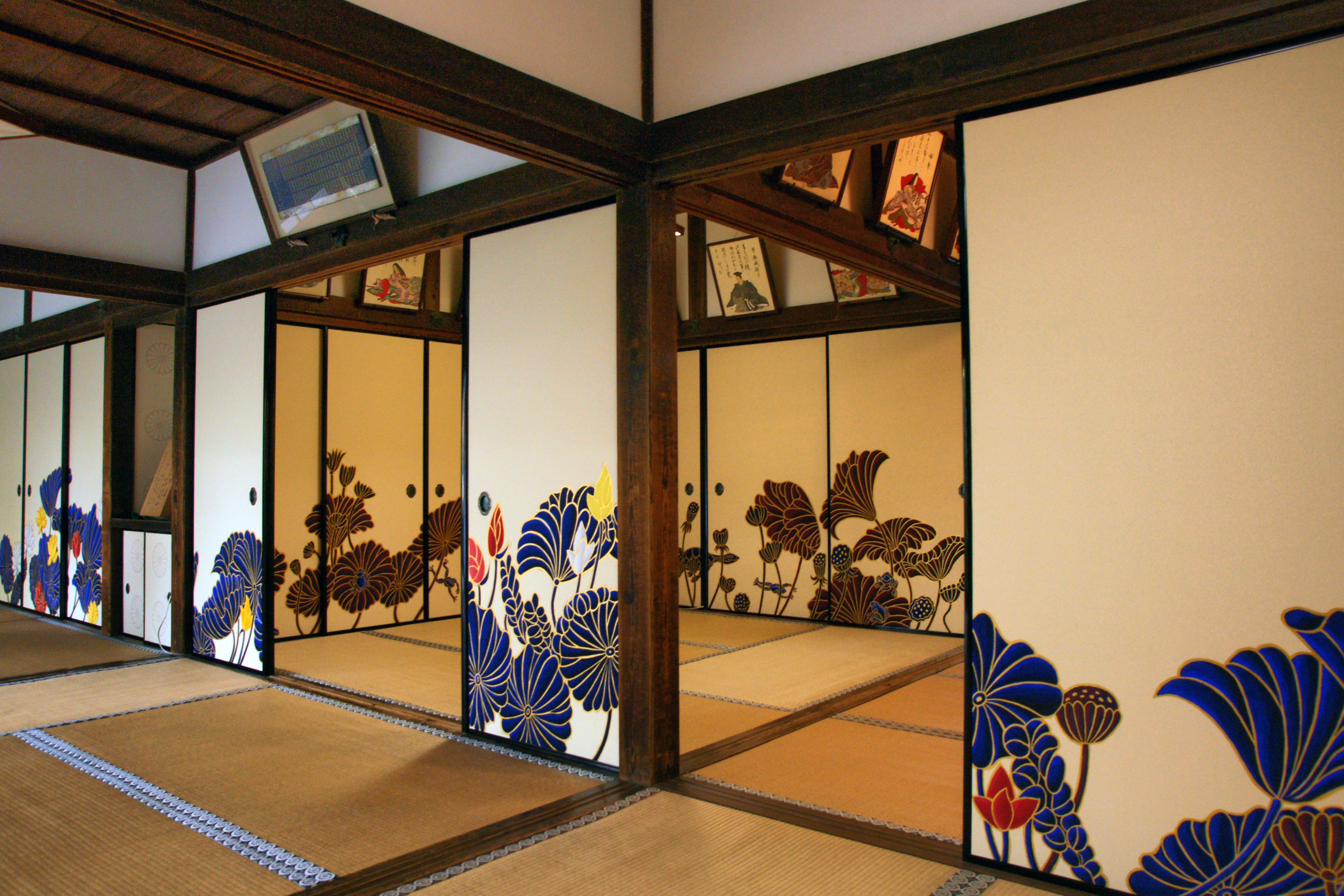
Fusuma by Hideki Kimura

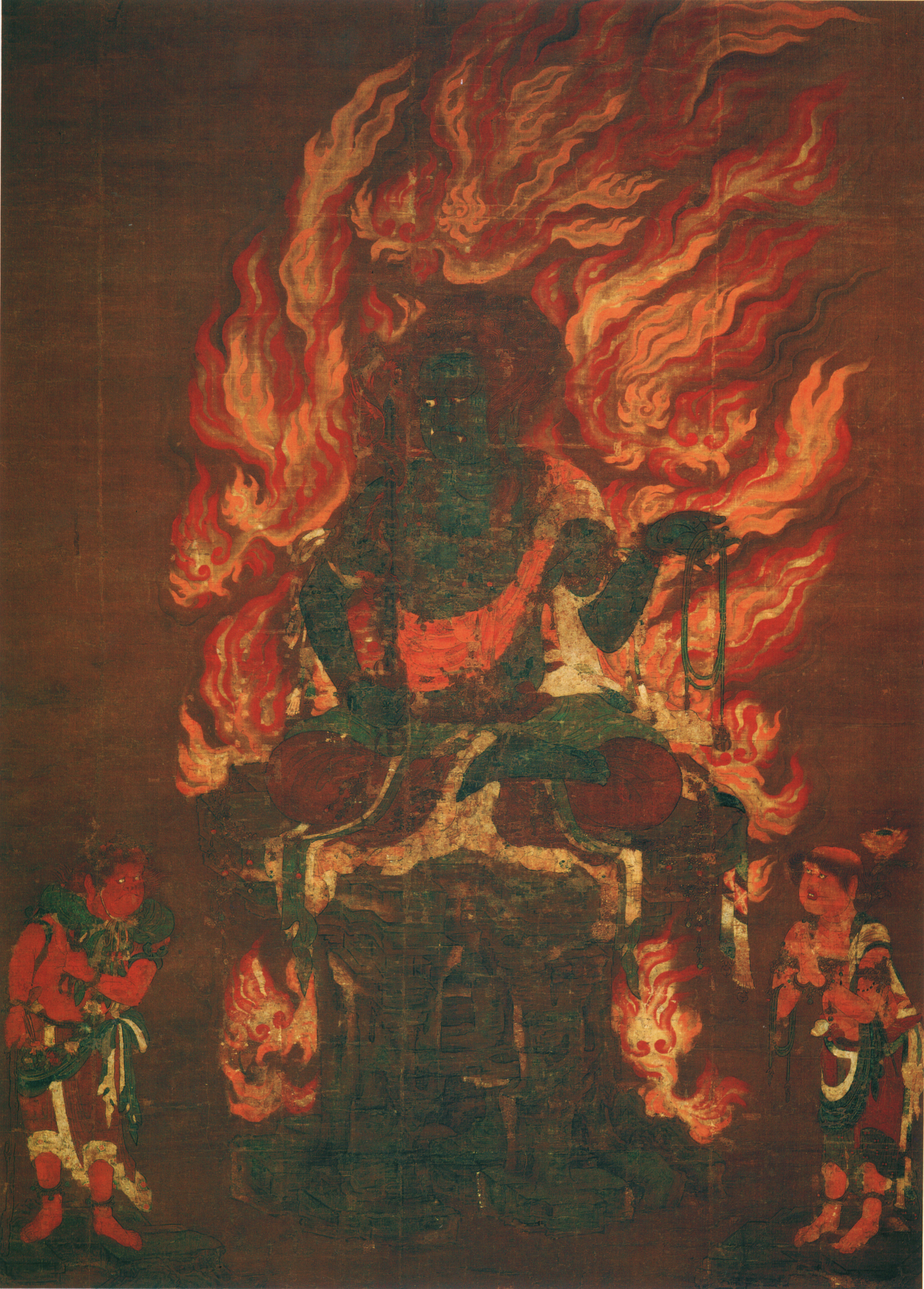
Blue Fudō Myōō (NT)

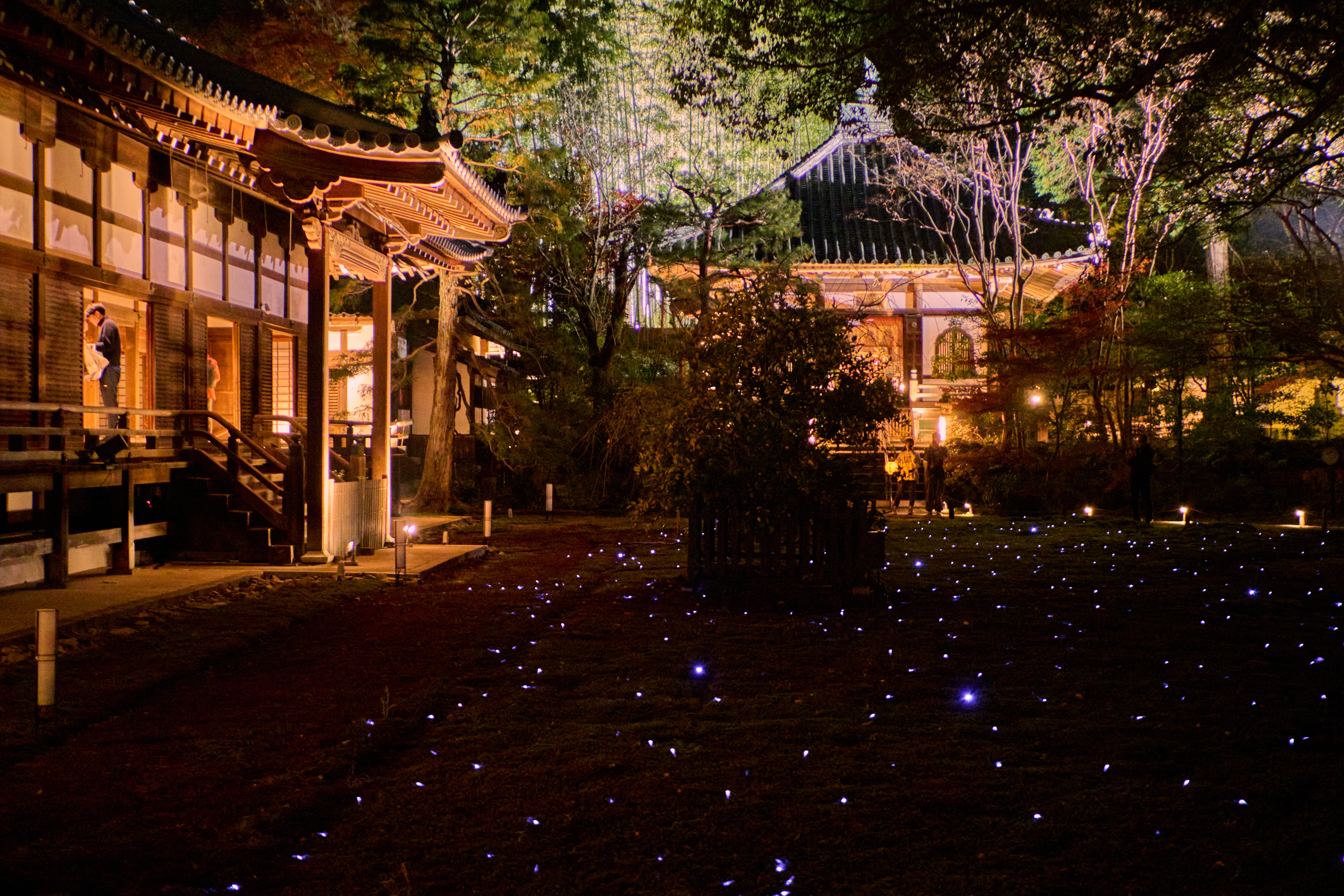
Illuminated courtyard garden of Shoren-in complex at night.

== Blue Fudō Myōō ==
Shōren-in has a Heian period (mid 11th century) Hanging scroll, color on silk, depicting Fudō Myōō and two attendants. It was on loan to the Nara National Museum, but in October 2014, a large hall for goma rituals, the "Seiryuden" was completed at Shogunzuka, located in an exclave of the temple in Higashiyama, where it is open to the public from October to December. It is one of the "Three Fudō Myōō" of Kyoto, along with "Yellow Fudō" at Onjo-ji (Mii-dera) and "Red Fudō" at Mount Koya's Myōō-in. The scroll is a National Treasure. The one currently displayed in Seiryuden is a replica, and the national treasure itself is protected in a vault in the inner hall of the Seiryuden.

== See also ==
- List of National Treasures of Japan (paintings)
- List of Historic Sites of Japan (Kyoto)
