= Luke Hasegawa =

Japanese artist

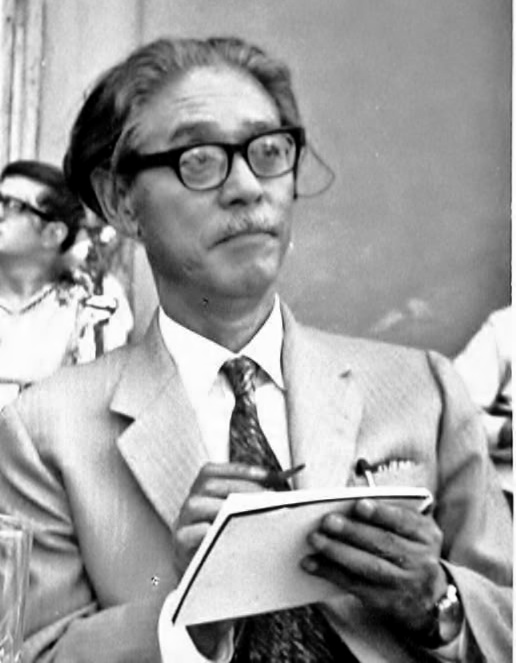
Image of Luke Hasegawa

Luke (Lucas) Hasegawa (9 July 1897 – 3 July 1967) was a Japanese artist and convert to Catholicism who was commissioned to paint murals remembering the 26 Martyrs of Nagasaki for the Church of the Holy Japanese Martyrs in Civitavecchia, Italy.

He is a graduate of Morning Star (Gyosei) International School in Tokyo.

His work is documented in a book titled Each with His Own Brush: Contemporary Christian Art in Asia and Africa by Daniel Johnson Fleming, published by Friendship Press in 1938.
