= Ryota Aikawa =

Japanese baseball player (born 1977)

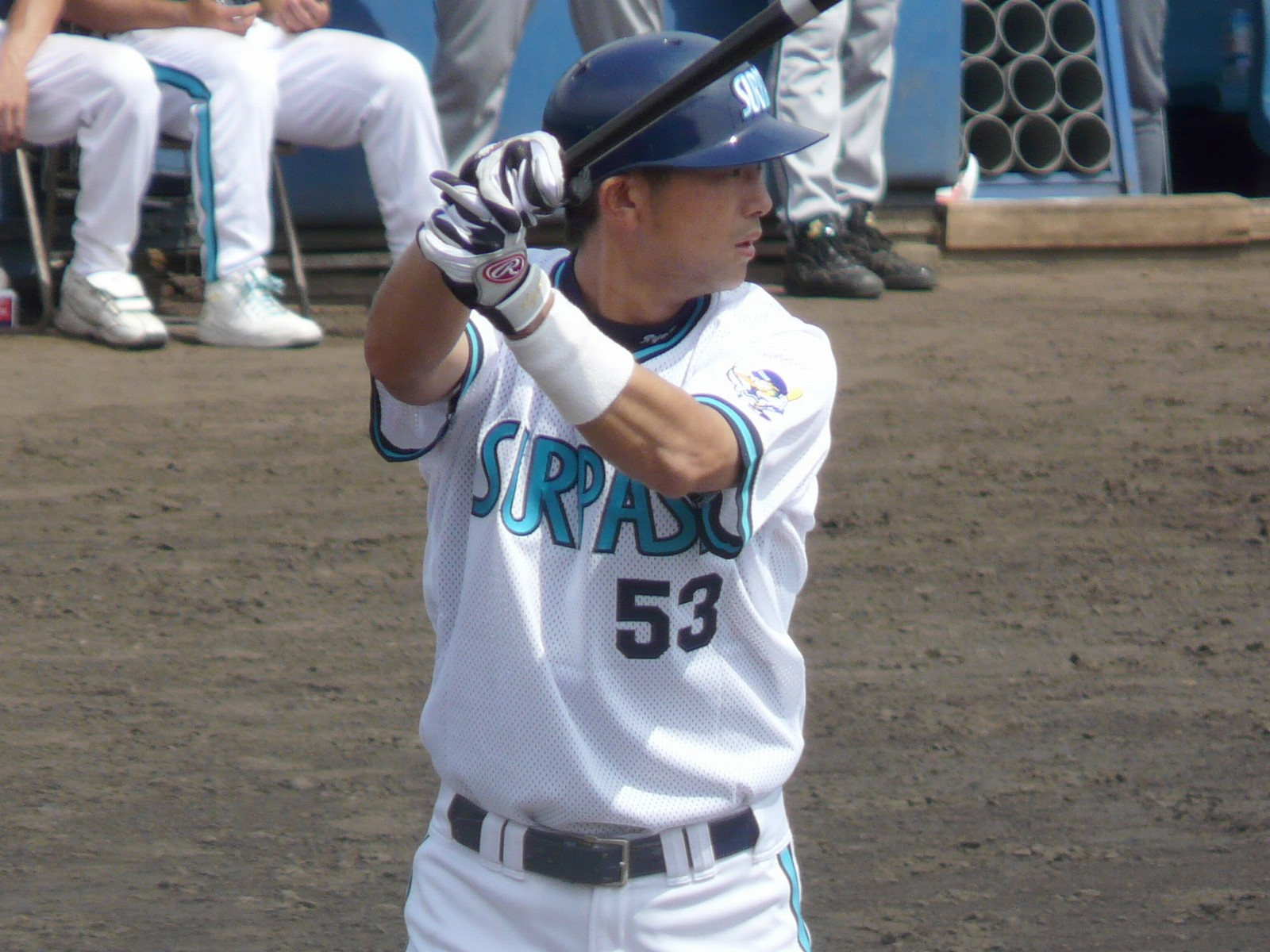
- Outfielder
- Born: January 18, 1977 (age 49); Fukuoka City, Japan
- Bats: Right Throws: Right

debut
- September 16, 1999, for the Orix BlueWave

Career statistics (through 2008)
- Hits: 175
- RBIs: 94
- Batting average: .244
- Stats at Baseball Reference

Teams
- Orix BlueWave/Orix Buffaloes (1999 – 2010)

Ryota Aikawa (相川 良太, Aikawa Ryōta; born January 18, 1977 in Fukuoka City, Japan) is a professional Nippon Professional Baseball player. He is currently with the Orix Buffaloes.
