= Prince Komatsu Akihito =

Japanese Army officer

His Imperial Highness Akihito Prince Komatsu
- 小松宮彰仁親王
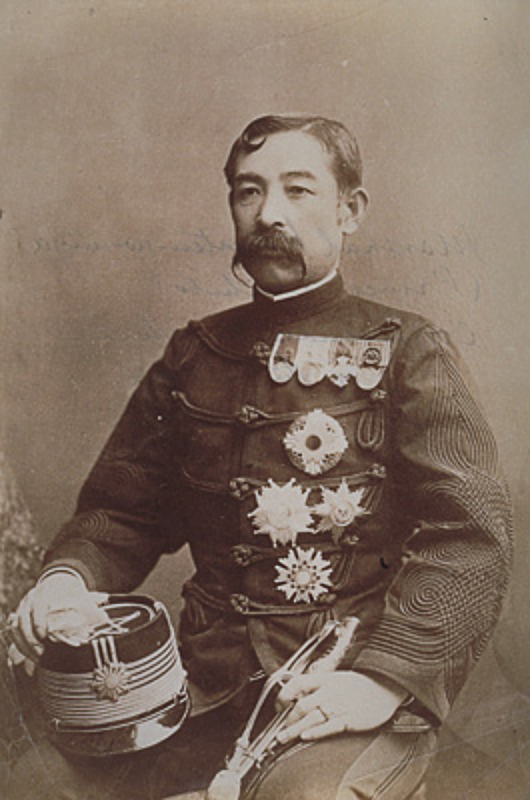

Chief of the Imperial Japanese Army General Staff Office
- In office January 26, 1895 – January 20, 1898
- Monarch: Meiji
- Preceded by: Prince Arisugawa Taruhito
- Succeeded by: Kawakami Soroku

Personal details
- Born: February 11, 1846 Kyoto, Tokugawa shogunate
- Died: February 18, 1903 (aged 57) Tokyo, Empire of Japan
- Awards: Order of the Golden Kite (2nd class); Order of the Rising Sun (1st class); Order of the Chrysanthemum

Military service
- Allegiance: Empire of Japan
- Branch/service: Imperial Japanese Army
- Years of service: 1867–1895
- Rank: Field Marshal; Commander in Chief
- Battles/wars: Boshin War; Satsuma Rebellion; First Sino-Japanese War

Akihito, Prince Komatsu (小松宮彰仁親王, Komatsu-no-miya Akihito shinnō; February 11, 1846 – February 18, 1903) was a Japanese career officer in the Imperial Japanese Army, who was a member of the Fushimi-no-miya, one of the shinnōke branches of the Imperial Family of Japan, which were eligible to succeed to the Chrysanthemum Throne.

== Biography ==
=== Early life ===
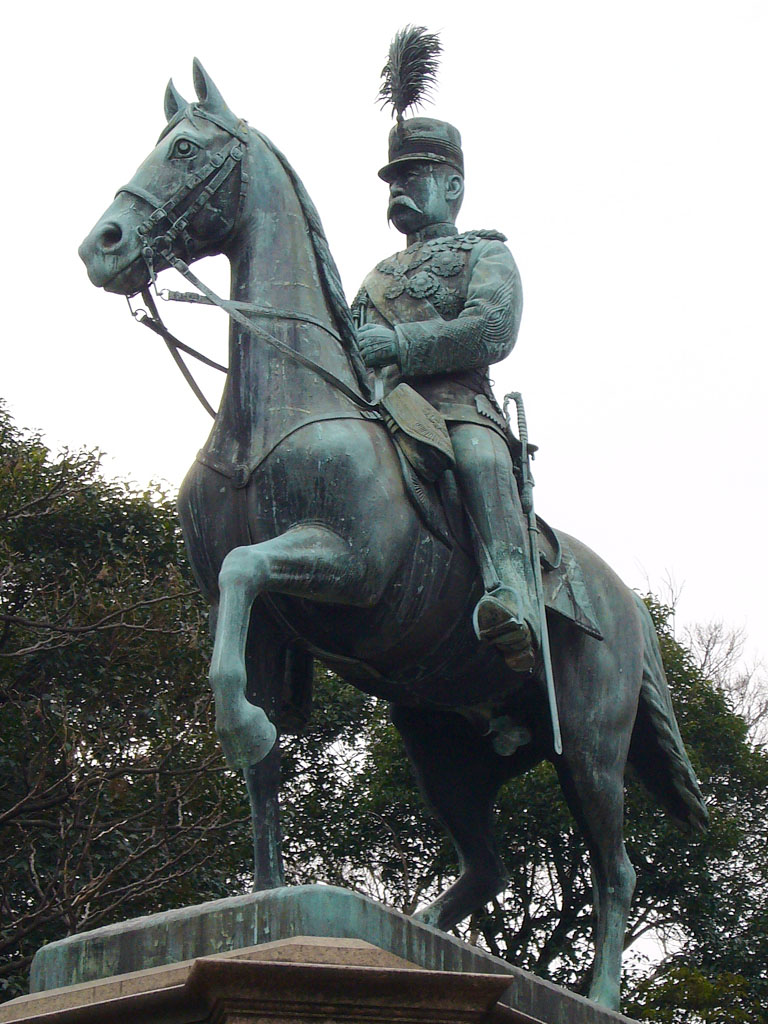
Statue of Prince Komatsu Akihito in Ueno Park.

Prince Akihito was born as Prince Yoshiaki, the seventh son of Prince Fushimi Kuniie. In 1858, he was adopted by Emperor Ninkō as a potential heir to the throne. As he was born when the country was still under rule by the Tokugawa Bakufu, he was sent into the Buddhist priesthood, and assigned to serve at the monzeki temple of Ninna-ji in Kyoto, where he adopted the title Ninnaji-no-miya Yoshiaki (仁和寺宮嘉彰). He returned to secular life in 1867 during the Meiji Restoration, and led imperial forces to Osaka, Yamato, Shikoku and Aizu during the Boshin War to overthrow the Tokugawa shogunate.

Prince Yoshiaki married Arima Yoriko (June 18, 1852 – June 26, 1914), daughter of Arima Yorishige, the former daimyō of Kurume Domain, on November 6, 1869. In 1870, Emperor Meiji assigned him the title of Higashifushimi-no-miya.

=== Military career ===
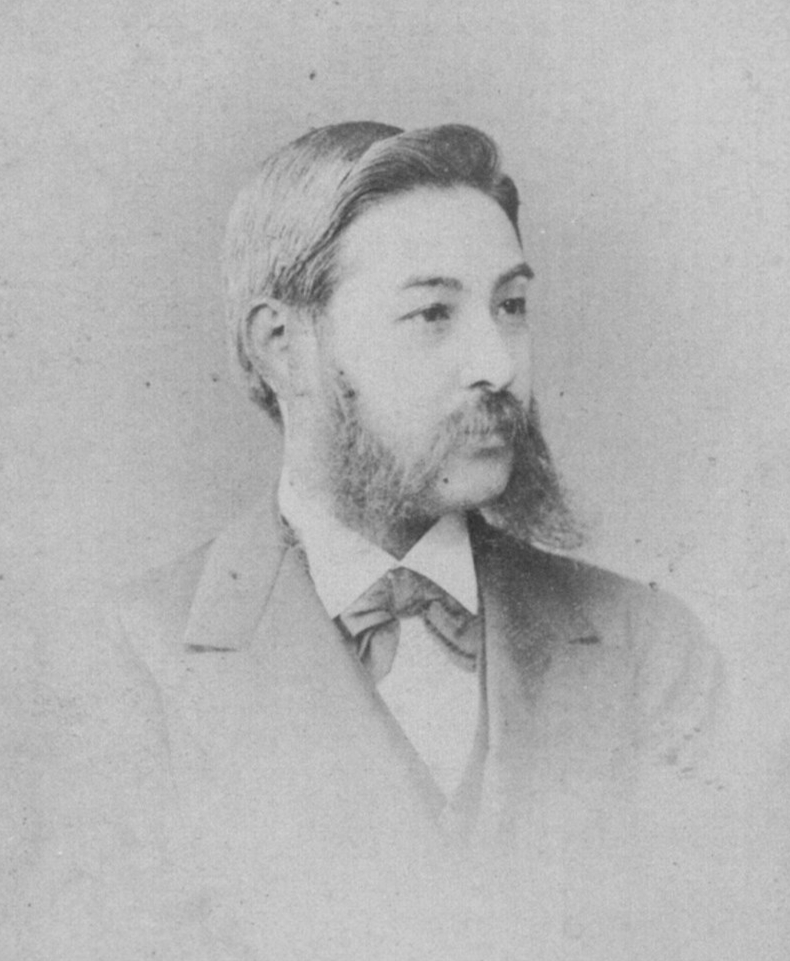
Prince Yoshiaki in England

Prince Yoshiaki studied military tactics in England for two years from 1870 to 1872.

Considered a brilliant military tactician, he helped subdue many of the samurai rebellions in the early years of the Meiji period, including the Saga Rebellion of 1874, and the Satsuma Rebellion of 1877. The emperor granted him the rank of lieutenant general in the newly created Imperial Japanese Army and awarded him the Order of the Rising Sun (1st class).

In 1882, he changed the name of his house to Komatsu-no-miya and his personal name from "Yoshiaki" to "Akihito", and became therefore known as "Prince Komatsu-no-miya Akihito".

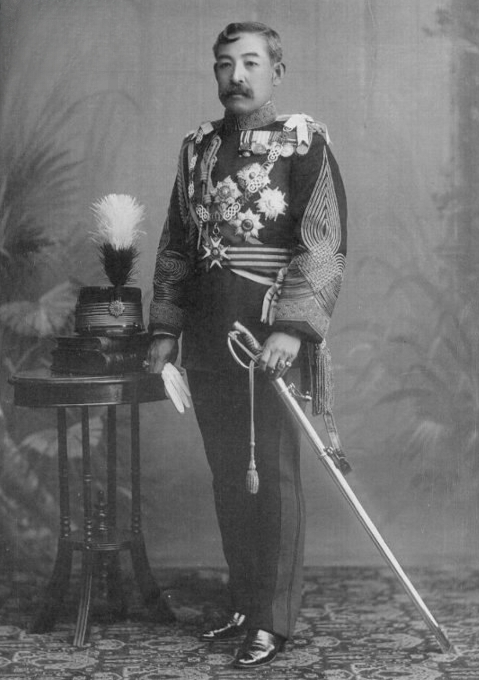
Prince Komatsu Akihito

Prince Komatsu rose to the rank of general and received command of the First Imperial Guard Division in 1890. He was nominal commander of the Japanese expeditionary forces in the First Sino-Japanese War (1894–95) and became a member of the Supreme Military Council. Following the death of his uncle, Prince Arisugawa Taruhito in 1895, Prince Komatsu Akihito became the chief of the Imperial Japanese Army General Staff, and received the honorary rank of field marshal.

== Diplomatic career ==
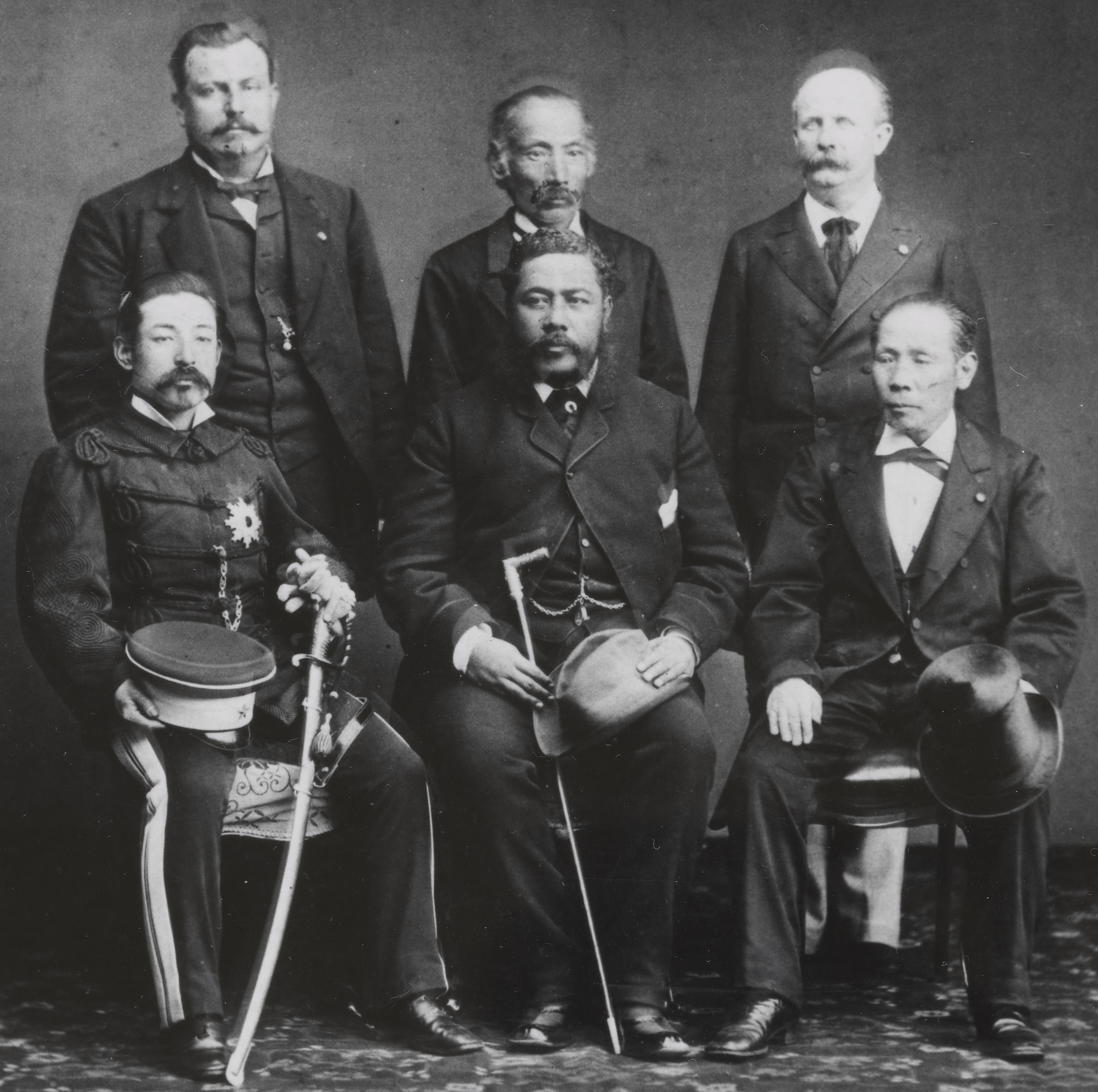
Col. Charles Hastings Judd, Jugai Tokuno Riyosaki, and William N. Armstrong, Prince Komatsu Akihito, King Kalakaua of Hawaii, and Yoshie Sano Tsunetani in Japan (1881)

Prince Komatsu Akihito also served the Meiji government in a diplomatic capacity. In 1886, he went to England, France, Germany and Russia on behalf of Emperor Meiji.

He was sent to Istanbul in 1887 to mark the inaugural step in relations between Ottoman Empire and the Empire of Japan. Prince Komatsu was received in an audience by the Ottoman Emperor ‘Abdu’l-Hamid II.

In June 1902, Prince Komatsu Akihito returned to the United Kingdom to represent Emperor Meiji at the coronation ceremonies for King Edward VII, and also visited France, Spain, Belgium, Germany and Russia.

In his latter years, Prince Komatsu was a patron of the Japanese Red Cross Society and the Dai Nippon Butoku Kai, along with other charity institutions. As Prince Komatsu died without heirs, the title of Komatsu-no-miya reverted to his younger brother, Prince Higashifushimi Yorihito. However, to preserve the Komatsu family name, in 1910 the fourth son of Prince Kitashirakawa Yoshihisa was renamed Teruhisa Komatsu, with the peerage title of marquis (koshaku).
