= Inoue Masaru (civil servant) =

Japanese politician

Viscount Inoue Masaru
- 井上 勝
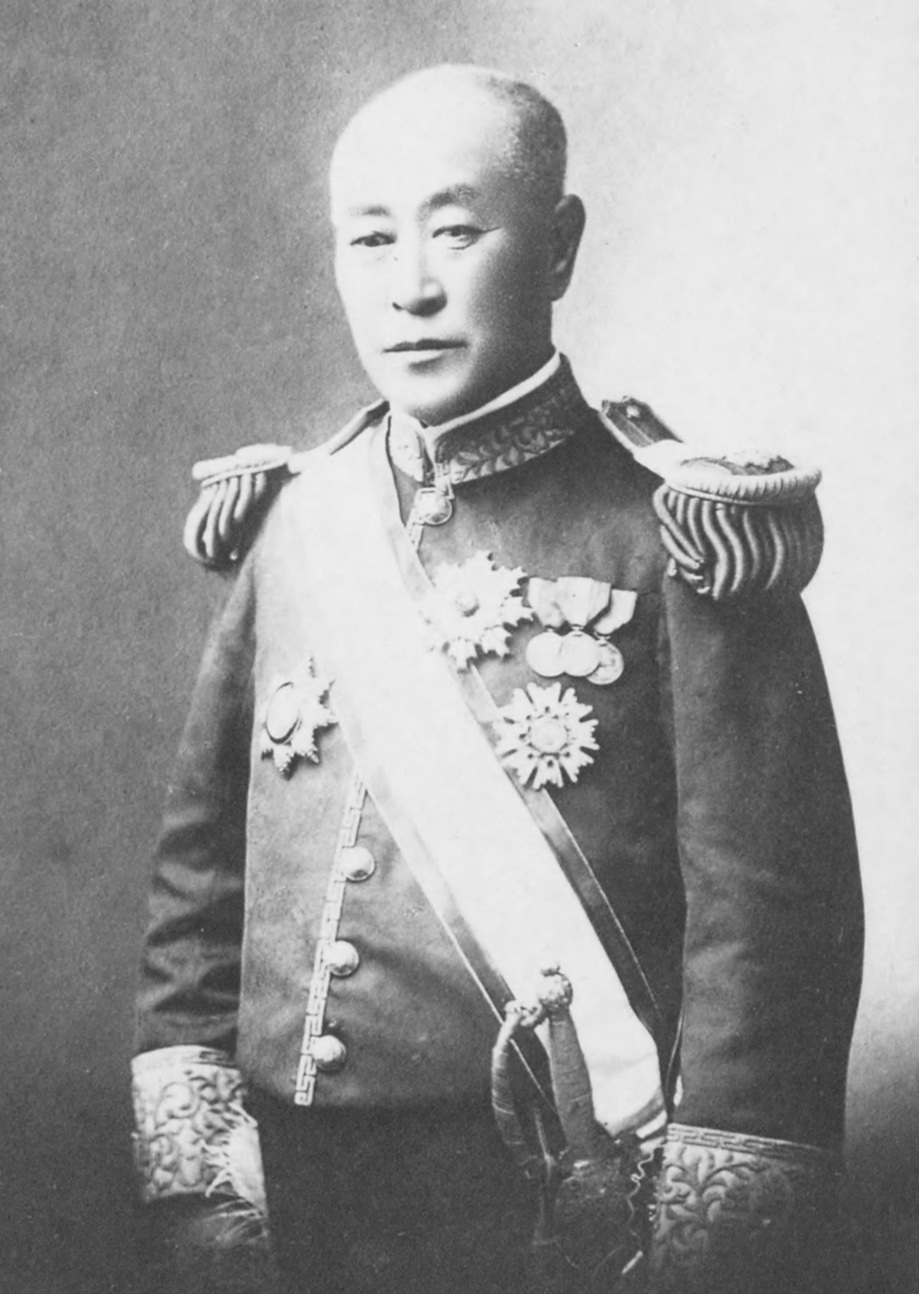

Director-General of the Railway Agency
- In office 29 September 1871 – 17 March 1893
- Preceded by: Office established
- Succeeded by: Matsumoto Sōichirō

Member of the House of Peers
- In office 10 July 1890 – 2 August 1910 Elected by the Viscounts

Personal details
- Born: 25 August 1843 Hagi, Nagato, Japan
- Died: 2 August 1910 (aged 66) London, England
- Education: University College London
- Occupation: Engineer

Viscount Inoue Masaru (井上 勝; 25 August 1843 – 2 August 1910) was the first Director of Railways in Japan and is known as the "father of the Japanese railways".

== Biography ==
He was born into the Chōshū clan at Hagi, Yamaguchi, the son of Katsuyuki Inoue. He was briefly adopted into the Nomura family and became known as Nomura Yakichi, though he was later restored to the Inoue family.

Masaru Inoue was brought up as the son of a samurai belonging to the Chōshū fief. At 15, he entered the Nagasaki Naval Academy established by the Tokugawa shogunate under the direction of a Dutch naval officer. In 1863, Inoue and four friends from the Chōshū clan stowed away on a vessel to the United Kingdom. He studied civil engineering and mining at University College London and returned to Japan in 1868. After working for the government as a technical officer supervising the mining industry, he was appointed Director of the Railway Board in 1871. Inoue played a leading role in Japan's railway planning and construction, including the construction of the Nakasendo Railway, the selection of the alternative route (Tokaido), and the proposals for future mainline railway networks.

In 1891 Masaru Inoue founded Koiwai Farm with Yanosuke Iwasaki and Shin Onogi. After retirement from the government, Inoue founded Kisha Seizo Kaisha, the first locomotive manufacturer in Japan, becoming its first president in 1896. In 1909 he was appointed President of the Imperial Railway Association. He died of an illness in London in 1910, during an official visit on behalf of the Ministry of Railways.

== Honors ==
Inoue and his friends later came to be known as the Chōshū Five. To commemorate their stay in London, two scholarships, known as the Inoue Masaru Scholarships, are available each session under the University College London 1863 Japan Scholarships scheme to enable University College students to study at a Japanese University. The value of the scholarships are £3000 each.

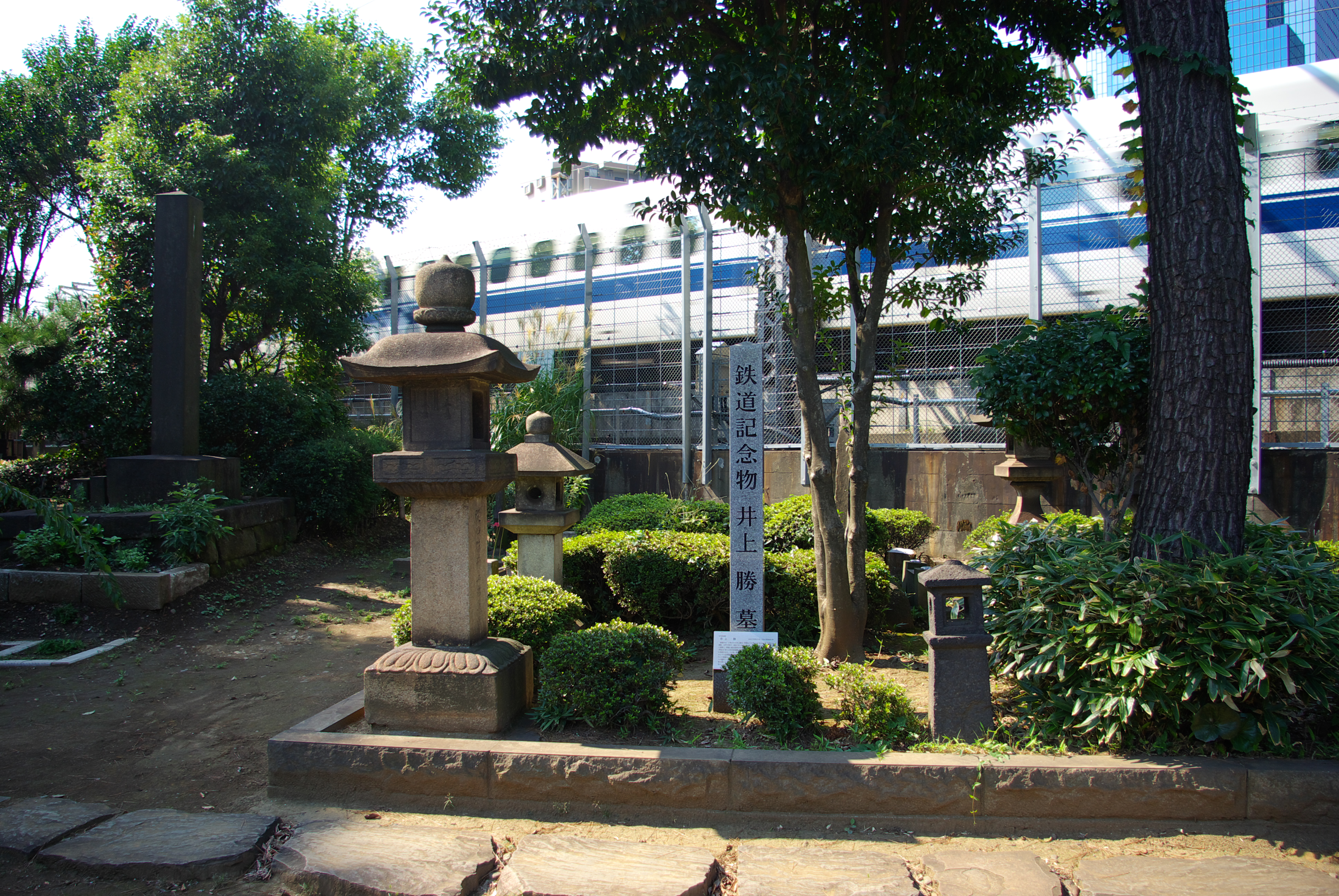
Grave of Inoue Masaru in Tokyo

His tomb is in the triangular area of land where the Tōkaidō Main Line meets the Tōkaidō Shinkansen in Kita-Shinagawa.

== Chōshū Five ==
These are the four other members of the "Chōshū Five":

- Itō Shunsuke (later Itō Hirobumii)
- Inoue Monta (later Inoue Kaoru)
- Yamao Yōzō who later studied engineering at the Andersonian Institute, Glasgow, 1866-68 while working at the shipyards by day
- Endō Kinsuke

== See also ==
- Japanese students in Britain
- Statue of Inoue Masaru
