= Endō Kinsuke =

- 遠藤 謹助
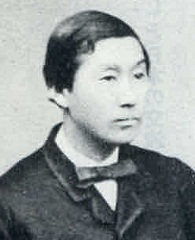
- Born: 31 March 1836; Kōchi, Japan
- Died: 13 September 1893 (aged 57)

Endō Kinsuke (遠藤 謹助; March 31, 1836 – September 13, 1893) was a Japanese statesman in the early Meiji period.

Endō was born to a samurai family in Hagi, Chōshū Domain (present-day Yamaguchi Prefecture. He was selected by the domain to be a member of the Chōshū Five who were smuggled out of Japan in defiance of the Tokugawa bakufu's policy of national seclusion to Great Britain in 1863. Chōshū was desperate to acquire better knowledge of the western nations in order to strengthen the domain in its struggle to overthrow the Tokugawa shogunate. Endō returned from England in 1866, just before the start of the Boshin War.

When Sir Harry Parkes, the British minister in Japan between 1865 and 1883, visited Chōshū in 1866, Endō served as an interpreter, together with Inoue Kaoru, another member of the Chōshū Five.

After the Meiji Restoration and the establishment of the new Meiji government, Endō served as the head of the new National Mint (造幣局, Zōheikyoku) in Osaka, from 1881 to 1883. He is remembered less for his efforts in establishing a unified national currency and more for his policy that the grounds of the Mint should be open for all the people of Osaka in spring, when the sakura trees planted there come into bloom.

== See also ==
- Japanese students in Britain
- Anglo-Japanese relations

== Reference and further reading ==
- Beasley, W. G. The Meiji Restoration. Stanford: Stanford University Press, 1972.
- Cobbing, Andrew. The Japanese Discovery of Victorian Britain. RoutledgeCurzon, London, 1998. ISBN 1-873410-81-6
- Craig, Albert M. Chōshū in the Meiji Restoration. Cambridge: Harvard University Press, 1961
