= Prince Higashifushimi Yorihito =

Japanese prince and admiral (1867–1922)

His Imperial Highness Yorihito Prince Higashifushimi
- 東伏見宮依仁親王
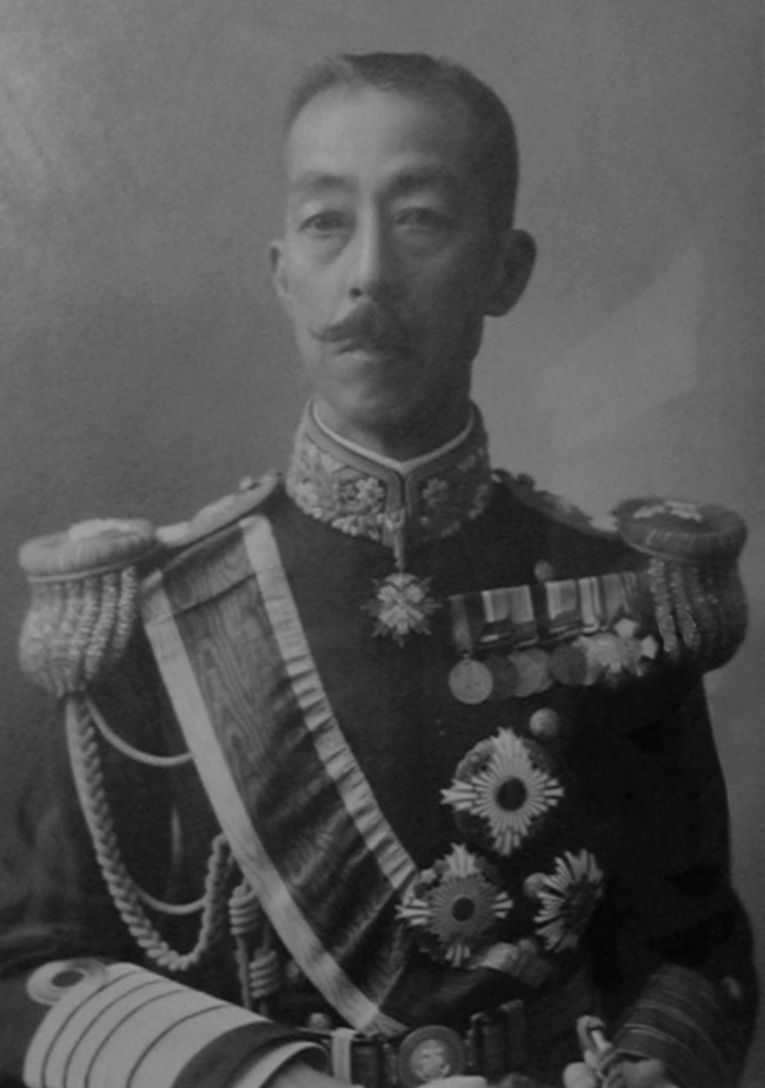
- Born: September 19, 1867; Kyoto, Japan
- Died: June 27, 1922 (aged 54); Hayama, Kanagawa, Japan
- Military career
- Allegiance: Empire of Japan
- Branch: Imperial Japanese Navy
- Service years: 1891–1922
- Rank: Marshal Admiral (posthumous)
- Commands: IJN 2nd Fleet
- Conflicts: First Sino-Japanese War; Russo-Japanese War
- Awards: Collar of the Supreme Order of the Chrysanthemum; Order of the Golden Kite (3rd Class); Recipient of the Royal Victorian Chain; Knight Grand Cross of the Royal Victorian Order

Marshal-Admiral Yorihito, Prince Higashifushimi (東伏見宮依仁親王, Higashifushimi-no-miya Yorihito-Shinnō; September 19, 1867 – June 27, 1922) was the second (and last) head of the Higashifushimi-no-miya, an ōke cadet branch of the Japanese imperial family.

== Early life ==
Born on September 19, 1867, as seventeenth son of Prince Fushimi Kuniie, head of the Fushimi-no-miya, one of the shinnōke branches of the Imperial Family of Japan, which were eligible to succeed to the Chrysanthemum Throne in the event that the main line should die out. He was a younger half-brother of Field Marshal Prince Komatsu Akihito, Prince Kuni Asahiko, General Prince Kitashirakawa Yoshihisa, Field Marshal Prince Kan'in Kotohito and Field Marshal Prince Fushimi Sadanaru.

Originally styled "Prince Fushimi Sadamaro", he was adopted into the Yamashina-no-miya household in 1869, followed by the Komatsu-no-miya house in 1885. He was then adopted by Emperor Meiji as a potential heir to the throne in 1886. He succeeded to the Higashifushimi-no-miya title upon the death of the first head, Prince Komatsu Akihito, on February 3, 1903.

King David Kalākaua, the last reigning king of the Kingdom of Hawaiʻi, visited Japan during his round-the-world tour of 1881. He was the first foreign head of state to visit Japan. During his visit, he proposed a marital alliance between the royal houses of Japan and Hawai'i, wherein his niece (Princess Ka'iulani) would marry Prince Higashifushimi Yorihito (then styled Prince Yamashina Yorihito). Nothing came of the proposal, which might have made a significant impact on the eventual fate of the Kingdom of Hawaii.

== Military and diplomatic career ==
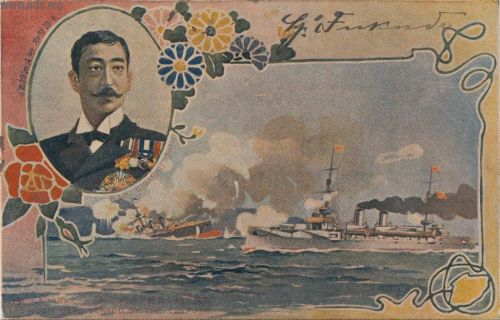
Prince Higashifushimi in 1905 postcard

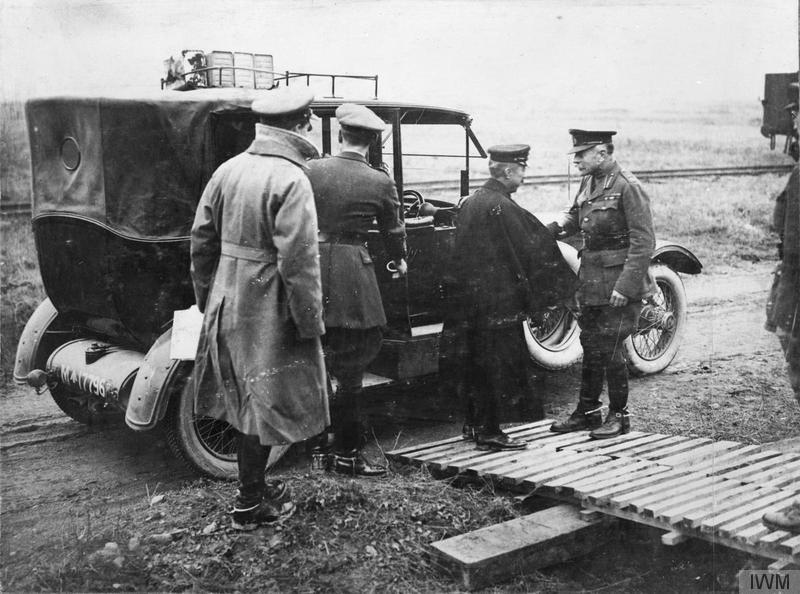
Prince Yorihito visit British field marshal Douglas Haig in Iwuy on November 11, 1918.

Prince Higashifushimi Yoshihito attended the Imperial Japanese Naval Academy briefly, but was then sent to study at Dartmouth Royal Naval College in Great Britain. He lived in France from 1887 to 1890 and graduated from the École Navale. He returned to Japan on October 7, 1891. After serving on the various vessels in the Imperial Japanese Navy, including combat duty in the First Sino-Japanese War, he became executive officer of the armored frigate Fusō (1901). As captain of the Chiyoda from January 12, 1905, and later as captain of Takachiho (1905), he served in combat during the Russo-Japanese War, for which he was awarded with the Order of the Golden Kite (3rd Class). After the end of the war, he served as captain of Kasuga, before joining the Imperial Japanese Navy General Staff in 1906. He was promoted to rear admiral on December 1, 1909.

Prince and Princess Higashifushimi represented Emperor Meiji at the coronation ceremonies of King George V of Great Britain (June 30, 1911). After his promotion to vice admiral on August 31, 1913, he served as Commander in Chief of the Yokosuka Naval District in 1916, and Commander in Chief of the IJN 2nd Fleet in 1917. Promoted to admiral on July 2, 1918, he made one last trip to the United Kingdom from 1918 to 1919. During this visit he presented King George V with the Japanese honorific of Gensui (along with the associated badge and sword), and was awarded the Royal Victorian Chain by the King. Prince Higashifushimi received the posthumous title of marshal admiral and the Collar of the Supreme Order of the Chrysanthemum on his death on June 27, 1922.

== Marriage and family ==
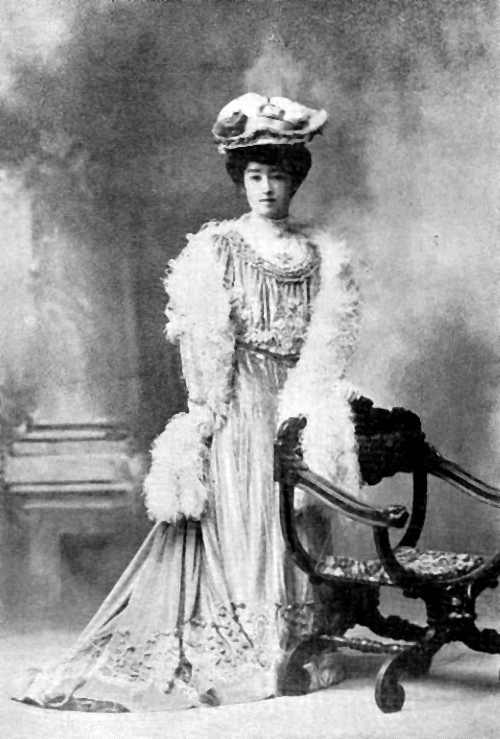
Princess Higashifushimi Kaneko

On February 10, 1898, Prince Higashifushimi Yorihito married Iwakura Kaneko (1876–1955), the eldest daughter of Prince Iwakura Tomomi. As the couple remained childless, the Higashifushimi-no-miya lineage became extinct with the death of Prince Yorihito.

In 1931, emperor Hirohito directed his brother-in-law, Prince Kuni Kunihide, to leave Imperial Family status and become Count Higashifushimi Kunihide (hakushaku under the kazoku peerage system), to prevent the Higashifushimi name from dying out.

Dowager Princess Higashifushimi Kaneko became a commoner on October 14, 1947, with the abolition of the cadet branches of the Imperial Family by the American occupation authorities. She died in Tokyo in 1955.

== Notes ==
Military offices
Preceded by Fujii Kōichi	Yokosuka Naval District; Commander-in-chief; 1 December 1916 - 1 December 1917	Succeeded by Nawa Matahachirō
Preceded by Yashiro Rokurō	2nd Fleet; Commander-in-chief; 1 December 1917 – 13 June 1918	Succeeded by Yamaya Tanin
