= Battle of Canton =

The Battle of Canton may refer to:

- Battle of Canton (March 1841), fought in the First Opium War
- Battle of Canton (May 1841), fought in the First Opium War
- Expedition to Canton (1847), British military expedition
- Battle of Canton (1856), fought in the Second Opium War
- Battle of Canton (1857), fought in the Second Opium War
- Battle of Guangzhou, fought in the Warlord Era
- Second Battle of Guangzhou, fought in the Chiang-Gui War
- Canton Operation, fought in the Second Sino-Japanese War
