= Battle of Canton (1856) =

Coordinates: 23°6′42″N 113°15′47″E

- Part of the Second Opium War
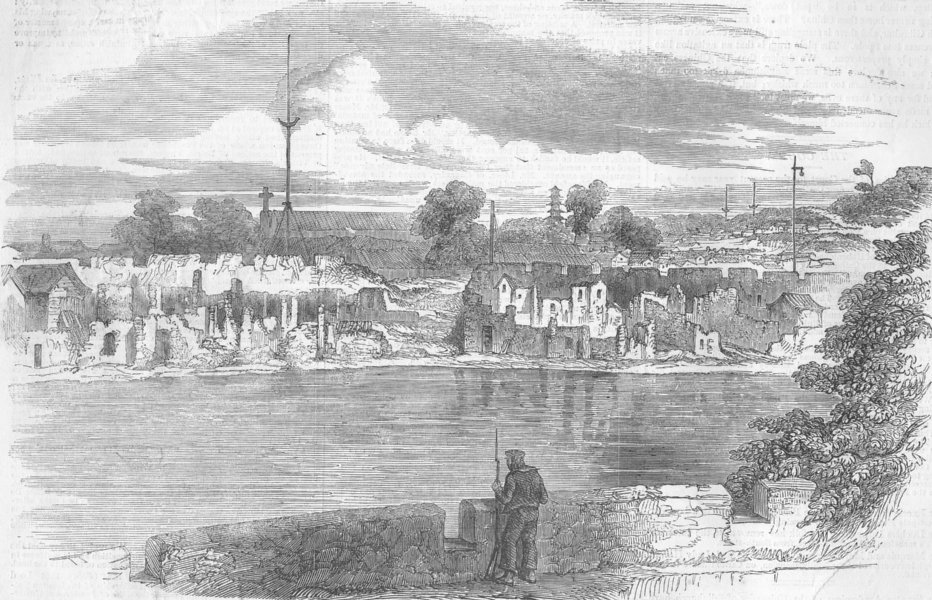
- Ruined walls of Canton from the Dutch Folly Fort
Date	23 October – 5 November 1856
Location	Canton, Guangdong, China
Result	British victory

Belligerents
United Kingdom	Qing China

Commanders and leaders
Michael Seymour	Ye Mingchen

Strength
9 ships 580	Unknown

Casualties and losses
2 killed 12 wounded	18–19 killed & wounded

The Battle of Canton was fought between British and Chinese forces at the city of Canton (Guangzhou), Guangdong province, China on 23 October to 5 November 1856 during the Second Opium War.

== Battle ==
On 23 October, British operations began with the attack on four forts known as the Barrier Forts in the Pearl River. The Coromandel and Barracouta captured the forts with slight opposition, the first shot in the war being fired from the Coromandel. Rear-Admiral Michael Seymour, commander-in-chief of British forces in China, reported no British casualties and four or five Chinese killed due to an "ill-judged resistance". Afterwards, Seymour proceeded to Canton, where he found the Encounter moored off the city near the Canton Factories. He sent the Sampson and Barracouta to secure the free navigation of Blenheim Reach along the river. Both ships took possession of the Blenheim and Macao Forts without resistance. British sailor William Kennedy described the scene at the city:

The river was alive with every kind of craft, from the little sampan, propelled by a single oar in the stern, to the heavy trading junk with her single iron-wood mast and mat sails. Numerous flower-boats belonging to wealthy mandarins were moored off the town, conspicuous by their gaudy paint, and crowded with laughing girls, who kept up an incessant chatter as they peeped out at the foreign devils!

The next morning, Seymour proceeded down Macao Reach where he met the Barracouta. The Dutch Folly Fort opposite the factories and Bird's Nest Fort were taken quiet possession of, as were afterwards the two Shameen Forts commanding the passage. The captured guns were rendered unserviceable. A detachment of Royal Marines was landed to protect the factories, later reinforced by another party and some bluejackets (sailors). Advanced posts and field guns were stationed at the most important points, and barricades placed across the streets to guard against a surprise attack. On 25 October, Chinese forces attacked the pickets but were repulsed by the Marines with a loss of 14 Chinese killed and wounded. On 26 October, operations were temporarily halted, being a "day of rest" on Sunday.

At 1 pm on 27 October, the Encounter opened fire from its stern pivot at Governor Ye Mingchen's compound (yamen) in Canton, and continued until sunset at intervals of five to ten minutes. At the same time, the Barracouta in Sulphur Creek shelled the Chinese troops on the hills at the back of the city. The British warned the inhabitants within the vicinity to evacuate themselves and their property, which was done later that evening. On 28 October, the British resumed offensive operations from the Dutch Folly, where they placed two guns in position. The shelling of the city walls, aided by a conflagration of a large portion of houses in the line of attack, helped open a clear passage between the Dutch Folly and the city walls for further operations. The next morning, the British resumed firing earlier than expected after the Chinese mounted guns opposite the Dutch Folly. At 2 pm, a detachment of about 400 marines and seamen, aided by the Dutch Folly guns, breached the city wall. After blowing up one of the gates, they took possession of the city, and after inspecting the house and premises of the governor, re-embarked at sunset and retired to their respective quarters. Seymour reported that the Chinese troops offered little resistance "beyond a scattered fire from the streets and houses", from which two British were killed and twelve wounded.

== Aftermath ==
After receiving no concession from Commissioner Ye, the British re-opened fire on the morning of 30 October to maintain the breach. The bombardment continued daily to 5 November from the Encounter, Sampson, and Dutch Folly, targeting the government buildings in the city and the forts in the rear of it. After Chinese war junks gathered under the protection of the nearby French Folly Fort, the British captured the fort on 6 November.

== Gallery ==
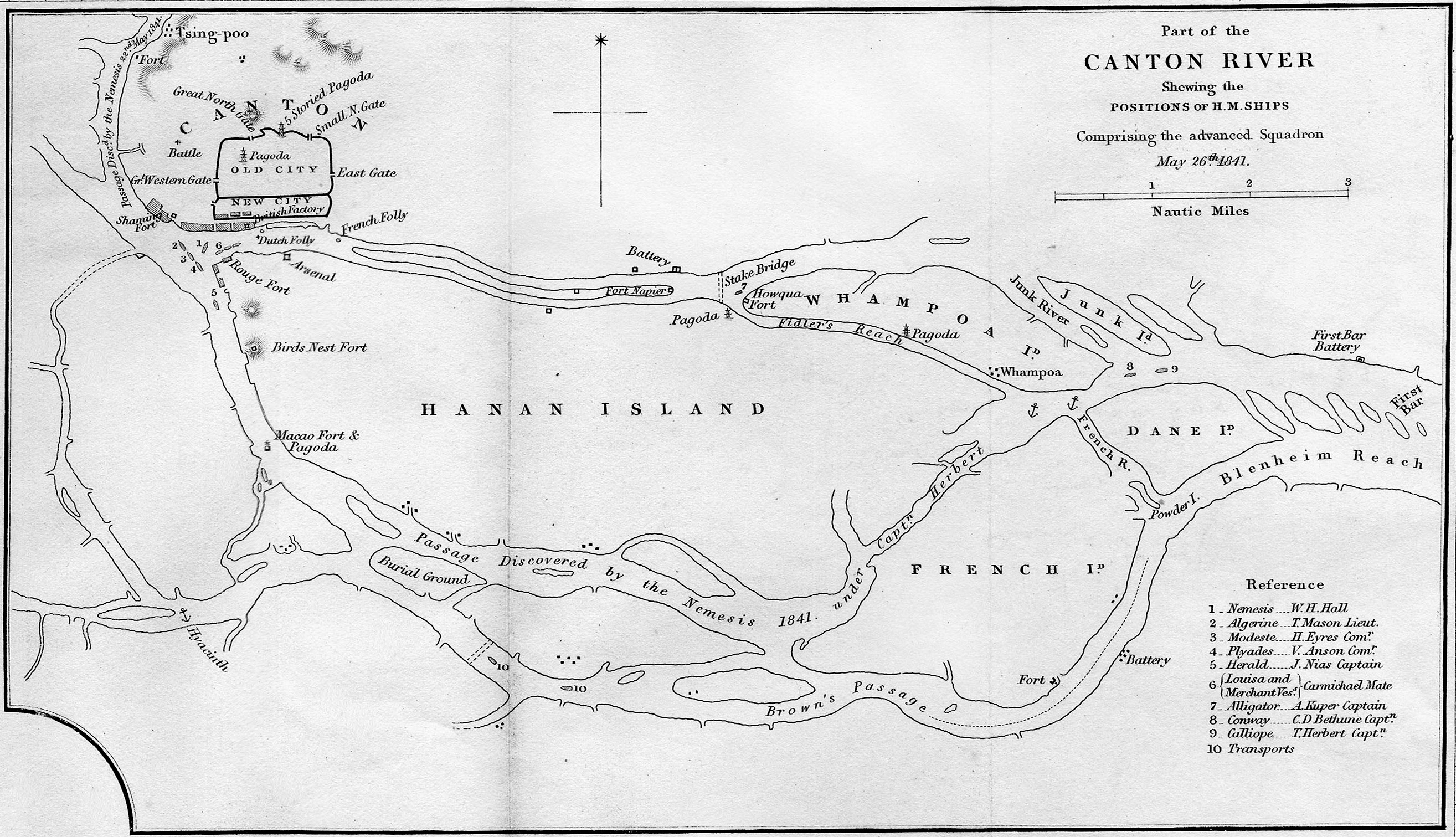
Map of the forts leading to Canton

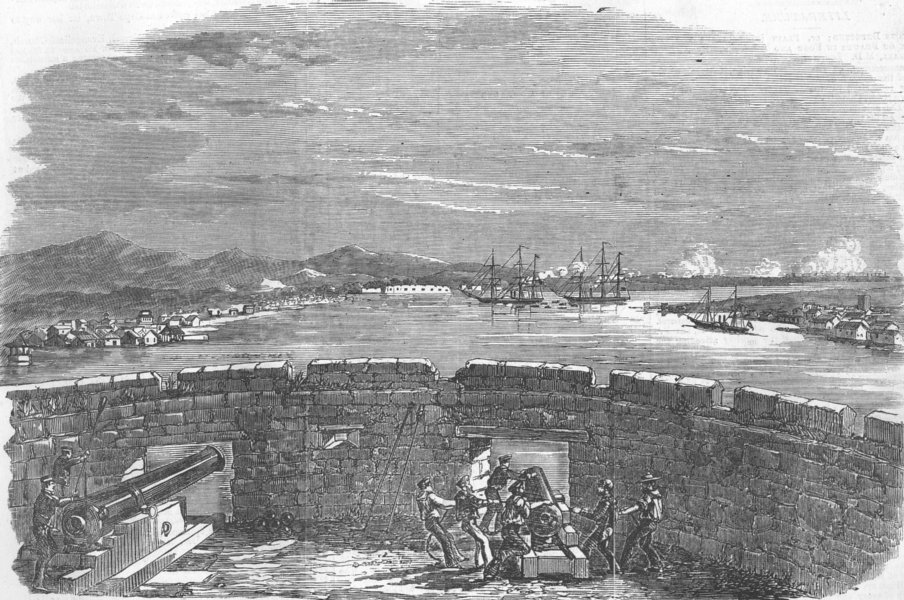
Interior of the Dutch Folly Fort

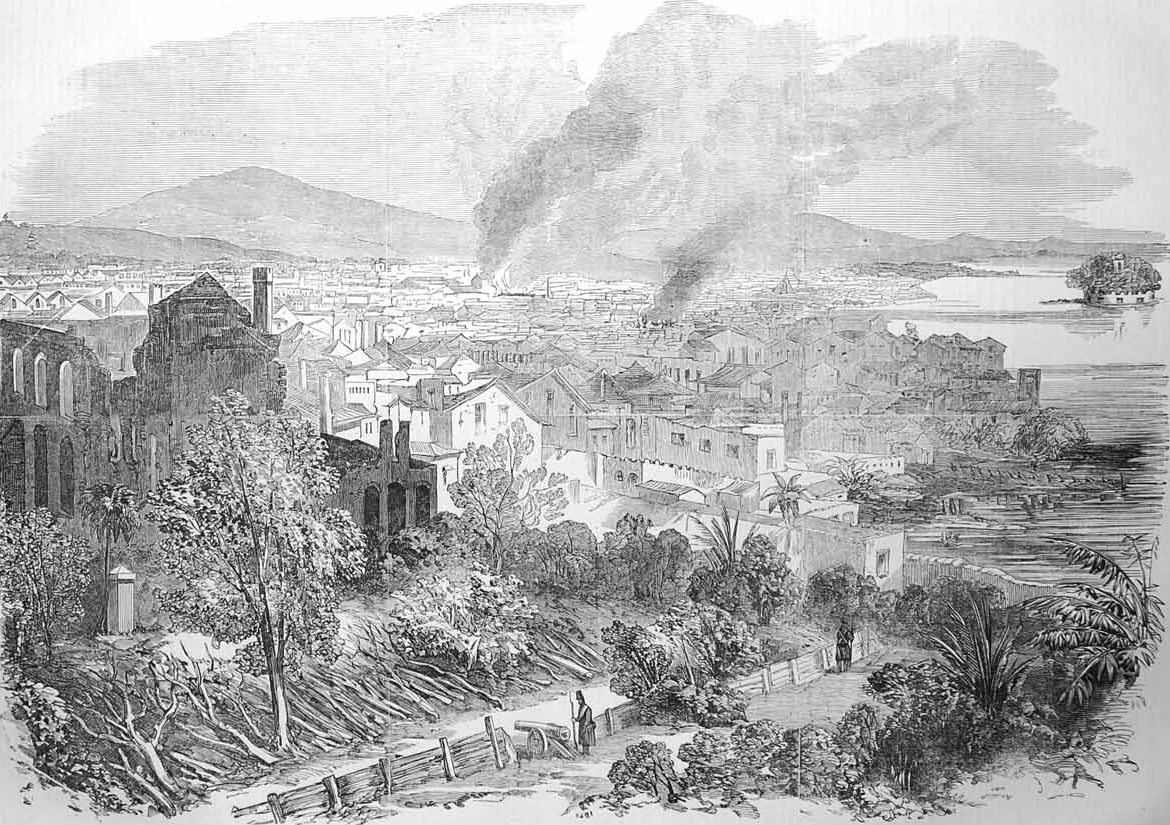
Conflagration in the city
