= Chen Qiyou =

Chinese revolutionary and politician

- 陈其尤
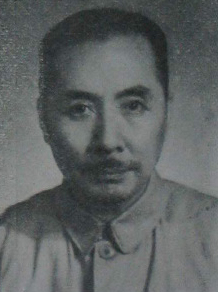

4th Chairperson of the China Zhi Gong Party
- In office 1950–1966
- Preceded by: Li Jishen
- Succeeded by: Huang Dingchen

Personal details
- Born: 1892 Haifeng County, Guangdong, China
- Died: 10 December 1970 (aged 77–78) Beijing, China
- Party: China Zhi Gong Party
- Education: Chuo University

Chinese name
- Chinese: 陈其尤
Transcriptions
Standard Mandarin
- Hanyu Pinyin: Chén Qíyóu
- Wade–Giles: ch`en^{2} ch`i^{2}yu^{2}

Chen Qiyou (Chinese: 陈其尤; pinyin: Chén Qíyóu, 1892 – 10 December 1970) was a Chinese revolutionary and politician with the China Zhi Gong Party. Born to a prominent family in Haifeng County, he became interested in efforts to overthrow the Qing dynasty as a teenager and joined the Tongmenghui in 1911. He participated in the Second Guangzhou Uprising and the assassination of Tartar-General Fengshan, then left for Japan to study politics and economics. In 1917, after returning to China and spending a year with the Ministry of Finance, he joined Sun Yat-sen's Constitutional Protection Junta as the secretary to General Chen Jiongming. In 1931, Chen joined the China Zhi Gong Party (ZG), with whom he served in various capacities for the rest of his life.

Chen was appointed to Hong Kong as a representative of the Kuomintang in 1937, but after he was imprisoned by the party, he began to write extensively against it and Generalissimo Chiang Kai-Shek. Following the end of the Second World War, Chen urged the ZG to support the Chinese Communist Party in its efforts to create a new Chinese government. He thereafter attended the first plenary session of the Chinese People's Political Consultative Conference in 1949, shortly thereafter taking a leadership role in the ZG. In the latter capacity, he was a member of the standing committees of the second, third, and fourth National People's Congresses.

== Biography ==
=== Early life ===
Chen Qiyou was born in Donghushe Village, part of Haifeng County, Guangdong, in 1892. (Note: Bartke (2012, p. 43) gives 1891.) The son of a prominent family, he attended a four-year school beginning in 1903. As a youth, he read The Revolutionary Army – a pamphlet by Zou Rong – and decided to dedicate himself to efforts to overthrow the Qing dynasty. At the age of seventeen, he enrolled at the Boji Medical College (now part of Sun Yat-sen University) in Guangzhou, where he was exposed to more revolutionary writings.

=== Revolutionary activities ===
Chen joined the Tongmenghui, an anti-Qing group, in 1911. At the time, the First Guangzhou Uprising had recently failed, and Sun Yat-sen was coordinating Tongmenghui members in preparation for a new revolution. Chen was removed from the city after the assassination of Tartar-General Fu Qi, as the government hunted potentially revolutionaries, but returned shortly thereafter and took office on Liantang Street. Prior to the Second Guangzhou Uprising, Chen provided armaments for such revolutionaries as Huang Xing and Zhu Zhixin. He was also tasked with attacking a training centre, though this was not launched as the uprising was crushed.

With the failure of the Second Guangzhou Uprising, the Qing government sought to eradicate the Tongmenghui in Guangzhou. Chen, having not been implicated in the uprising, was not removed, and continued preparing for revolution. This included assassinating the new tartar-general upon his arrival, for which Chen prepared with several other young revolutionaries. From Huang Xing, the group learned that Tartar-General Fengshan would arrive via ship on 25 October 1911 to take control of the military. Li Peiji (李沛基) was tasked with killing Fengshan with explosives; if he were to fail, Chen and fellow revolutionary Zhou Huipu (周惠普) would ambush Fengshan near the Li Renxuan Medical Clinic. Li was successful, killing Fengshan and his retinue.

In 1912, after the 1911 Revolution culminated in the declaration of the Republic of China and the deposal of the Qing, Chen left for Japan to study at Chuo University. (Note: Bartke (2012, p. 43) gives Waseda University.) He focused on politics and economics, with a particular interest in the Meiji Restoration and its consequences for Japan. Upon his graduation in 1916, Chen returned to China to take a job with the Ministry of Finance. This career was short-lived, however, as he left the ministry in 1917 to join Sun Yat-sen's Constitutional Protection Junta as the secretary to General Chen Jiongming. With the junta, Chen established two publications in Zhangzhou, the Minxing Daily and the Minxing Biweekly, and served as magistrate in Dongshan and Yunxiao counties. In 1927, Chen was present at the Battle of Huizhou.

=== China Zhi Gong Party and death ===
Chen joined the China Zhi Gong Party (ZG) in 1931. He attended the party's Second Congress in Hong Kong, being appointed to its Central Executive Committee. In 1935, Generalissimo Chiang Kai-shek – whom Chen had met prior to the Northern Expedition of the Kuomintang (KMT) – sent him to Hong Kong as a peacebroker; he was later given a formal appointment by the KMT in 1937. In this capacity, he accused David Kung Ling-kan of arms profiteering; he was subsequently imprisoned in the Xifeng concentration camp. (Note: Noting these accusations, Coble (2023, p. 59) writes that they were made by enemies of Kung and his wealthy father H. H. Kung.) Released in 1941, Chen moved to Chongqing, where he became familiar with the Chinese Communist Party through his schoolmate Huang Dingchen.

Also through Huang, Chen contacted other members of the ZG, who sought to curry the support of the overseas Chinese. In 1946, he left Chongqing for Hong Kong and reunited with fellow ZG members Chen Yansheng, Zhong Womei (钟沃梅), and Yan Xixuan (严锡煊). Working out of Chen Yansheng's home, the group prepared to reinvigorate the party and spread information about it. In the Hua Shang Daily, Chen published an article titled "Overview of the Zhi Gong Party", introducing the party to readers and reaffirming its commitment to the ideals of the 1911 Revolution and the War against Japan. For the Central Committee, Chen also announced the party's intent to hold a new congress in the coming year. In 1947, Chen was made deputy chairman of the ZG during the party's third national congress.

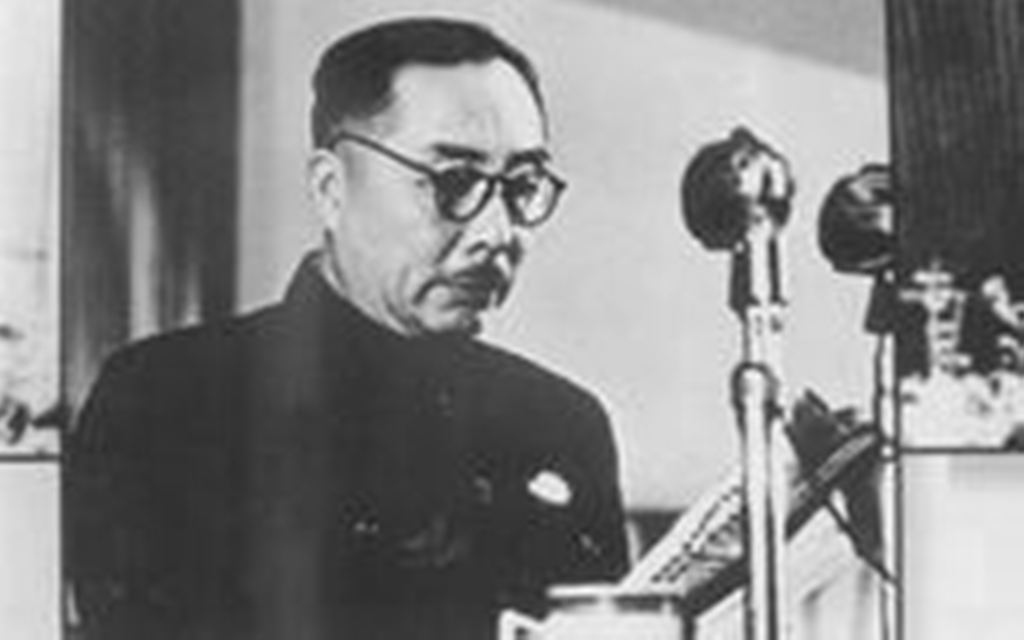
Chen speaking at the first plenary session of the Chinese People's Political Consultative Conference, 1949

Chen urged the ZG to ally with the Chinese Communist Party and its People's Democratic United Front; and in this capacity he sent a telegram acknowledging the ZG's interest in attending a joint consultative conference. In the meanwhile, he established Public Opinion (公论), a publication that was used to espouse ZG's ideals and decry the Chiang government. With fellow party members, he furtively made his way north in December 1948, participating in a planning session for the joint consultative conference in June 1949. In September, he attended the inaugural Chinese People's Political Consultative Conference, delivering a speech that urged the overseas Chinese to return to the mainland and help build the country.

In 1950, during the ZG's Fourth National Congress, Chen was elected to the presidium. He was elected chairman in November 1952, during the Fifth National Congress, and re-elected in April 1956. He represented the ZG in several national organizations, serving as a member of the standing committees of the first, second, and third National People's Congresses. He was also a member of numerous committees, including the Chinese Committee for World Peace, the Sino-Soviet Friendship Association, and the Afro–Asian Solidarity Committee. In 1956, he was part of a delegation that travelled to the Soviet Union, Romania, and Czechoslovakia. Chen died in Beijing on 10 December 1970. He had four sons, Shouren (守仁), Shouqin (守勤), Shouxin (守信), and Weili (维礼).

== Legacy ==
China Post issued a commemorative stamp depicting Chen on 25 February 1994. In December 2012, the ZG held a special symposium to commemorate the 120th anniversary of Chen's birth. Speaking to the symposium, Chairman Wan Gang described Chen as having made "immortal contributions to the development and construction of the China Zhi Gong Party, the cause of the liberation of the Chinese nation, and the cause of socialist construction", (Note: Original: ｢为中国致公党的发展和建设，为中华民族解放事业和社会主义建设事业立下了不朽的功勋｣.) thereby exemplifying adaptiveness and the pursuit of truth.

== Works cited ==
- Bartke, Wolfgang (2012). Who Was Who in the People's Republic of China: With More than 3100 Portraits. Walter de Gruyter. ISBN 978-3-11-096823-1.
- 陈其尤 [Chen Qiyou] (in Chinese). Haifeng County Municipal Government. 6 June 2020.
- 陈其尤 [Chen Qiyou] (in Chinese). China Zhi Gong Party.
- 陈其尤：致力为公追求真理的卓越民主人士 [Chen Qiyou: An Outstanding Democrat Dedicated to Pursuing Truth for the Public]. Shanwei Daily (in Chinese). 13 December 2020.
- Coble, Parks M. (2023). "Hyperinflation and the Rivalry between T. V. Soong and H. H. Kung". The Collapse of Nationalist China. pp. 41–79. doi:10.1017/9781009297639.003. ISBN 978-1-009-29763-9.
- Cui Jing (崔静) (2 December 2012). 致公党举行座谈会纪念陈其尤诞辰120周年 [Zhi Gong Party Holds Symposium to Commemorate the 120th Anniversary of Chen Qiyou's Birth] (in Chinese). Xinhua News Agency.
- Lamb, Malcolm (2003). Directory of Officials and Organizations in China. M.E. Sharpe. ISBN 978-0-7656-1020-1.
- McKenna, Amy (3 October 2023). "Chinese Revolution 1911–1912". Encyclopaedia Britannica. Archived from the original on 14 February 2024.
- Song Yuzhi (宋淯知) (5 September 2018). 陈其尤：其心昭昭 致公情尤 [Chen Qiyou: His Heart is Clear and His Love for the Public is Strong]. China Children's Press (in Chinese) – via Xinhai Revolution Network.
- Wang Fuyong (王付永) (4 August 2011). 陈其尤：致力为公 追求真理 [Chen Qiyou: Dedicated to Pursuing Truth for the Public Good]. Shenzhen Special Zone Daily (in Chinese) – via Xinhai Revolution Network.
