= Harry Parkes (diplomat) =

British diplomat

Sir Harry Parkes
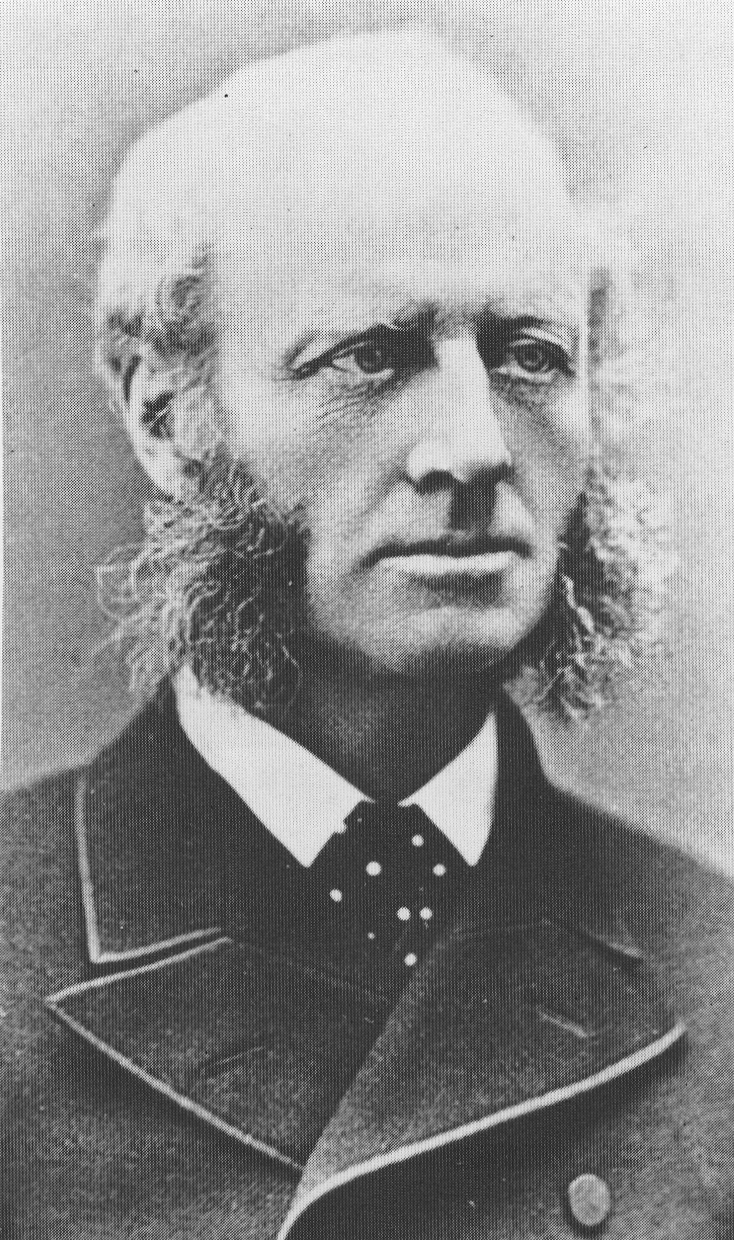

Envoy Extraordinary and Minister Plenipotentiary and Consul General of the United Kingdom to Japan
- In office 1865–1883
- Monarch: Queen Victoria
- Preceded by: Sir Rutherford Alcock
- Succeeded by: Sir Francis Richard Plunkett

Envoy Extraordinary and Minister Plenipotentiary and Consul General of the United Kingdom to China
- In office 28 September 1883 – 22 March 1885
- Monarch: Queen Victoria
- Preceded by: Thomas George Grosvenor
- Succeeded by: Sir Nicholas Roderick O'Conor

Minister to Korea
- In office 1884–1885
- Monarch: Queen Victoria
- Preceded by: none
- Succeeded by: Sir John Walsham

Personal details
- Born: Harry Smith Parkes; 24 February 1828 Birchill Hall, Bloxwich, Staffordshire, England
- Died: 22 March 1885 (aged 57) Beijing, China

Sir Harry Smith Parkes GCMG KCB (24 February 1828 – 22 March 1885) was a British diplomat who served as Envoy Extraordinary and Minister Plenipotentiary and Consul General of the United Kingdom to the Empire of Japan from 1865 to 1883 and the Chinese Qing Empire from 1883 to 1885, and Minister to Korea in 1884. Parkes Street in Kowloon, Hong Kong is named after him.

== Early life ==
Parkes was born in Birchill Hall in the parish of Bloxwich in Staffordshire, England. His father, Harry Parkes, was the founder of Parkes, Otway & Co., ironmasters. His mother died when he was four, while his father was killed in a carriage accident in the following year. He lived with his uncle, a retired naval officer, in Birmingham and was educated at a boarding school in Balsall Heath before entering King Edward's School, Birmingham in May 1838.

== Career in China (1841–64) ==
=== First Opium War ===
In June 1841, Parkes sailed to China to live with his cousin, Mary Wanstall, who was also the wife of the German missionary Karl Gützlaff. Upon arriving in Macau in October 1841, he prepared for employment in the office of John Robert Morrison, a translator of Sir Henry Pottinger, who was then the British envoy and plenipotentiary and superintendent of British trade in China. Around this time, the First Opium War (1839–42) was being fought between the British and the Qing Empire of China.

Parkes learnt the basics of the Chinese language and joined Morrison in Hong Kong in May 1842. On 13 June, he accompanied Pottinger on an expedition up the Yangtze River to Nanjing. He witnessed the Battle of Chinkiang, the last major battle of the First Opium War, on 21 July. He was also present at the signing of the Treaty of Nanking on board HMS Cornwallis on 29 August.

=== As a translator and then a consul ===
Between September 1842 and August 1843, Parkes served as a clerk under Karl Gützlaff, who was appointed as a civil magistrate in Zhoushan after the British occupied the island. In August 1843, he passed the consular examination in Chinese in Hong Kong and was appointed as a translator in Fuzhou in the following month. However, as there was a delay in the opening of Fuzhou port, he was instead reassigned to serve at the consulate in Canton and as an assistant to the Colonial Secretary of Hong Kong.

In June 1844, Parkes was appointed as a translator in Amoy. In March 1845, he and Rutherford Alcock (the British consul in Amoy) were transferred to Fuzhou, where they were attacked on 4 October by Chinese soldiers, who threw stones at them. In June 1846, he assisted Alcock in securing $46,163 from the Chinese authorities in Fujian as compensation for British property looted and destroyed during a riot.

In August 1846, Parkes and Alcock were transferred to Shanghai, where Parkes continued to serve as Alcock's translator. He started studying the Japanese language in the following year. In March 1848, he accompanied the British vice-consul in Shanghai to Nanjing to negotiate the punishment of the Chinese men who assaulted three British missionaries in Qingpu, Shanghai. He was appointed as a translator in Shanghai on 9 April 1848. After taking a period of leave from 1850–51 in Europe, he returned to China and continued his service as a translator in Amoy – an appointment he assumed in July 1849. He was reassigned to Canton again on 21 November 1851 and travelled there in February in the following year. While he was in Canton, he served as an acting Consul during Sir John Bowring's absence. In August 1853, he was temporarily placed in charge of the British vice-consulate in Canton.

Parkes was appointed as the British consul in Amoy in 1854. In 1855, he accompanied Bowring to Siam as a joint secretary of the diplomatic mission to conclude a commercial treaty between the British and Siamese. The treaty, known as the Bowring Treaty, was signed in Bangkok on 18 April. Parkes then returned to Britain with the Bowring Treaty for it to be ratified by the British government. He delivered it on 1 July and was received by Queen Victoria on 9 July. He spent the rest of the year helping the Foreign Office with Chinese and Siamese business. He exchanged the ratified Bowring Treaty in Bangkok on 5 April 1856 and arrived in Canton in June to serve as the acting British consul during Alcock's absence.

=== Second Opium War ===
==== Outbreak of war ====
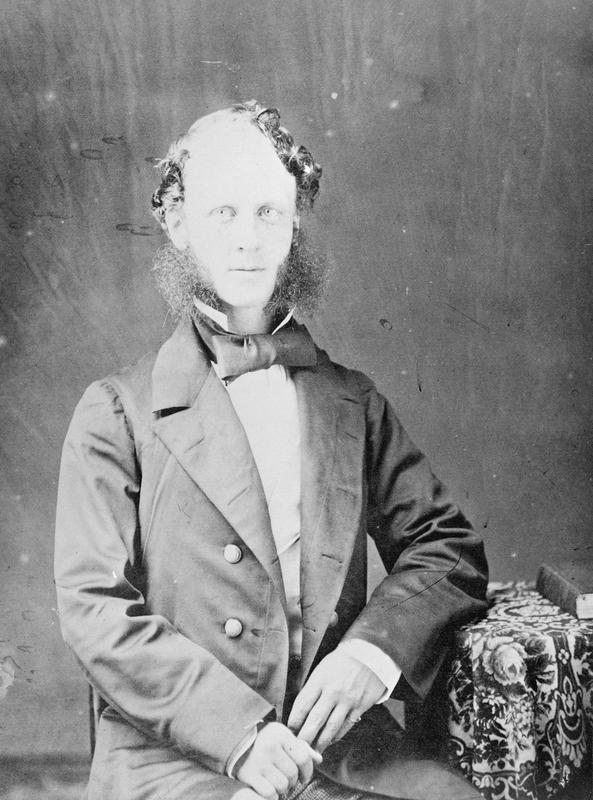
Parkes during the Second Opium War 1856-1860 Q70023

Parkes's position as the acting British Consul in Canton brought him into renewed contact with Ye Mingchen, the Qing-appointed Imperial Commissioner and Viceroy of Liangguang. Conflict between them eventually led to the outbreak of the Second Opium War (1856–60).

On 8 October 1856, the Chinese-owned lorcha Arrow was boarded by officials from the Qing water patrol when she entered Canton Harbour, on the Pearl River, after they received intelligence that several pirates were on board. They arrested 12 Chinese sailors, leaving two behind to look after the vessel. Following the account of the ship's captain, a twenty-one-year-old Irishman called Thomas Kennedy, Parkes alleged that the Red Ensign had been flying on the ship's mast at the time, and protested to Ye against its removal, which would have represented an insult to Britain. Ye replied that Arrow was owned and crewed by Chinese sailors and that the flag had not been flying at the time. Parkes persisted with his allegation of an insult to the British flag, which he considered a violation of British treaty rights and reported to Sir John Bowring, the Governor of Hong Kong.

Subsequent scholarship has established discrepancies in Parkes's account of the alleged insult to the British flag. First, the ship's papers were still in his possession at the time of the incident, meaning that it would have been illegal for the Arrow to leave port. British captains were obliged to give their papers to the consul when they arrived and were not permitted to leave until they had retrieved them, with the proper stamps. If the Arrow had not been about to leave port, there would have been no reason for her colours, under ordinary circumstances, to be up. Parkes alleged that the incident took place at 8:30 am, at which time the British consulate at Canton would not have been scheduled to open for another hour and a half. Further, Captain Kennedy admitted in his deposition to Parkes of 9 October 1856 that he had been breakfasting in another vessel called the Dart at the time of the incident, an account that his fellow diners, John Leach and Charles Earl, corroborated. Unmooring the boat while Kennedy was not on board would have meant leaving without him. According to a local newspaper, the master and crew of a nearby Portuguese lorcha corroborated Chinese officers' account that no flags had been flying on the Arrow when it was boarded by the marine police.

Parkes demanded that Ye release the detained sailors immediately and apologise for the alleged insult to the British flag. Although the British right to enter Canton had been established under the Treaty of Nanking in 1842, it had previously been denied. Bowring saw the Arrow incident as an opportunity to enforce this right. The deliberate escalation of the incident into a war had the object of forcing the removal of Britain's obstacles to trade and diplomacy in Canton.

Because Ye refused to capitulate despite minor reprisals, the Royal Navy breached Canton's walls on 29 October, after which Parkes accompanied Admiral Sir Michael Seymour in entering Ye's administrative office. The British did not have sufficient troops to permanently occupy Canton, but they kept warships on the Pearl River and positioned their artillery to overlook the city. On 16 December, Qing forces set fire to the European settlement outside the city. Parkes retreated to Hong Kong and spent nearly a year there. During this period of time, he was severely criticised in Parliament. On 26 February 1857, Lord Malmesbury said in the House of Lords, "If it were not for the serious consequences involved in this matter, I do not know that I have ever met anything which I should consider more grotesque than the conduct of Consul Parkes throughout these transactions."

==== Battle of Canton ====
British reinforcements assembled in Hong Kong in November 1857 in preparation for war against the Qing Empire under the direction of Lord Elgin, who had been appointed as the British High Commissioner and Plenipotentiary to China. The British acted in coordination with the French, who were also drawn into the Second Opium War over the death of Auguste Chapdelaine, a French missionary in China. Parkes, who was attached to Admiral Seymour's staff, was part of the group of Anglo-French representatives who delivered an ultimatum to the Qing officials on 12 December. When the ultimatum expired, the British and French bombarded Canton on 28 December and conquered the city by late December. Parkes hunted Ye Mingchen through the streets of Canton; George Wingrove Cooke reported that Parkes took special pleasure in humiliating Ye. "Ye was my game," said Parkes, and finally found what a report called "a very fat man contemplating the achievement of getting over the wall at the extreme rear" of the administrative office.

On 9 January 1858, Bogui was nominally reinstated by the Qing government as the Governor-General of Canton, but the city was actually governed by a European commission of two Englishmen (one of whom was Parkes) and a French naval officer. Parkes was the leader of the trio because he was the only one among them who could speak Chinese. The commission established a court, administered a police force, and opened the port on 10 February. Even though the Treaty of Tianjin was signed on 26 June, the Qing authorities in Guangdong remained hostile towards Europeans in Canton throughout 1858. They even mobilised militias and placed a large bounty on Parkes's head. Parkes was made a Companion of the Order of the Bath (CB) by Queen Victoria on 6 December 1859.

==== Beijing campaign ====
On 25 June 1859, with the British attack on the Taku Forts by the Hai River in Tianjin hostilities between the Anglo-French and Qing sides resumed. On 6 July, Parkes was requested to join Lord Elgin in the Bohai Sea. He sailed on 21 July and was appointed as Lord Elgin's Chinese secretary alongside Thomas Francis Wade.

On 1 August 1860, as an attaché to General James Grant, Parkes was sent to Beitang, Tianjin to take possession of the evacuated fort and perform some reconnaissance during the advance to the Taku Forts. After the successful assault on the main north fort on 21 August, he assisted in the negotiations for the surrender of the remaining Chinese positions in the forts. Three days later, he arrived in Tianjin, where he arranged for provisions for the Anglo-French forces and had meetings with the Qing imperial commissioners. Upon learning that the imperial commissioners did not hold plenipotentiary powers from the Xianfeng Emperor as they initially believed, the British and French troops then advanced further towards Tongzhou near the Qing capital, Beijing (romanized as "Peking" at the time).

Parkes and a delegation – whose members included Henry Loch (Lord Elgin's private secretary) and Thomas William Bowlby (a journalist for The Times) – travelled ahead of the Anglo-French army to negotiate with the Qing officials in Tungchow on 14 and 17 September. After some negotiations, they managed to secure an agreement that the Anglo-French army should move to a position about 5 mi (8.0 km) away from Tungchow. On 18 September, he left Tungchow to mark out the site of the proposed British encampment, but returned to remonstrate with the Qing officials when he saw a Qing military force assembling at the site. After receiving a hostile response, he and the delegation attempted to head back to the British headquarters, but were arrested by Qing soldiers under the command of the general Sengge Rinchen. Following his capture, Parkes was escorted to Beijing along with Loch, Nal Singh (a Sikh sowar), and two French soldiers. In Beijing, he and Loch were taken to the Ministry of Justice (or Board of Punishments), where they were incarcerated and tortured.

On 29 September, as ordered by Prince Gong (the Xianfeng Emperor's brother), Parkes and Loch were transferred out of the prison to more comfortable living quarters in a temple, where they were pressured to intervene in the negotiations between the Anglo-French and Qing sides. Parkes refused to make any pledges or address any representations to Lord Elgin. On 8 October, Parkes, Loch and six other members of the delegation were released from captivity – just shortly before the Qing government received an order from the Xianfeng Emperor, who was taking shelter in the Chengde Mountain Resort, for their executions. On 18 October, in retaliation for the torture and deaths of the other members of the delegation, Lord Elgin ordered the British and French troops to burn down the Qing Empire's Old Summer Palace in the northwest of Beijing.

=== Post-Second Opium War events ===
Following the signing of the Convention of Peking on 18 October 1860, Parkes returned to his post in Canton in January 1861 and managed the cession of Kowloon, Hong Kong to the Crown. The Treaty of Tianjin had opened the three Chinese port cities of Zhenjiang, Jiujiang and Hankou to foreign trade. Between February and April 1861, Parkes accompanied Vice-Admiral Sir James Hope on an expedition along the Yangtze River to set up consulates at the three cities and attempt to reach an agreement with the Taiping rebels at Nanjing.

Parkes returned to Beijing in April 1861 but left for Nanjing again in June for further meetings with the Taiping rebel leaders. On 21 October, the British and French returned the control of Canton to the Qing government, thereby ending Parkes's duties as the British commissioner in Canton. Parkes travelled to Shanghai in November and met up with the Taiping rebels again in Ningbo in December. In January 1862, he returned to England, where stories about his brief captivity in China during the Second Opium War had made him famous. On 19 May 1862, Queen Victoria made him a Knight Commander of the Order of the Bath (KCB) for his services. Parkes left England in January 1864 and arrived on 3 March in Shanghai, where he assumed the position of consul which he was previously appointed to on 21 December 1858. He was elected President of the North China Branch of the Royal Asiatic Society in 1864, resuscitating the moribund society.

== Career in Japan (1865–83) ==
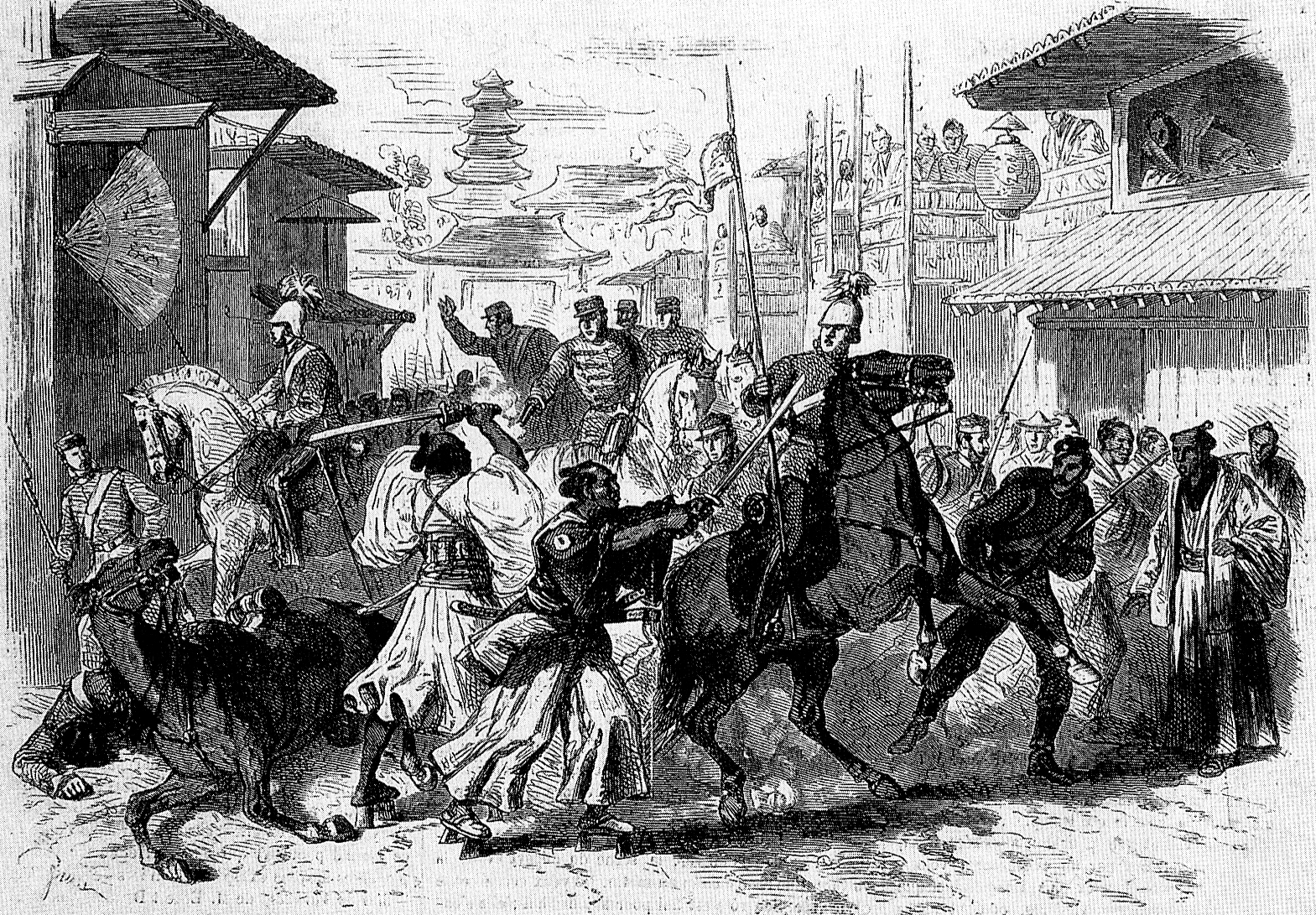
Attack on the delegation of Sir Harry Smith Parkes to the Meiji Emperor, 23 March 1868.

In May 1865, during a trip to the Yangtze ports, Parkes received a notification for him to succeed Sir Rutherford Alcock as "Her Majesty's Envoy Extraordinary and Minister Plenipotentiary and Consul-General in Japan". One of his tasks was to ensure the approval of the Imperial Court in Kyoto for the Anglo-Japanese Friendship Treaty of 1854 and the Anglo-Japanese Treaty of Amity and Commerce of 1858.

During this turbulent Bakumatsu period, Parkes pursued a policy of neutrality between the Tokugawa shogunate and the pro-Imperial forces, hoping for a peaceful resolution to the crisis. Due to his support for the reformers, he was marked and treated with bitter hostility by the reactionaries, who attempted to assassinate him on three separate occasions. The overthrow of the shogunate and the subsequent Boshin War caught him by surprise, but he continued the policy of British neutrality. On 22 May 1868 he presented his credentials to Emperor Meiji, thus making Great Britain the first foreign power to officially recognize the new Meiji government.

Throughout his 18 years in office, Parkes was instrumental in bringing a large number of British foreign advisors to train the Imperial Japanese Navy and to build modern infrastructure, such as lighthouses, a telegraph system and a railway between Tokyo and Yokohama.

He ran the British mission in a way that encouraged the junior members to research on, and study, Japan in greater depth. Ernest Satow and William George Aston benefited from this to become prolific scholars of Japanese studies.

While in Japan, Parkes's wife became known, in 1867, as the first non-Japanese woman to ascend Mount Fuji. She fell ill and died in London in November 1879 while making preparations for her family to come home. Although he was summoned urgently by telegraph, Parkes did not manage to reach London until four days after her death. He wrote to Frederick Victor Dickins, "She hoped to the last that I should have reached in time. I have now six children to take charge of, and feebly indeed shall I replace her in that charge, while the Legation will have lost that bright and good spirit to which it owed whatever attention it possessed."

=== Japanese paper report and collection ===
In 1869, Prime Minister William Gladstone requested a report on washi (Japanese paper) and papermaking from the British embassy in Japan. Parkes and his team of consular staff conducted a thorough investigation in different towns, and then published a government report, Reports on the manufacture of paper in Japan, and produced a collection of over 400 sheets of handmade paper. The main parts of this collection are housed in the Paper Conservation Laboratory of the Victoria and Albert Museum, and the Economic Botany Collection of the Royal Botanic Gardens, Kew. In 1879, Kew sent duplicate samples to Glasgow, Sydney, Melbourne and Adelaide, but these have been lost. The Parkes paper collection is important because the origin, price, manufacturing method and function of each paper was precisely documented.

== Career in Korea (1883–84) ==
Having represented the British in the negotiations leading to a treaty of "Friendship, Commerce and Navigation," signed in the Kyongbok Palace in Seoul on 26 November 1883, Parkes was appointed as the British Minister to Korea in 1884. The new treaty came into force in April 1884, when Parkes returned to Seoul to exchange ratifications.

== Death ==
Parkes died of malarial fever on 21 March 1885 in Beijing. On 8 April 1890, the Duke of Connaught unveiled a statue of Parkes at the Bund in Shanghai, where it stood until it was removed during the Japanese occupation of Shanghai in the Second Sino-Japanese War. There is a memorial to him in St Paul's Cathedral.

== Family ==
Parkes had a sister called Catherine; in 1841, she married the missionary doctor William Lockhart in Macau.

While in England, Parkes met Fanny Plumer, the granddaughter of Sir Thomas Plumer, the first Vice Chancellor of England, at the home of a mutual friend. "She was a beautiful girl," wrote a friend about her, "tall, well-proportioned, and graceful, her colouring rich and soft, her features expressing sensitiveness and the power of warm emotion; her dark brown eyes full of intelligence and speaking earnestness of purpose. She possessed in a large degree the power of fascination in which all her family were remarkable." After a six-week courtship, Parkes and Plumer were married on New Year's Day, 1856, in St Lawrence's Church, Whitchurch. The couple left England on 9 January.

Lady Fanny Parkes is noted for being the first non-Japanese woman, possibly the first woman, ever to scale Mount Fuji on 7 and 8 October 1867. She died of illness in October 1879.

Parkes's elder daughter, Marion Parkes, married James Johnstone Keswick from the Keswick family, the controllers of Jardine Matheson Holdings. His second daughter, Mabel Desborough Parkes, married Captain Egerton Levett, a Flag Lieutenant in the Royal Navy. She died after falling from her horse in 1890. A younger daughter, Lilian Hope Parkes, married in 1903 Rev. Rowland Francis Cobbold, formerly Chaplain of St John´s Cathedral, Hong Kong.

== Selected works ==
In a statistical overview derived from writings by and about Parkes, OCLC/WorldCat encompasses roughly 20 works in more than 30 publications in four languages and over 400 library holdings.

- Observations on Mr. P.P. Thoms' rendering of the Chinese word ... Man. (1852)
- File concerning Harry Parkes' mission to Bangkok in 1856 from the Archives of the Ministry of Foreign Affairs, London by Harry Parkes (1856)
- Papers, 1853–1872

== See also ==
- Thomas Blake Glover
- Anglo-Chinese relations
- Anglo-Japanese relations
- British Japan Consular Service
- List of Ambassadors from the United Kingdom to Japan
- List of Ambassadors from the United Kingdom to Korea
- List of Ambassadors from the United Kingdom to China
