= Capture of the French Folly Fort =

Coordinates: 23°6′48″N 113°16′53″E

Capture of French Folly Fort
- Part of the Second Opium War
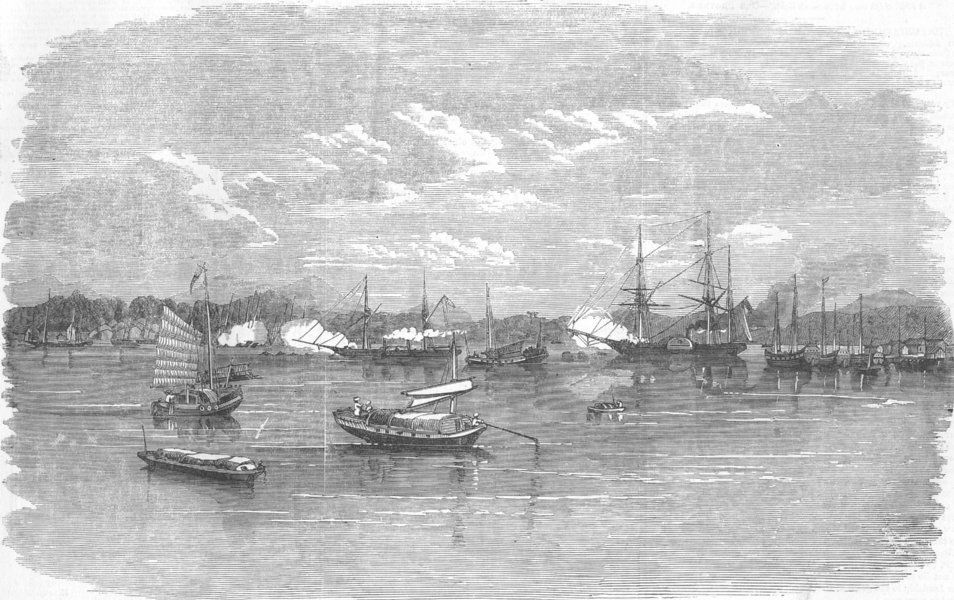
- Start of the action, showing the steamers Barracouta and Coromandel
Date	6 November 1856
Location	Pearl River, Guangdong, China
Result	British victory

Belligerents
United Kingdom	Qing China

Commanders and leaders
Michael Seymour	Ye Mingchen

Strength
2 steamers 14 small boats^{1}	23 junks

Casualties and losses
6 killed 15 wounded	Unknown; 1 fort captured
- ^{1} Comprising 2 launchers, 2 barges, 3 pinnaces, 6 cutters, and 1 gig

The Capture of the French Folly Fort by British forces in China occurred on 6 November 1856 during the Second Opium War. The British dispersed 23 Chinese war junks and captured the French Folly fort in the Pearl River near the city of Canton (Guangzhou) in Guangdong province. The battle lasted nearly an hour. The British consul Harry Parkes described the Chinese as putting up "a very hot resistance" and the engagement as "exceeding creditable to the bravery not only of our men, but of the Chinese also."

== Gallery ==
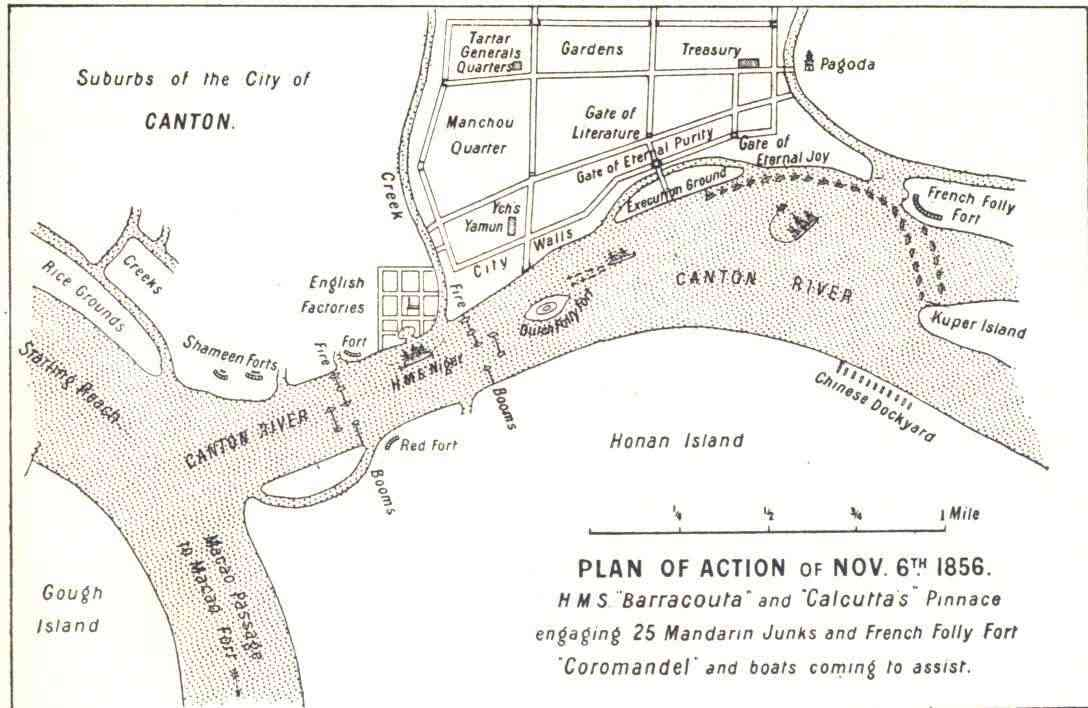
Map of the battle

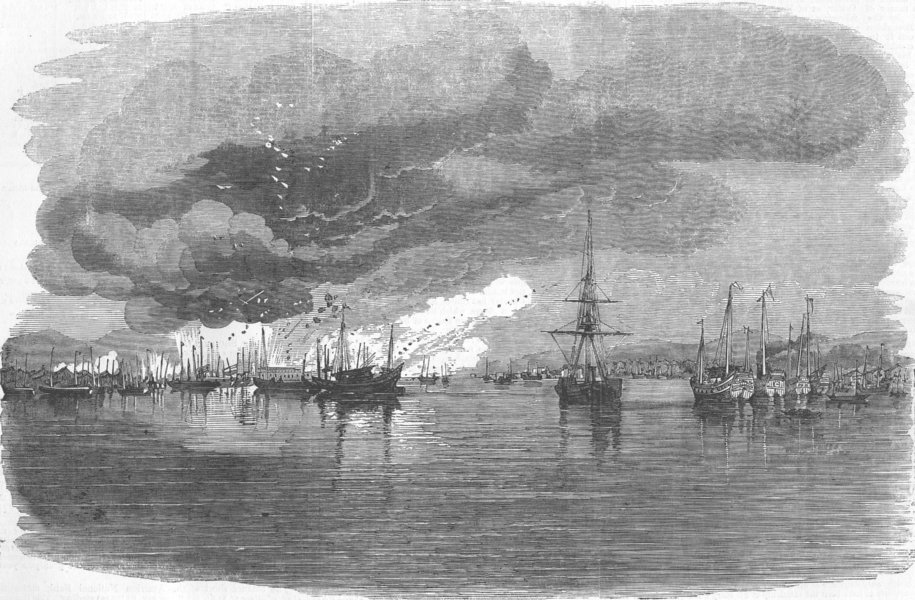
End of the action, showing the explosion of the junks

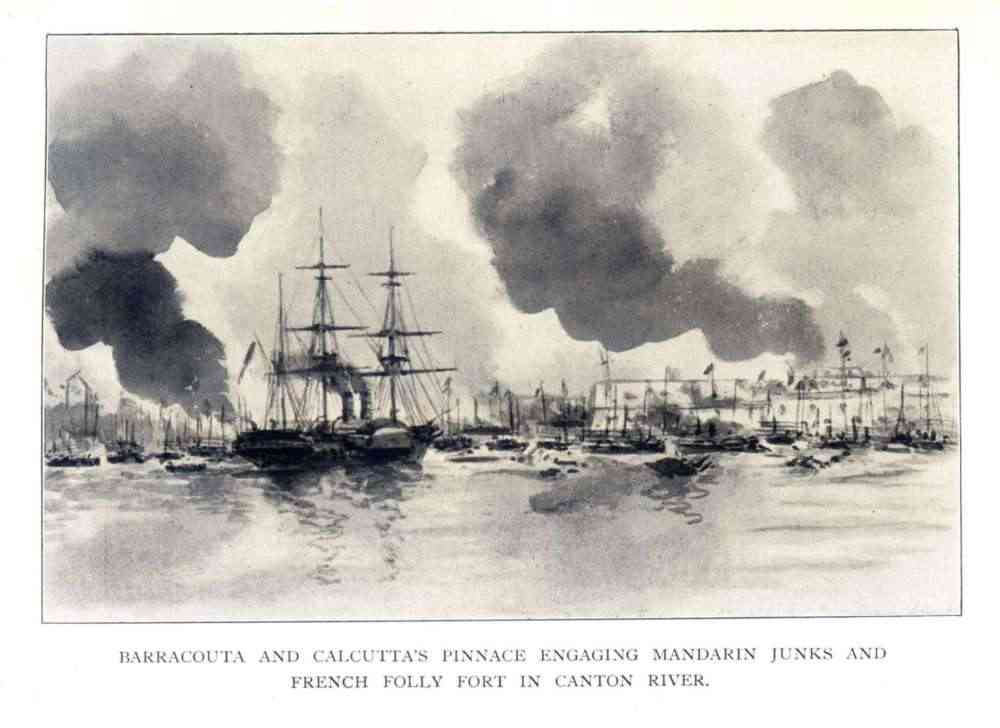
Barracouta and a pinnace from the Calcutta engaging junks

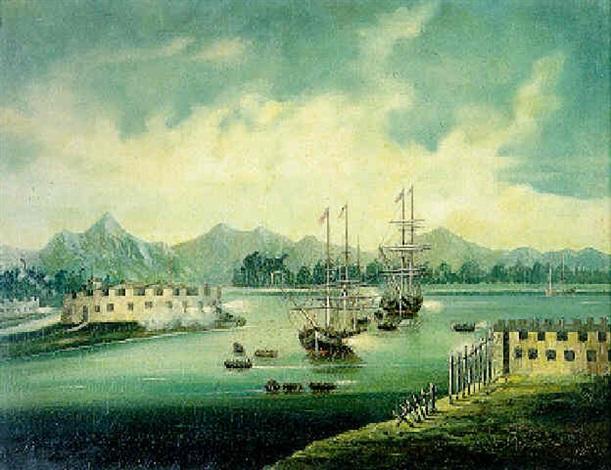
A battle at French Folly Fort by a Chinese painter

== Citations and references ==
Citations

References

- Bulletins and Other State Intelligence for the Year 1857. Part 1. London: Harrison and Sons. 1859.
- Papers Relating to the Proceedings of Her Majesty's Naval Forces at Canton. London: Harrison and Sons. 1857.
