= Battle of Huizhou =

Date	December 28, 1927 to January 4, 1928
Location	Huizhou, Guangdong
Result	11th Army victory

Belligerents
11th Army	4th Army

Commanders and leaders
Chen Mingshu	Miao Peinan

Strength
	~1,000+

Casualties and losses
	~1,000 captured

The Battle of Huizhou was fought between the 4th Army of Miao Peinan and the 11th Army of Chen Mingshu. Miao retreated to Huizhou after his defeat by Li Jishen at the Battle of Guangzhou. After his defeat, Miao retreated to his hometown of Wuhua, Guangdong. It was one of many internal conflicts within the Kuomintang in the aftermath of Chiang Kai-shek's successes in the Northern Expedition.

== Bibliography ==
- 中華民國國防大學編，《中國現代軍事史主要戰役表》
