= HMS Encounter (1846) =

Sloop of the Royal Navy

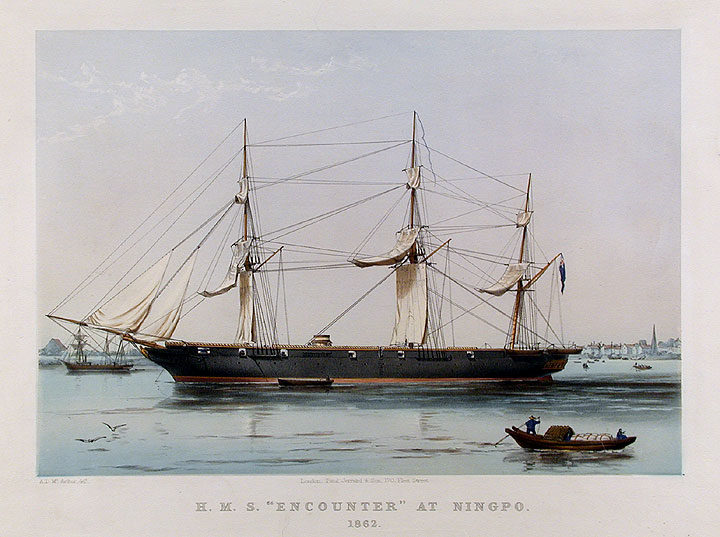
- HMS Encounter at Ningpo in China in 1862

History

United Kingdom
- Name: HMS Encounter
- Ordered: 5 February 1845
- Builder: Pembroke Dockyard
- Cost: £19,734 plus £20,192 for machinery and fitting
- Laid down: June 1845
- Launched: 5 September 1846
- Commissioned: 7 September 1849
- Honours and awards: Pacific 1854–55, China 1856-60, PEI-HO Forts 1859
- Fate: Broken up Devonport May 1866

General characteristics
- Class & type: Encounter-class sloop (reclassified as a corvette in 1862)
- Tons burthen: 894 40/94 tons original, lengthened 1848 953 bm
- Length: 180 ft (54.86 m) gundeck, 157 ft 7 in (48.03 m) keel for tonnage original, lengthened 1848 190 ft (57.91 m), 167 ft 10 in (51.16 m) keel for tonnage
- Beam: 33 ft 2 in (10.11 m) maximum, 32 ft 8 in (9.96 m) keel for tonnage
- Draught: 13 ft 11 in (4.24 m) mean
- Depth of hold: 20 ft 10 in (6.35 m)
- Installed power: 360 nhp; 673 ihp (502 kW)
- Propulsion: John Penn and Sons 2-cylinder horizontal single-expansion trunk steam engine; Single screw
- Sail plan: Full-rigged ship
- Speed: 10.2 knots (18.9 km/h)
- Complement: 180
- Armament: As built: 8 guns; 1 × 56-pounder (87 cwt) gun; 1 × 10-inch (85 cwt) gun; 4 × 8-inch/68-pounder (65 cwt) gun; 2 × 32-pounder (17 cwt) carronades; From 1850: 12 guns; 12 × 32-pounder muzzle-loading smoothbore guns; From 1856: 14 guns; 14 × 32-pounder muzzle-loading smoothbore guns

HMS Encounter was ordered as a First-Class Sloop with screw propulsion on 5 February 1845 to be built at Pembroke, in accordance with the design developed by John Fincham, Master Shipwright at Portsmouth. Her armament was to consist of 8 guns (2 × 85 cwt, 4 × 65 cwt and 2 × 25 cwt). She was to have a more powerful steam engine rated at 360 nominal horsepower. In 1848 she would be altered abaft and lengthened at Deptford prior to completion. A second vessel (Harrier) was ordered on 26 March 1846 but after her keel was laid at Pembroke Dockyard, her construction was suspended on 9 September 1846 then cancelled five years later, on 4 April 1851. Encounter had her armament radically altered in 1850 and she was broken up at Devonport in 1866.

Encounter was the third named vessel since its introduction for a discovery vessel in service in 1616.

Harrier was the fourth named ship since the name was introduced for a ‘Cruizer’ class fir built 18-gun brig sloop, launched by Barnard of Deptford on 22 April 1804 and foundered in the Indian Ocean in March 1809.

== Design and specifications ==
Encounter's keel was laid in June 1845 at Pembroke Dockyard and launched on 5 September 1846. Her gun deck was 180 ft (54.86 m) with her keel length reported for tonnage calculation of 157 ft 7 in (48.03 m). Her maximum breadth was 33 ft 2 in (10.11 m) though reported 32 ft 8 in (9.96 m) for tonnage. She had a depth of hold of 20 ft 10 in (6.35 m). Her builder’s measure tonnage was 894 tons. In 1848 her gun deck was lengthened at Deptford Dockyard to 190 ft (57.91 m) with her keel length reported for tonnage calculation of 167 ft 10 in (51.16 m). Her builder’s measured tonnage increased to 935 tons with a displacement of 1,194 tons.

Her machinery was supplied by John Penn & Company of Greenwich. She shipped two rectangular fire tube boilers. Her engine was a 2-cylinder horizontal single-expansion trunk (HSET) steam engine with cylinders of 55 in (1,397.00 mm) in diameter with a 27 in (685.80 mm) stroke, rated at 360 nominal horsepower (NHP). She had a single screw propeller of 12 ft (3.66 m) in diameter.

Her armament at commissioning in 1849 consisted of a single Dundas 1853 68-pounder muzzle-loading smoothbore (MLSB) of 95 hundredweight (cwt) 10-foot naval gun on a pivot mount, one 10-inch MLSB of 86 cwt shell 9-foot 4-inch shell gun on a pivot mount and four 8-inch 65 cwt MLSB 9-foot shell guns on broadside trucks. In 1850, the initial six guns were changed to two 8-inch 65 cwt MSLB 9-foot shell guns on pivot mounts, four Dundas 1853 68-pounder 85 cwt 10-foot MLSB solid shot guns plus two 32 pounder 25 cwt 6-foot MLSB solid-shot guns on broadside trucks. Later in 1850 six more 32-pounder guns were added. In 1856 another two 32-pounders were added.

=== Trials ===
During her full power steam trials her engine developed 673 indicated horsepower (IHP) for a speed of 10.254 knots.

She was completed for sea on 12 October 1849 at a first cost of - Hull 19,734 and machinery 20,192.

== Commissioned service ==
=== First commission ===
She was commissioned at Portsmouth on the 7th of September 1849 under Captain George T. Gordon, RN, for Particular Service. The Royal Navy ran a series of "Experimental Squadrons" during the 1830s and 1840s, with Encounter taking part in the 1851 event. The intention was to trial different types of vessels in a variety of sea and wind conditions, with the aim of building experience of the comparative characteristics of new ships. She paid off at Portsmouth on 15 September 1852.

=== Second commission ===
She was commissioned the next day, on 16 September 1852, under Captain George W.D. O’Callaghan for service at Portsmouth. For the Naval Review on the 10th of August 1853, she was in the port column, led by the new 91-gun, second rate, HMS Agamemnon (flying the flag of Rear Admiral Armar Lowry-Corry). HMS Encounter was the seventh ship in line as HRH Queen Victoria, on board the Royal Yacht Fairy, reviewed the ships prior to her departure for Osbourne House on the Isle of Wight.

She was assigned to the East Indies and China Station towards the end of 1853. Encounter took part in April 1854 in joint British-American operations against Chinese imperial troops in Shanghai with HMS Grecian and USS Plymouth. Imperial Chinese troops had begun assaulting foreigners, sacking warehouses, and exacting tolls on boats sailing up and down the Huangpu River. On 3 April, two British citizens were accosted by sword-wielding soldiers, and the British and US ships resolved to drive off the Chinese troops. Sixty US sailors and marines and 30 sailors from American merchant ships moved against the left flank of the Chinese entrenchments, while a force of 150 British sailors and marines, and additional "Shanghai volunteers," attacked on the right. Supported by gunfire from two privately owned field pieces and a howitzer, the Allied force routed the Chinese defenders, who "fled in great disorder, leaving behind them a number of wounded and dead."

With the outbreak of the Russian War, she was assigned to a squadron of four ships under the command of Vice-Admiral Sir James Stirling. Admiral Stirling, wishing to prevent Russian ships from sheltering in Japanese ports to interdict British merchant vessels, concluded the Anglo-Japanese Friendship Treaty with representatives of the Tokugawa Shogunate at Nagasaki in October 1854.

On 3 November 1854, Encounter's boats took part in attacks on pirates in the Macao River. Ten days later her boats attacked and captured a shore battery and destroyed junks in Coulan Bay.

On 1 June 1855, a squadron consisting of Encounter, Pique, Dido, Brisk, Barracouta and the French frigate Alceste entered the harbour of Petropavlovsk. They discovered that the Russian ships had sailed for the River Amur. On 3 June, Encounter, Barracouta and Pique sent armed boats to Rakouina Harbour to capture the Russian whaler Aian. On 7–8 June, the same three ships destroyed the batteries and magazines at Petropavlovsk.

On 7 October 1856, Encounter assisted in the refloating of the British merchant ship Inchinnan, which had been driven ashore at Shanghai on 4 September. The Second Opium War broke out on 8 October. Encounter was sent from Hong Kong up the Pearl River to Canton and on 27 October opened fire on selected targets in the city. On 12–13 November she took part in the bombardment and capture of the Bogue forts. On 4 December she took part in the capture of the French folly fort. British forces withdrew from Canton on 8 January 1857. A Parliamentary grant of £33,000 was given to be shared between 56 ships for services on the China Station between 1856 and 1858, in which the ship's company of Encounter shared.

She returned to Home Waters, paying off at Plymouth on 19 February 1858.

=== Third commission ===
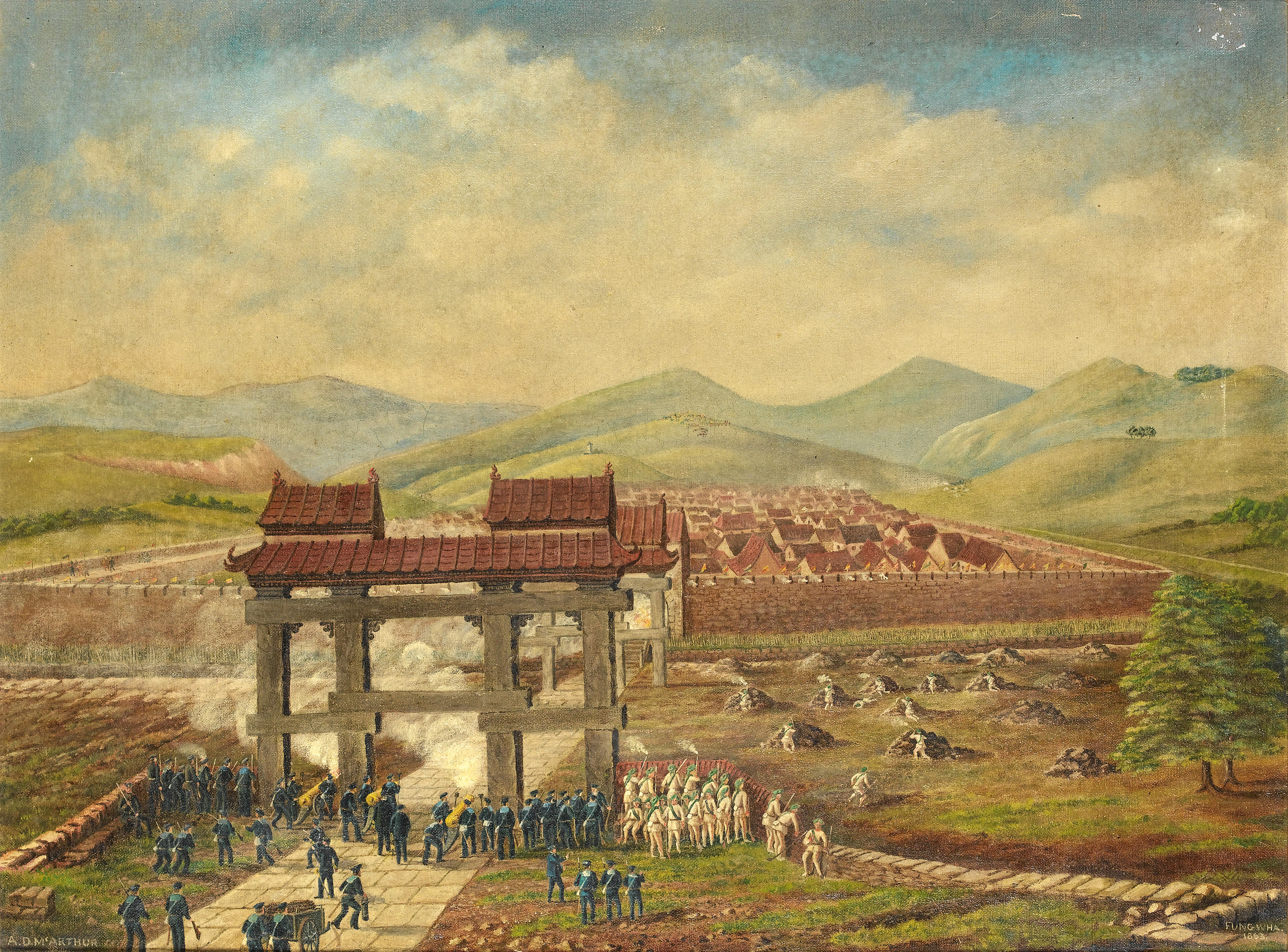
The attack on Fungwha, 9 October 1862. This image shows the bombardment of the East Gate of Ningpo by guns from HMS Encounter and Sphinx

Between February 1858 and September 1859, she refitted in Devonport. She was commissioned on 11 September 1859 under the command of Captain Robert Dew, RN, for service in the East Indies and China. During her voyage she escorted the gunboats Snap and Bouncer to China via Madeira, Rio de Janeiro and Singapore. Between 11 May and 15 December 1862, Encounter's commanding officer, Captain Roderick Dew, in charge of a squadron of French and English gunboats supported Chinese troops in action against rebel and pirate forces attacking the treaty ports. At the beginning of 1864 she was ordered to reyurn to Home Waters.

== Fate ==
She arrived on 21 July 1864 at Plymouth Sound, Encounter was paid off at Devonport on 3 August 1864. She was broken at Devonport in May 1866.
