= Charles van Straubenzee =

General Sir Charles van Straubenzee GCB
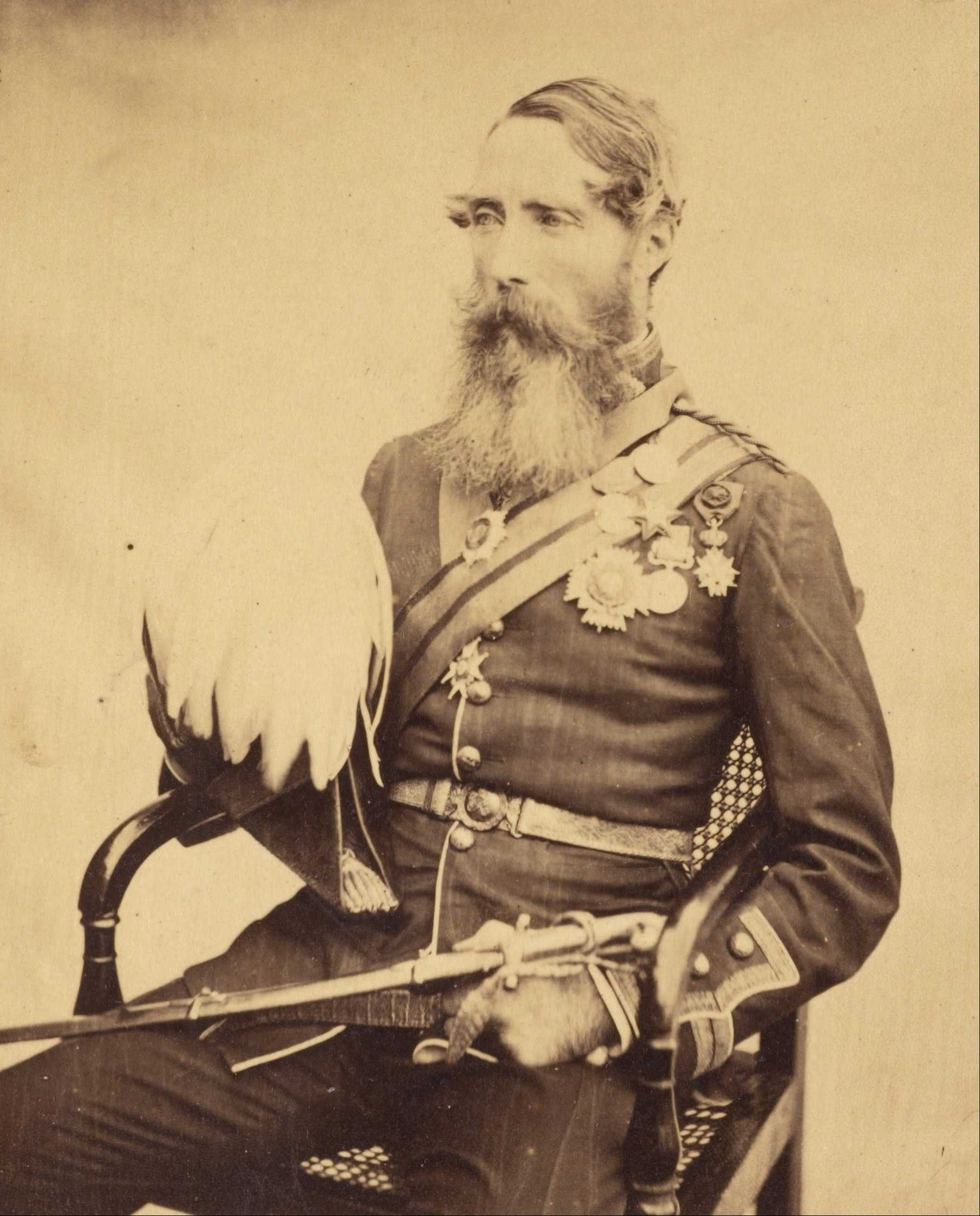
- Van Straubenzee as brigadier-general in 1860
- Born: 17 February 1812; Fort Ricasoli, Malta
- Died: 10 August 1892 (aged 80); Bath, Somerset, England
- Burial place: Smallcombe Cemetery
- Military career
- Allegiance: United Kingdom
- Branch: British Army
- Service years: 1828–1881
- Rank: General
- Commands: 3rd Bn the Buffs; 1st Brigade of the Light Division; Commander of British Troops in China and Hong Kong; Bombay Army; Malta
- Wars: Gwalior campaign Crimean War; Second Opium War
- Awards: Knight Grand Cross of the Order of the Bath

General Sir Charles Thomas van Straubenzee GCB (17 February 1812 – 10 August 1892) was a British Army officer. He served as Commander of British Troops in China and Hong Kong, and Governor of Malta.

== Military career ==
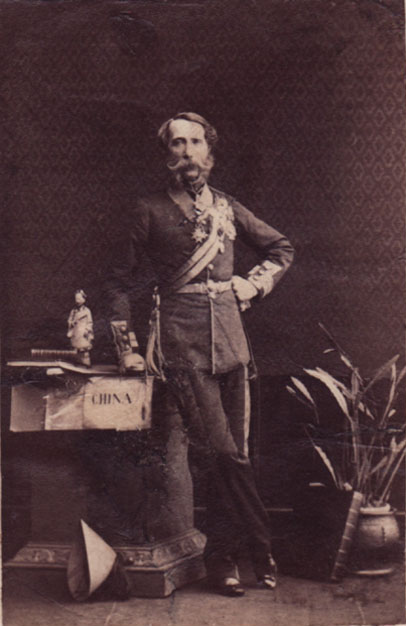
Van Straubenzee in 1861

Van Straubenzee was born at Fort Ricasoli, Malta, in 1812, as the second son of Thomas van Straubenzee (1782–1843), a Royal Artillery major, of Spennithorne, Yorkshire, and his wife Maria, youngest daughter of Major Henry Bowen.

A member of an old and distinguished military family, Van Straubenzee was commissioned into the Ceylon Rifle Regiment in 1828. He transferred to the 39th Regiment of Foot in 1833, and, during the Gwalior campaign, he took part in the Battle of Maharajpore in 1843; he took temporary command of his regiment when its commanding officer was wounded and brought the regiment out of action.

In 1846, he transferred to 3rd Battalion the Buffs of which he became commanding officer in 1851, and fought in the Crimean War commanding the 1st Brigade of the Light Division, and taking part in both assaults on the Redan during the Siege of Sevastopol.

In 1857, Van Straubenzee became Commander British Forces in Hong Kong and led an attack on Canton during the Second Opium War. In 1862, he was made general officer commanding a Division of the Bombay Army at Ahmedabad and subsequent took overall command of the Bombay Army.

He was colonel of the 47th Regiment of Foot from 1865 to 1867, and of the 39th Regiment of Foot from 1867, until they became part of the Dorset Regiment in 1881, after which he continued as colonel of the 2nd Battalion until 1892. Van Straubenzee became Governor of Malta in 1872.

Van Straubenzee is buried at St Mary the Virgin's Churchyard near Bath, Somerset.

== Family ==
He married Charlotte Louisa Richardson in 1841, daughter of General John Luther Richardson.

== See also ==
- List of British recipients of the Légion d'Honneur for the Crimean War

Military offices
Preceded by Thomas Ashburnham	Commander of British Troops in China and Hong Kong; 1858–1859	Succeeded by Sir James Grant
Preceded by Richard Lluellyn	Colonel of the 39th (Dorsetshire) Regiment of Foot; 1867–1881	Succeeded by Dorset Regiment
Preceded by James Shaw Kennedy	Colonel of the 47th (Lancashire) Regiment of Foot; 1865–1867	Succeeded by John Patton
Political offices
Preceded by Sir Patrick Grant	Governor of Malta; 1872–1878	Succeeded by Sir Arthur Borton
