= Chen Yansheng =

Chinese businessman (born 1970)

- Born: 1970 (age 55–56); Guangdong, China
- Occupation: Football club owner
- Organization: Espanyol; (2016–2025)

Chen Yansheng (Chinese: 陈雁升; born 1970) is a Chinese businessman who was the majority owner of Espanyol.

== Career ==
Chen founded Chinese toy manufacturer Rastar Group in 2000. In 2016, he became majority owner of Spanish La Liga side Espanyol. During his first year as majority owner, he invested approximately €150 million into the club. Subsequently, he sold Los Pericos in 2025 for approximately €130 million.

== Personal life ==
Chen was born in 1970 in Guangdong, China and is a native of Shantou, China. Married, he has a son.
