= Battle of Guangzhou =

Coordinates: 23°05′55″N 113°15′58″E

Date	December 18, 1927
Location	Guangzhou, Guangdong, China

Belligerents
Guangdong Army 8th Route Army	Opponents of Li Jishen

Commanders and leaders
Li Jishen	Miao Peinan

The Battle of Guangzhou was an internal conflict within the National Revolutionary Army in the aftermath of Chiang Kai-shek's successes in the Northern Expedition. It occurred shortly after the Chinese Communist Party-led Guangzhou Uprising, which was crushed by Li Jishen's opponent Zhang Fakui in December 1927. On December 29, 1927, Li Jishen's forces were able to capture Guangzhou, and Miao Peinan retreated to Huizhou. On December 29, 1927, local leader Li Fulin, an opponent of Li Jishen, was removed from office and replaced with Deng Yanhua.

== Bibliography ==
- 中華民國國防大學編，《中國現代軍事史主要戰役表》
