= William G. Beasley =

British academic and author (1919–2006)

William Gerald Beasley CBE FBA (22 December 1919 – 19 November 2006) was a British academic, author, editor, translator and Japanologist. He was Emeritus Professor of the History of the Far East at the School of Oriental and African Studies of London University.

== Early years ==
Beasley was born in Hanwell, Middlesex, to Helena May Chalk (1886–1962) and William Beasley (originally Beesley; 1882–1961), who was an actor who had spent the years of the First World War interned in a camp near Groningen, in the Netherlands. Owing to his father's work, he grew up in Aberdeen and in various towns in England, including Brackley, Northamptonshire, where he attended Magdalen College School on a scholarship. In 1937, he began his university studies of history at Westminster College, a teacher-training college attached to the University of London which moved to Oxford in 1959. On the outbreak of war, he, with many others arts students at London, was evacuated to Aberystwyth. In June 1940 he graduated and he was free to begin his military service.

== Wartime and postwar service ==
Beasley had expressed a preference for the Royal Navy and thus reported to Devonport on 4 November 1940 to join HMS Impregnable for his initial training as a telegraphist; he was the only graduate amongst the men on the course. In January 1941 he was recommended for a commission and in preparation was assigned to the destroyer HMS Tartar as an ordinary seaman. In May 1941 the ship was involved in the hunt for the German battleship Bismarck and was present at the sinking. Later that year the Tartar was at work in the Arctic and then in August escorted the battleship HMS Prince of Wales to Newfoundland for Winston Churchill's meeting with President Franklin D. Roosevelt. In November he left the Tartar for officer training at HMS King Alfred in Hove, where he heard of the Japanese attack on Pearl Harbor. He then became a Temporary Sub Lieutenant in the Royal Naval Reserve and early in 1942 fulfilled various administrative posts related to signalling in Newhaven and Dartmouth.

One day in 1943 he found on his desk an Admiralty circular calling for volunteers to learn Japanese in the United States. In September 1943 he sailed from Liverpool in order to make his way to the US Navy Language School at Boulder, Colorado, where he did a 14-month course in Japanese. In spring 1945, when he had finished the course and had undergone some further training in Vancouver and New York, he flew to Australia, where he was attached to the Allied Translator and Interpreter Section and was required to make his way to Manila, where he interrogated Japanese prisoners. He was then ordered to join the British battleship HMS King George V but before he reached the ship he heard of the dropping of the atomic bombs. When the King George V entered Tokyo Bay for the surrender ceremony, which took place on the deck of USS Missouri on 2 September 1945, Beasley had to act as interpreter when a Japanese pilot came on board.

After the surrender ceremony Beasley went ashore as British naval intelligence liaison officer at US naval headquarters in Yokosuka. He was subsequently posted to the Naval Intelligence Section of the UK Liaison Mission in Tokyo, which represented British interests until diplomatic relations were restored in 1952. In March 1946 he was recalled to Britain and his naval career was over.

== Career ==
In 1946 Beasley returned to Westminster College to work on an MA in history but by summer 1947 he had decided that he did not want to be a school teacher. He wrote his thesis on the history of Anglo-Japanese relations for what had now become a PhD. In October 1947 Beasley accepted a part-time post lecturing in Japanese history and in October 1948 he was appointed Lecturer in Far Eastern History at the School of Oriental and African Studies (SOAS). He completed his PhD in 1950 and later that year returned to Japan on study leave for a year. While there he worked at the Historiographical Institute of the University of Tokyo. In 1954 he became Professor of the History of the Far East, a post that he held until he retired in 1983.

== Personal life ==
In April 1955 Beasley married Hazel Polwin.

== Selected works ==
In a statistical overview derived from writings by and about William G. Beasley, OCLC/WorldCat encompasses roughly 80+ works in 300+ publications in 8 languages and 11,000+ library holdings.

- Great Britain and the Opening of Japan, 1834-1858 (1951)
- Select Documents on Japanese Foreign Policy, 1853-1868 (1955)
- Historians of China and Japan (1961)
- The modern history of Japan (1963)
- The Meiji Restoration (1972). Winner John K. Fairbank Prize
- Modern Japan: Aspects of History, Literature, and Society (1975)
- Japanese Imperialism, 1894-1945 (1987)
- The Rise of Modern Japan (1989)
- Japan Encounters the Barbarian: Japanese Travellers in America and Europe (1995)
- The Japanese experience : a short history of Japan (1999)

== Honours and awards ==
- British Academy, 1967.
- American Historical Association, John K. Fairbank Prize, 1972.
- Order of the British Empire, Commander (CBE), 1980.
- Order of the Rising Sun, Gold Rays with Neck Ribbon, 1983.
- Japan Academy, honorary member, 1984.
- Japan Foundation Award, 2001.
