= Folly fort =

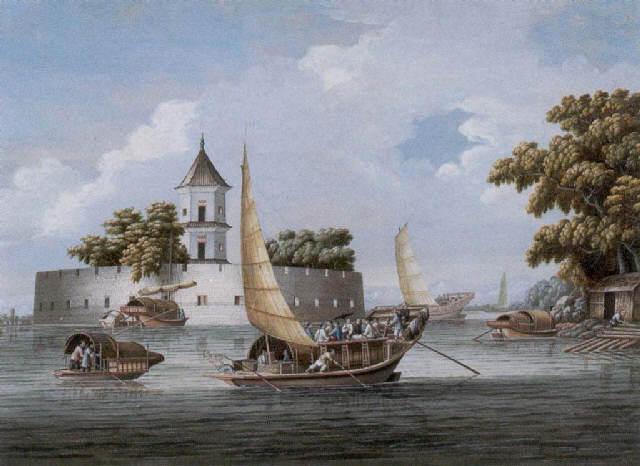
The Dutch folly, located in Canton

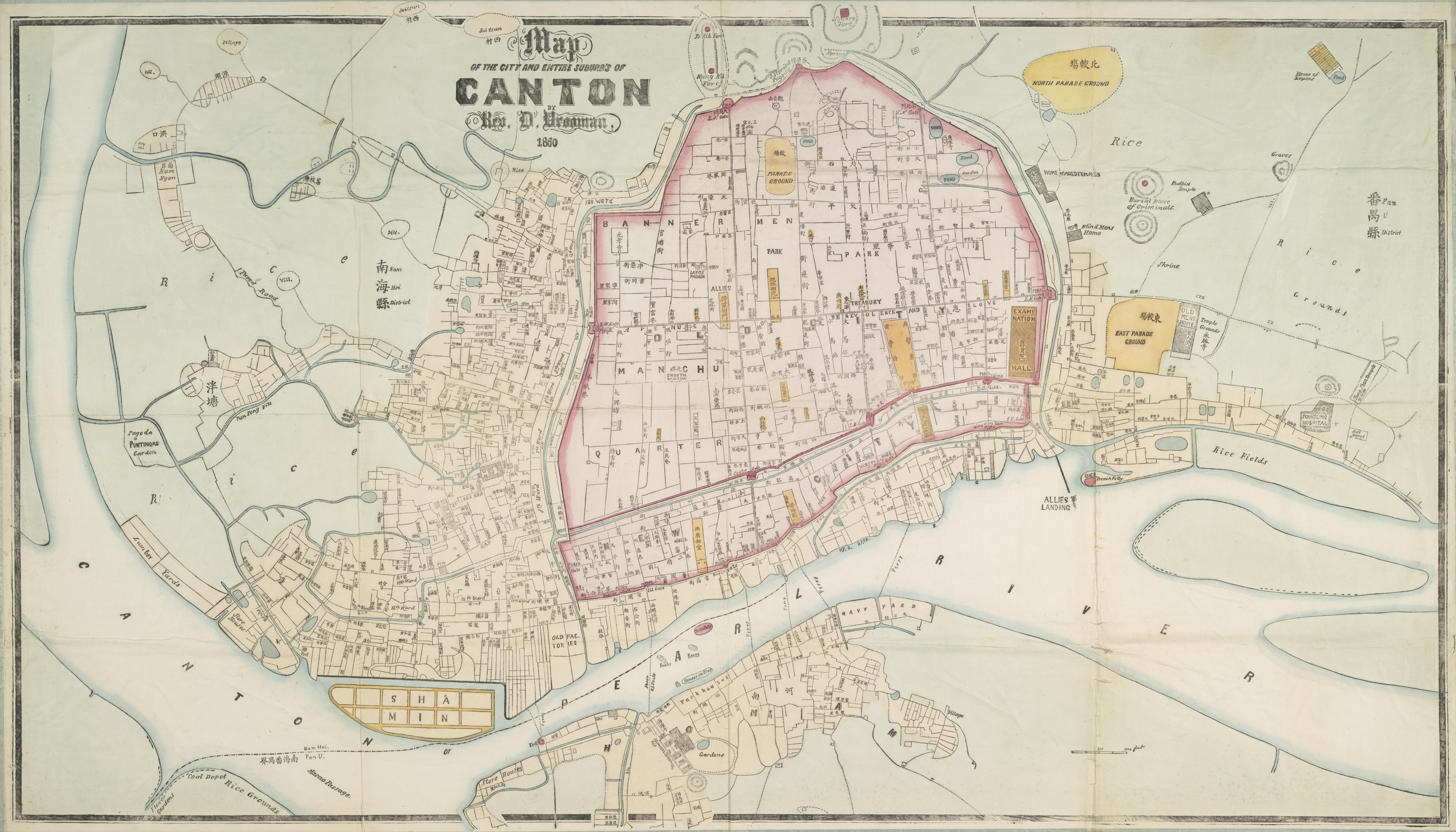
1860 map of Canton showing the folly forts

A folly fort or just folly is a specific type of fort built in shallow water, near the shore, in the second half of the 19th century. The main characteristic of a folly fort was that it was built on the water, very close to the edge, very small, and exclusively for military defense with no intention of being used as normal living quarters. They were really defense fortifications rather than what were called "forts" at the time, which were on land and much larger.

The name derives from forts built at the time in the south of England by Lord Palmerston and which were called "Palmerston's follies". Later, similar forts built by the Europeans in China came to be called "folly fort" or simply "folly".

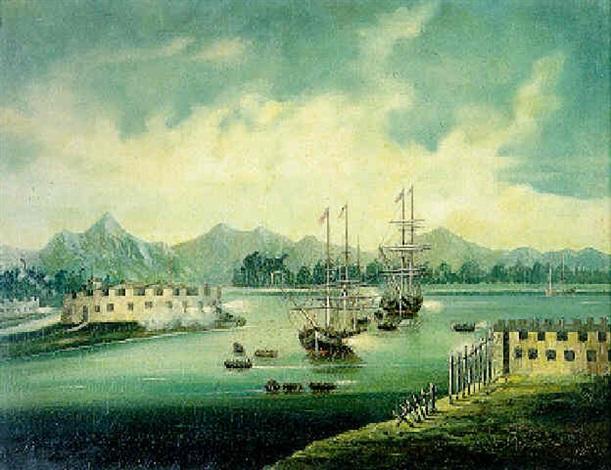
A battle at French Folly Fort by a Chinese painter

The French Folly and Dutch Folly were forts in the Pearl River in Guangzhou (then romanized as "Canton"), which the Europeans used during the Second Opium War.

The Dutch folly was located at 23.1134°N 113.2551°E, which was then a small island in the river. Today two skyscrapers stand in the same place, which is at the water's edge and no longer an island due to land reclamation.

The French folly was located at 23.1205°N 113.2772°E, which is now well inland due to land reclamation. The British captured it on 6 November 1856 in an intense, one-hour action during the second Opium War.

A similar fort that saw action at the time was Macao Fort (23.0728°N 113.2527°E), but it was never called "folly", possibly because the Chinese built it on a larger island that also had a temple. This island, fort, and temple still exist.
