= Miao Peinan =

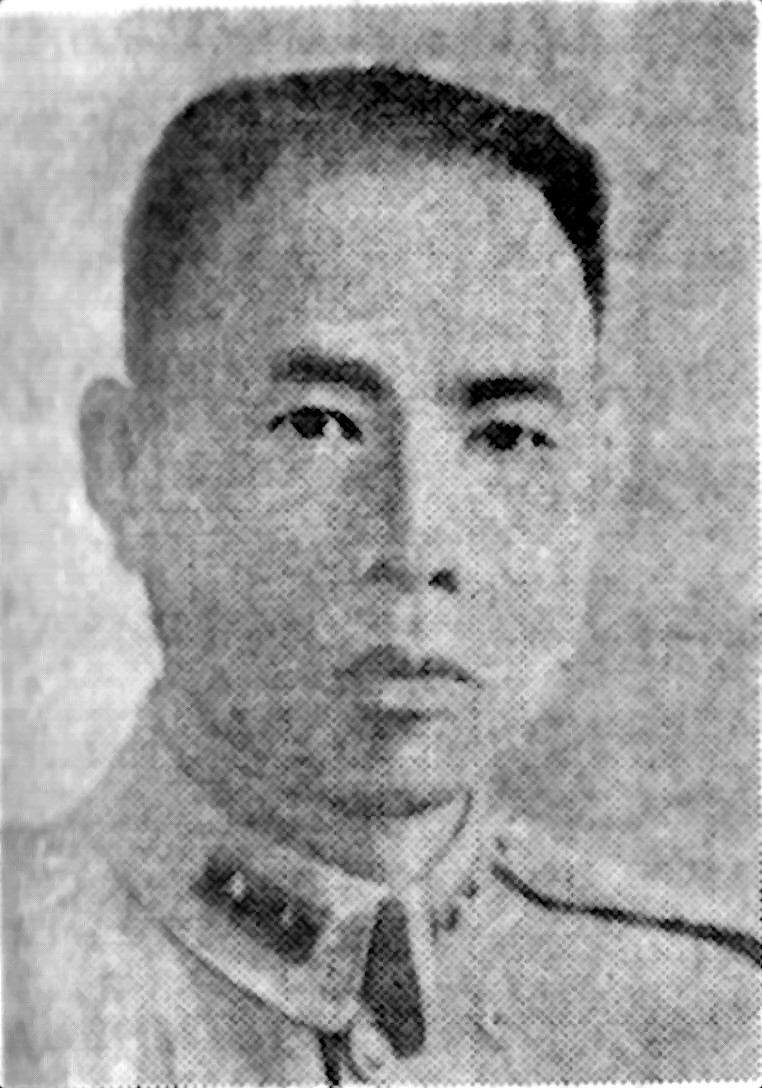
Miao Peinan

Miao Peinan (traditional Chinese: 繆培南; simplified Chinese: 缪培南; Wade–Giles: Miao P'ei-nan; 7 April 1895 - 9 May 1970) was a Chinese National Revolutionary Army general from Wuhua, Guangdong.

== Military career ==
Miao's military career began in 1926 when he was appointed commanding officer of the 35th Regiment, 12th Division, 4th Army. Within a year he in command of the division and within a few months he was made officer in-charge of the 4th Army. In 1931, he became Chief of Staff of the 8th Route Army. The same year he was also appointed Chief of Staff of the 1st Army Group. Then in 1936 he was given the post of the Commanding Officer Officer 5th Army. Miao moved higher up the military command chain when in 1940 he became the Deputy Commanding Officer Guangdong-Fujian-Jiangxi Border Area as well as the Commander-in-Chief, 9th Army Group. In 1945 he was made Acting Director of Dongjiang Field Headquarters, 7th War Area. He was the Republic of China government representative to accept the Japanese surrender in Guangdong in 1945. His continued to move up the army hierarchy with his appointment as the Deputy Director of Guangdong Pacification Headquarters in 1947.

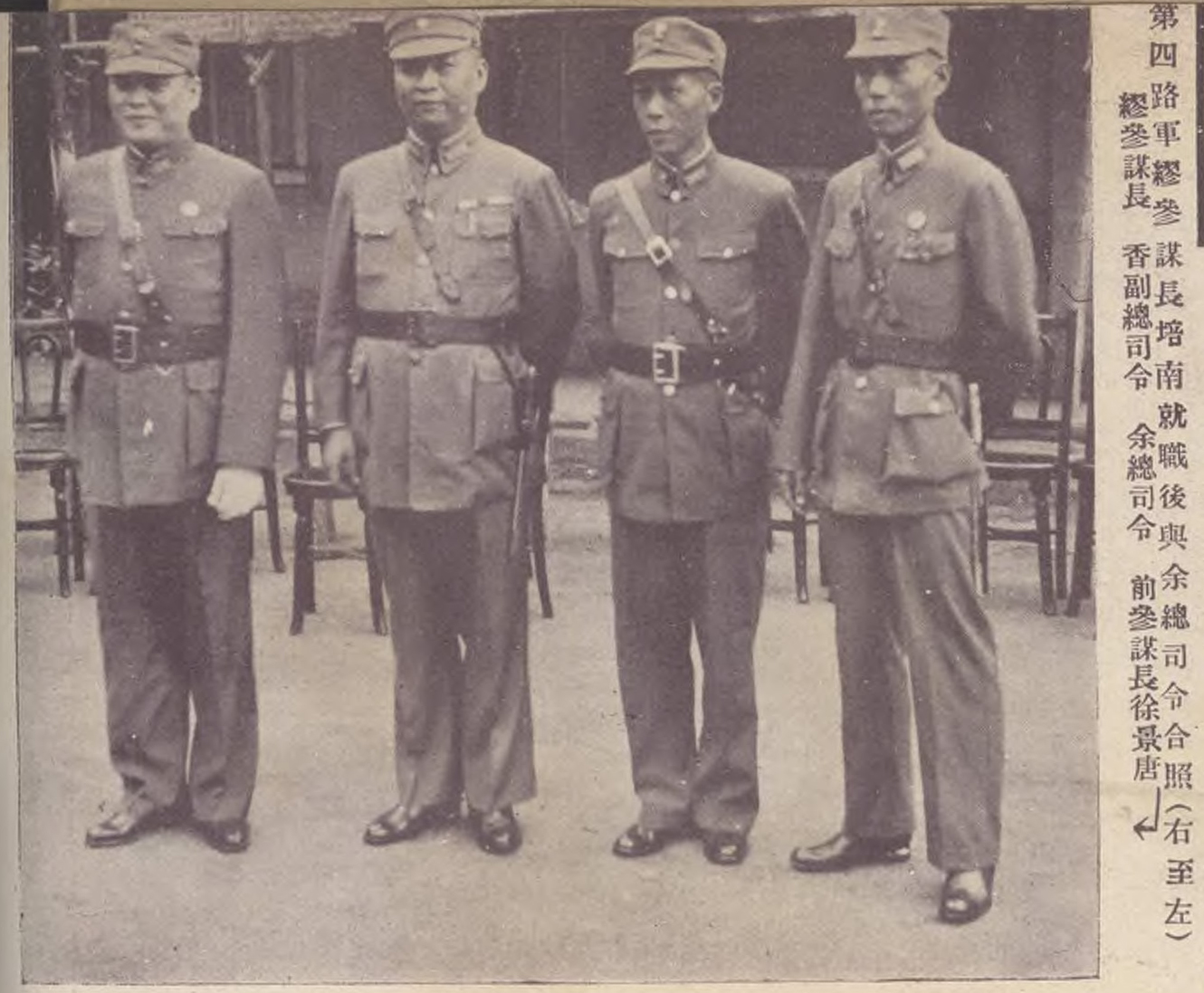
Nationalist generals in Guangdong. Miao is second on the right.

== Retirement ==
In 1949, after the Nationalists were defeated in the Chinese Civil War, Miao did not move to Taiwan but retired in Hong Kong. He died there in 1970.
