= HMS Barracouta (1851) =

Sloop of the Royal Navy

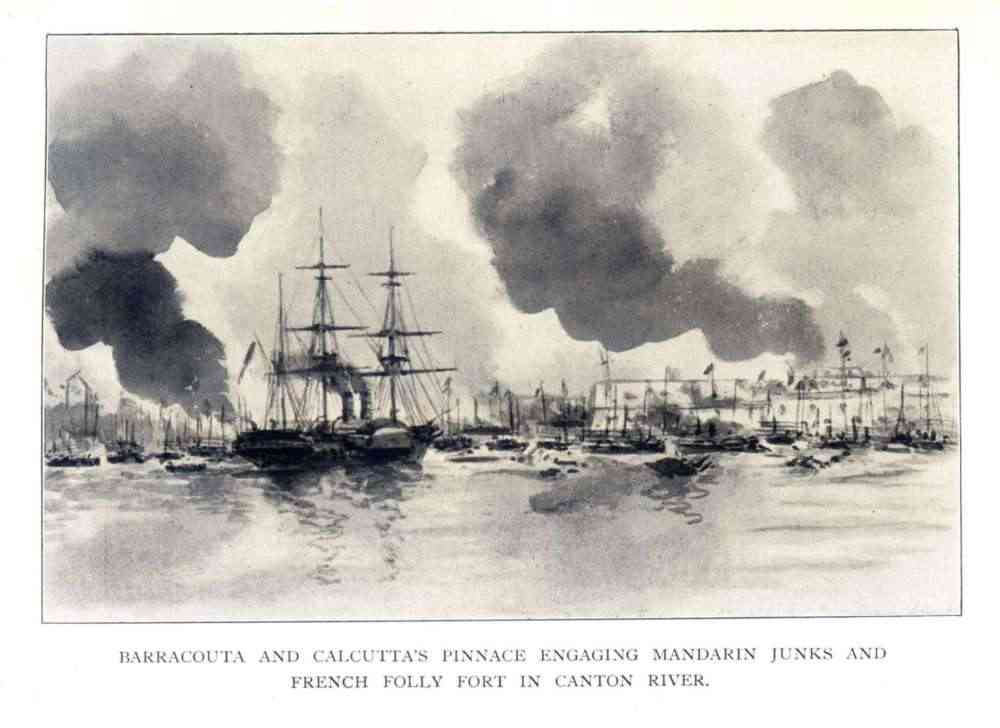
- Barracouta and the boats of HMS Calcutta engaging mandarin junks in the capture of the French Folly Fort in China on 6 November 1856

History

United Kingdom
- Name: HMS Barracouta
- Ordered: 25 April 1847
- Builder: Pembroke Dockyard
- Cost: £50,042 (Note: A total cost accounting for inflation of approximately £6,040,200 in today's money.)
- Laid down: May 1849
- Launched: 31 March 1851
- Commissioned: 30 July 1853
- Out of service: 1877
- Fate: Broken up in 1881

General characteristics
- Type: Paddle sloop
- Displacement: 1,676 tons
- Tons burthen: 1,048 40/94 bm
- Length: 190 ft 2 in (58.0 m) (gundeck); 166 ft 4 1/2 in (50.7 m) (keel)
- Beam: 35 ft 0 in (10.7 m) oa
- Depth of hold: 20 ft 5 in (6.2 m)
- Installed power: 300 nhp; 881 ihp (657 kW)
- Propulsion: 2-cylinder direct-acting steam engine; Paddle wheels
- Sail plan: Barque-rigged
- Speed: 10.5 kn (19.4 km/h)
- Complement: 100
- Armament: As built: 2 × 10-inch (84 cwt) pivot guns; 4 × 32-pounder (25 cwt) guns; From 1856: 1 × 68-pounder (95 cwt) gun; 1 × 10-inch (84 cwt) pivot guns; 4 × 32-pounder (42 cwt) guns; From 1862: 1 × Armstrong 110-pounder gun; 1 × 10-inch (84 cwt) pivot guns; 4 × 32-pounder (42 cwt) guns

HMS Barracouta was the last paddle sloop built for the Royal Navy. She was built at Pembroke Dockyard and launched in 1851. She served in the Pacific theatre of the Crimean War, in the Second Opium War and in the Anglo-Ashanti wars. She paid off for the last time in 1877 and was broken up in 1881.

== Design and construction ==
Barracouta was designed as a second-class paddle sloop and ordered from Pembroke Dockyard on 25 April 1847. She was armed with two 10-inch (84 cwt) (Note: "cwt", or "hundredweight" refers to the weight of the gun itself.) pivot guns and four 32-pounder (Note: "32-pounder" refers to the weight of the shot fired.) (25 cwt) guns. Her two-cylinder direct-acting steam engine was provided by Miller, Ravenhill & Salkeld at a cost of £18,228, and produced 300 nominal horsepower, or 881 indicated horsepower (657 kW).

Her armament was changed in 1856, when one of the 10-inch guns was replaced by a 68-pounder (95 cwt) gun, and the 25 cwt 32-pounders were replaced with 42 cwt versions. In 1862 the 68-pounder was replaced by an Armstrong 110-pounder (82 cwt) breech-loading rifle.

Her keel was laid in May 1849 and she was launched on 31 March 1851. Her total cost was £50,042 and was the only ship ever built to the design, as well as being the last paddle sloop built for the Royal Navy. She was provided with a barque rig.

== Service ==
Barracouta was commissioned on 30 July 1853 At 9 p.m. that day, she was in collision with the brig Duff off the north Kent coast. She was ordered to join the East Indies and China Station in 1854.

=== China station ===
From September to mid-October 1854, Barracouta was part of a squadron of four ships led by vice admiral Sir James Stirling. With the start of the Crimean War, Stirling was anxious to prevent Russian ships from sheltering in Japanese ports and menacing allied shipping and led the squadron to Nagasaki where he concluded the Anglo-Japanese Friendship Treaty with representatives of the Tokugawa shogunate. Later during the Crimean War she participated in the siege of Petropavlovsk.

She also participated during the Second Opium War in 1856 before returning to England and being paid off in 1857.

=== North America station ===
Barracouta was sent to North America and West Indies Station in 1860 until 1864, before being paid off and then returning to the North America and West Indies Station in 1866. She returned to England in 1870 and was paid off and was used as a tender at the Portsmouth Dockyard.

=== West Africa ===
She served in West Africa, as part of the Cape of Good Hope Station in 1873, and participated in the Anglo-Ashanti wars. On 28 April, she towed the Italian barque Vittorio in to Gibraltar. The barque had run aground at La Atunara, Spain and had been abandoned in a waterlogged condition.

=== Australia station ===
After being refitted in England, Barracouta commenced service on the Australia Station in August 1874. She took part in the Samoan operations in 1876. In Samoa, sailors from the Barracouta got into a skirmish with the Samoans loyal to King Malietoa Laupepa, between 33 and 50 British sailors were ambushed. The sailors took three hostages as human shields, one being American Colonel A. B. Steinberger. During the clash, otherwise known as the battle of Mulinu'u, 7-8 sailors were killed including 2 officers with another 20 wounded. Loyalist Samoans lost between an estimated 8–49 killed or wounded. Having the American hostage prevented the Samoans from slaughtering the sailors fearing the death of the American official. Barracouta left the Australia Station in July 1876 and returned to England and was paid off at the Chatham Dockyard in 1877.

== Fate ==
She was broken up at Chatham in December 1881.
