= Ye Mingchen =

Chinese official (1807–1859)

Baron of the First Rank Ye Mingchen
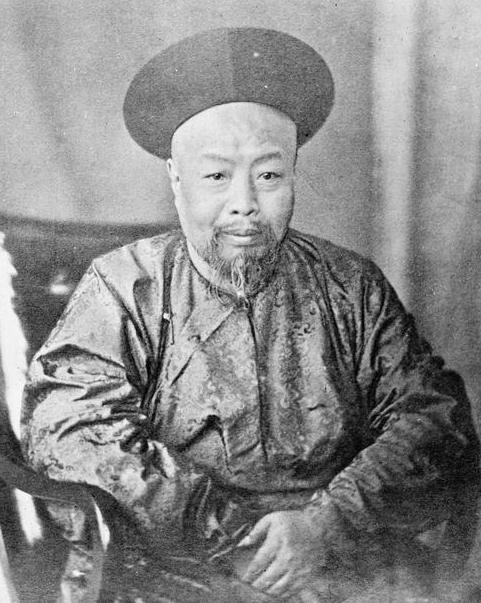
- Photograph of Ye Mingchen taken while in captivity, c. 1858–59

Grand Secretary of the Tiren Library
- In office 1855–1857

Assistant Grand Secretary
- In office 1855–1855

Viceroy of Liangguang
- In office 1852–1858
- Preceded by: Xu Guangjin
- Succeeded by: Huang Zonghan

Personal details
- Born: 21 December 1807 Hanyang, Hubei, Qing China
- Died: 9 April 1859 (aged 51); Calcutta, British Raj
- Resting place: Hanyang
- Occupation: Politician, Imperial viceroy

Military service
- Battles/wars: Second Opium War

Ye Mingchen
- Traditional Chinese: 葉名琛
- Simplified Chinese: 叶名琛
Transcriptions
Standard Mandarin
- Hanyu Pinyin: Yè Míngchēn
- Wade–Giles: Yeh Ming-ch'en

Ye Mingchen (21 December 1807 – 9 April 1859) was a high-ranking Chinese official during the Qing dynasty, known for his resistance to British influence in Canton (Guangzhou) in the aftermath of the First Opium War and his role in the beginning of the Second Opium War.

== Early career ==
Ye came from a scholarly family in Hubei province, son of Ye Zhishen (葉志詵) and a connoisseur of antiquities. He was awarded the juren degree in 1835, the jinshi, or highest degree, in 1837, after which he briefly held the position of compiler in the imperial elite school, the Hanlin Academy. In 1838, Ye received his first official appointment as prefect of Xing'an in Shaanxi province and he subsequently rose rapidly through the ranks in the Qing civil service. In the following years he served as circuit intendant of Yanping in Shanxi province, salt inspector in Jiangxi, surveillance commissioner in Yunnan and financial commissioner first in Hunan, later in Gansu and finally Guangdong province, of which he became governor in 1848, just as the Taiping Rebellion was breaking out.

Around 1850, Ye Mingchen and his father established an association in the western suburbs of Guangzhou to worship Lü Dongbin, one of the Daoist Eight Immortals known for helping the common people, and to provide medical prescriptions. Ye is said to have commanded troops in battle on the basis of communications with Lü. Some unsympathetic observers account for his inadequate preparations, misplaced confidence, and the ease with which the British captured him by pointing to his belief in occult Daoism and oracular divination.

== Internal and external conflicts ==
As governor of Guangdong, Ye was faced with both internal and external crises. British traders claimed that the right to reside in the city of Guangzhou proper had been guaranteed by the Treaty of Nanking. In fact, the treaty read differently in its English and Chinese versions, the latter only permitting foreigners to reside temporarily in the harbors of the newly opened treaty ports. Ye stood strong and refused the British demands.

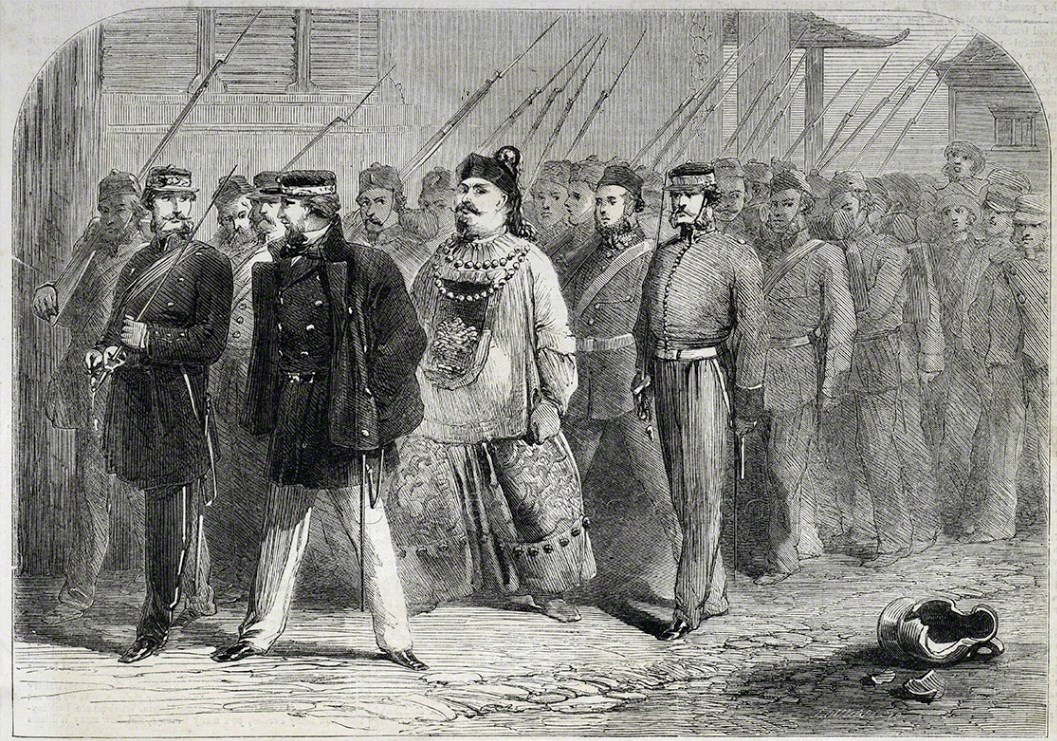
Ye is captured by the British armies and sent onboard HMS Inflexible.

As a reward for his ostensible success in keeping the British out of Guangzhou, he was promoted to Viceroy of Liangguang as well as imperial commissioner in 1852, which made him the highest-ranking official in relations with the West. Ye Mingchen remained steadfastly opposed to yielding to British demands, but he was not able to resist the British with military force. The conflict with the British Empire came to a head in 1856, when Ye seized a Chinese-owned and Chinese-crewed ship, the lorcha Arrow, which was registered in Hong Kong and also claimed, notwithstanding witnesses to the contrary, to be flying a British flag at the time the vessel was stopped. Ye was in the midst of putting down the Red Turban Rebellion, and had executed tens of thousands of rebels, with some estimates reaching 1 million, and his concern with renegade shipping was understandable. British Consul Harry Parkes rushed to rescue the crew and sent a note to Ye demanding compensation for the seizure (it later emerged that Parkes was aware that the ship's registration had expired). Parkes and Sir John Bowring were determined that this incident should provide the British and French with a just cause to declare war on China, starting the Second Opium War.

In October, British warships opened fire on Guangzhou, taking aim at Ye's residence, but in December Ye still refused to give in to British and French demands for direct negotiations and compensation for foreign property which had been burned by mobs. In the meantime, Prime Minister Palmerston denounced Ye on the floor of Parliament as an "inhuman monster," and held him responsible for executing 70,000 Chinese. Richard Cobden, however, defended Ye, commending his "mild and conciliatory tone" even after the British bombarded his personal residence. The government was defeated.

Events in Hong Kong proceeded quickly. In late December, Allied bombardments set Guangzhou aflame. Ye was in the midst of suppressing rebellion in Guangxi, did not dare to bring troops, and the city quickly fell. Harry Parkes hunted Ye through the streets of Guangzhou, and a British colleague reported that Parkes took special pleasure in humiliating Ye. "Ye was my game," said Parkes, and finally found what a report called "a very fat man contemplating the achievement of getting over the wall at the extreme rear of the yamun." In violation of diplomatic procedure, the British brought him as a prisoner of war to Fort William, Calcutta, in British India where he died a year later of sickness at Tollygunge just outside Calcutta. Ye's remains were later returned (13 May 1859) for interment in Guangzhou (Canton) towed by a ship chartered by the American government, the Hong Kong.

== Legacy ==
The Cantonese community is said to have respected Ye Mingchen for his intransigence against the British, but also ridiculed his inability to resist them on the battlefield. In Guangzhou he was known as the "six nots": "he would not fight; he would not make peace; he would not take steps for defense; he would not die; he would not surrender; and he would not flee." (不戰、不和、不守、不死、不降、不走 buzhan, buhe, bushou, busi, buxiang, buzou)

Ye briefly won the favor of the Xianfeng Emperor, but his policy fell out of favor when hostilities broke out. Contemporary British public opinion regarded "Commissioner Yeh" as the embodiment of Chinese xenophobia and he was frequently caricatured in British media. But his image in the West was not unanimously negative. For instance, the German writer Theodor Fontane, who learned about Ye while working in London in the late 1850s, was touched by Ye's fate and later published an essay on the official.

Official Chinese historiography long blamed Ye for precipitating the Second Opium War, but now he is frequently hailed as an early Chinese patriot and a monument has been erected in his memory in Guangzhou.

== Iconography ==
A sketch of Ye captured and kept on board HMS Inflexible was made to depict him as a hideous monster. It got broad circulation as British propaganda justifying the Arrow (second Opium) War.

== References and further reading ==
- Cobden, Richard, China and the Attack on Canton (Given to the House of Commons, 26 February 1857).
- Cooke, George Wingrove (1858). China. London, New York: G. Routledge. (HathiTrust)
- Lovell, Julia (2011). Opium War. London: Picador. ISBN 9780330537858.
- Tu, Lien-che (1943). "Yeh Ming-ch'ên" . In Hummel, Arthur W. Sr. (ed.). Eminent Chinese of the Ch'ing Period. Vol. II. United States Government Printing Office. pp. 904–905.
- Wong, J. Y. (1976). Yeh Ming-Ch'en: Viceroy of Liang Kuang 1852-8. Cambridge Eng.; New York: Cambridge University Press. ISBN 0521210232.
- —— (1998). Deadly Dreams: Opium, Imperialism, and the Arrow War (1856-1860) in China. Cambridge; New York: Cambridge University Press. ISBN 0521552559.

Government offices
Preceded by Xu Guangjin	Viceroy of Liangguang; 1852–1858	Succeeded by Huang Zonghan
