= George Wingrove Cooke =

British lawyer and historian (1814–1865)

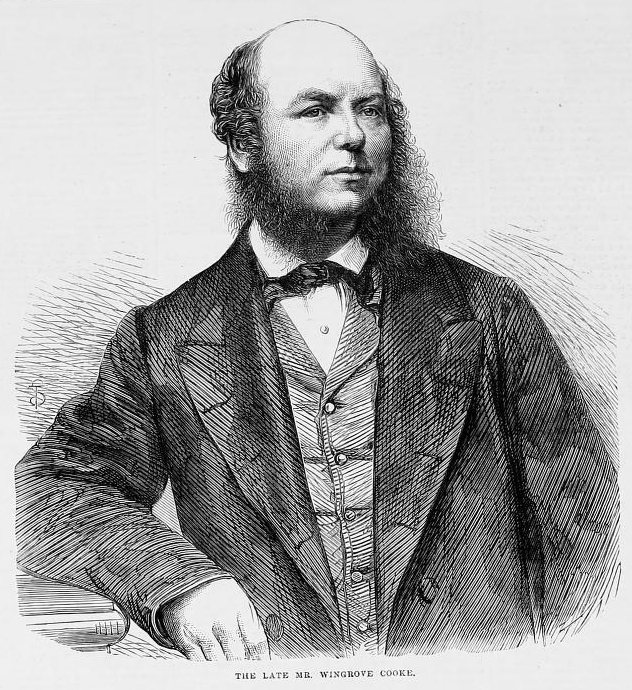

George Wingrove Cooke (1814 – 18 June 1865) was a British lawyer and historian.

== Life ==
Cooke was born in Bristol and studied at Jesus College, Oxford (where he obtained his Bachelor of Arts degree in 1834) and at the University of London, where he studied law before being called to the bar by Middle Temple in 1835. His first book (Memoirs of Lord Bolingbroke, written whilst Cooke was an undergraduate), was published in 1835. Further books followed in the succeeding two years: A History of Party from the Rise of the Whig and Tory Factions to the Passing of the Reform Bill and a biography of the first Earl of Shaftesbury. Other publications reflected his employment on a commissions relating to tithes and enclosures. Inside Sebastopol was a description of his visit to the Crimea during the Crimean War in 1855, and his work for The Times as a special correspondent in 1857 during the Second Opium War led to another successful book. He stood unsuccessfully for Parliament on two occasions. After being appointed a commissioner in the copyhold commission in 1862, he fell ill in June 1865 and died of a heart attack on 18 June 1865.
