= The Battle of Dagukou =

The Battle of the Taku Forts was a series of engagements between Military of the Qing dynasty and the Second Opium War near the Taku (Dagu) Military campaign. A total of three Combat took place, ultimately ending with the capture of the Taku Forts and the defeat of the Military of the Qing dynasty.

== Course of the battle ==
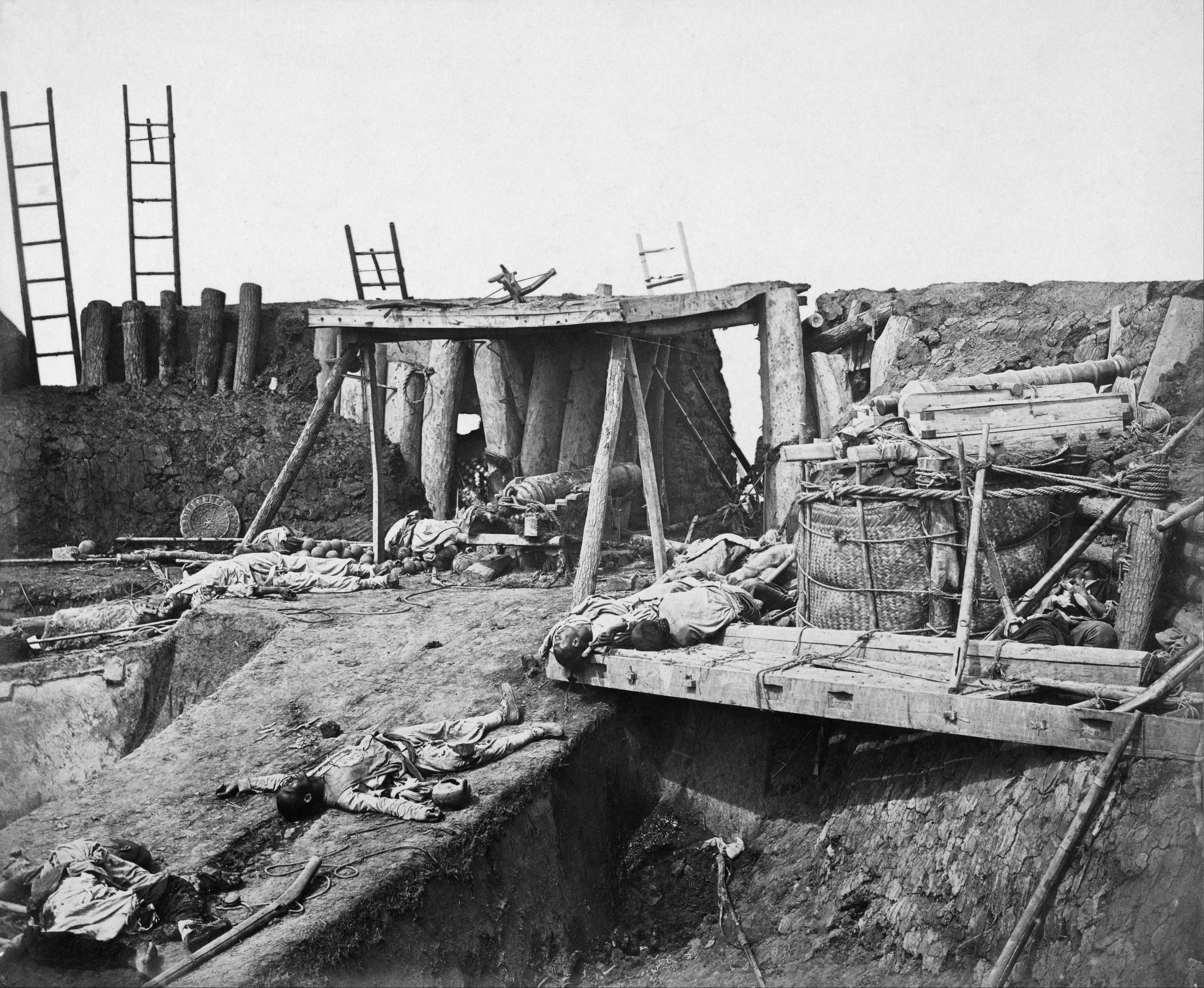
The post-war Taku Forts

On May 20, 1858, the Anglo-French allied forces used six gunboats to cover the landing of nearly one thousand marines on the flank of the Taku Forts. Qing forces opened fire in resistance, inflicting casualties on nearly one hundred allied soldiers. However, Tan Tingxiang, the Viceroy of Zhili, abandoned his post and fled, leaving the defending troops isolated and without support. More than 300 Qing soldiers were killed in battle, and both the northern and southern forts were successively captured by the allied forces.On May 26, 1858, the Anglo-French forces advanced along the river and reached Tianjin. On June 13, 1858, Grand Secretary Guiliang and Minister of Personnel Huashana first signed the Treaty of Tientsin with the Russia plenipotentiary Yevfimiy Putyatin. On June 23, 1858, Guiliang and Huashana signed separate Treaties of Tientsin with representatives of Britain, France, and the United States at Haiguang Treaty of Tientsin.

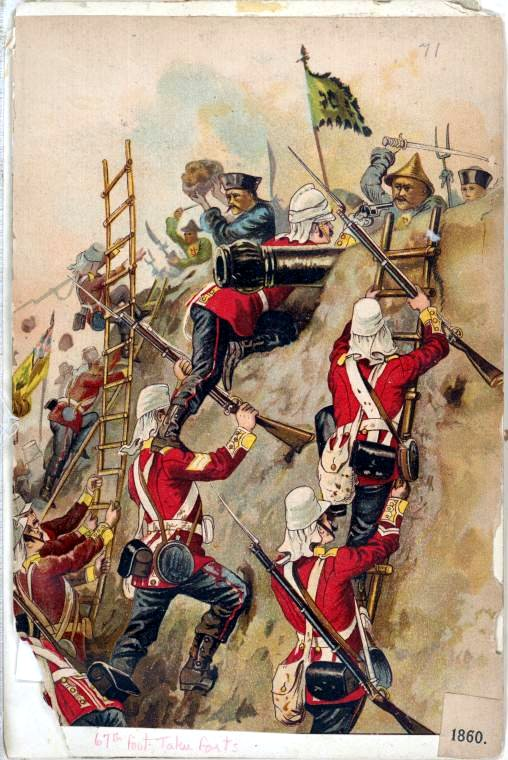
The British army captured the Taku Forts

On June 20, 1859, the envoys of Britain, France, and the United States arrived outside the Taku estuary. The Qing government requested that they land at Beitang District in the north and proceed to Beijing under Qing military escort to exchange ratifications, but this proposal was rejected.On June 25, 1859, the Anglo-French allied forces launched an attack on the Taku Forts, initiating the Second Battle of Taku Forts (1859). The British naval commander Sir James Hope personally led twelve warships to attack the forts at 3 p.m. Qing defenders returned fire, damaging the allied fleet; four allied warships were sunk. After suffering repeated heavy losses, the Anglo-French forces retreated that night.

On August 1, 1860, the Anglo-French forces dispatched more than thirty warships and 5,000 marines, successfully landing near Beitang and launching the Third Battle of Taku Forts (1860). The Allied forces then successively captured Xinhe County, Hebei and Tanggu, Tianjin before attacking the forts from the north. After fierce resistance, the Qing forces were defeated, and the northern fort was captured. Subsequently, under the orders of the Xianfeng Emperor, Sengge Rinchen abandoned the southern fort, and the remaining Qing troops retreated to Tianjin. From this point on, the Taku Forts fell completely under allied control.

== See also ==
- Second Opium War
- Taku Forts
