= Battle of Palikao =

1860 battle of the Second Opium War

Coordinates: 39°54′24″N 116°36′51″E

- Part of the Second Opium War
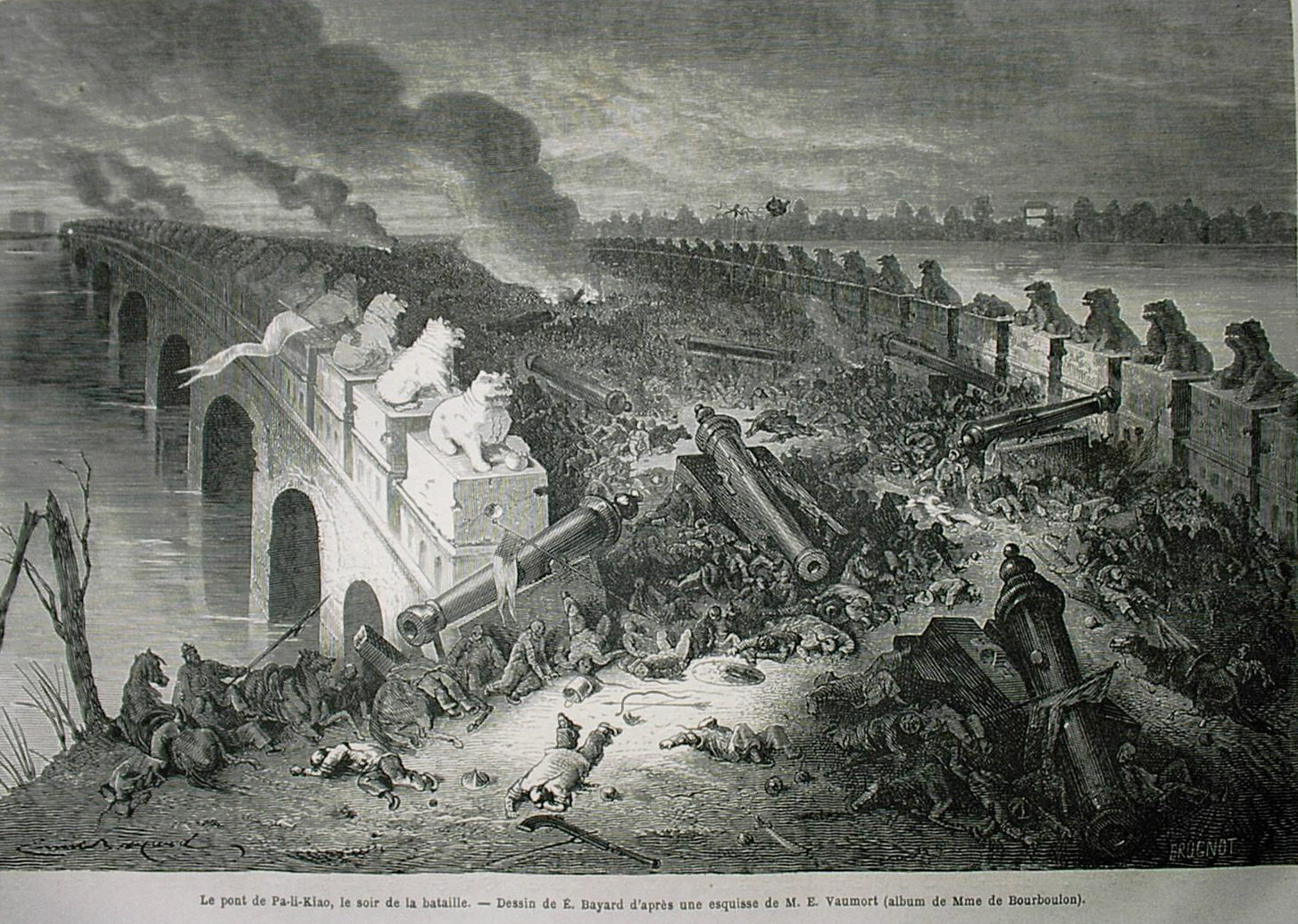
- The bridge of Palikao on the evening of the battle
Date	21 September 1860
Location	Palikao, China
Result	Franco-British victory

Belligerents
United Kingdom; France	Qing China

Commanders and leaders
(United Kingdom of Great Britain and Ireland) James Hope Grant (Second French Empire) Charles Cousin-Montauban	(Qing dynasty) Sengge Rinchen

Strength
10,000	50,000

Casualties and losses
British: 2 killed 29 wounded French: 3 killed 18 wounded	1,200 casualties

The Battle of Palikao (French: La bataille de Palikao; simplified Chinese: 八里桥之战; traditional Chinese: 八里橋之戰; pinyin: Bālǐqiáo zhī zhàn; lit. 'Battle of the Eight-Mile Bridge') was fought at the bridge of Baliqiao by Anglo-French forces against the Qing dynasty of China during the Second Opium War on the morning of 21 September 1860. It allowed Western forces to take the capital Beijing and eventually defeat the Qing Empire.

== Background ==
The Anglo-French force had been trying for two years to get to Beijing. In 1858, the signing of the Treaty of Tianjin stopped the potential visit after capturing the Taku Forts that defended the Hai River, which were returned to the Qing army. In 1859, an armed attempt to enter the river was stopped by barriers across the river that resulted in a dramatic defeat of the Anglo-French forces when they tried to recapture the forts from the river direction.

Sailing from Hong Kong in July, the capture of the Taku Forts on 21 August 1860 had opened up the river route to Beijing. The Chinese authorities at the fort had capitulated all 22 forts along the river as far as Tianjin, including that town.

The aim of the Anglo-French expedition was to compel the Chinese government at Beijing to observe the trade treaties signed between their governments at Tianjin in 1858, which included allowing the British to continue the opium trade in China. Lieutenant General Sir Hope Grant was the British commander with Charles Cousin-Montauban in charge of the French.

== Battle ==
The combined Anglo-French force marched in a leisurely manner from the Taku Forts, with the French on one side of the river, the British on the other. Tianjin was reached on 1 September 1860 and negotiations were opened with Beijing.

The negotiators, led by Grant under a flag of truce, were captured by the Qing forces which led to an immediate cessation of negotiations.

The army advanced from Tianjin with a cavalry screen and when they reached Chang-Kia-Wan they met a large Chinese army with a five-mile front. There was a skirmish between cavalry, then with the allied artillery silencing the Chinese artillery. The Chinese army scattered and retired.

Two days later, on 20 September the cavalry discovered the Chinese army in a strong position in front of a canal connecting Beijing with the Hai River, with two bridges at Baliqiao. The allied army attacked frontally and the cavalry attacked from the left forcing the Chinese back over the two bridges. The Anglo-French force inflicted massive losses on the Qing army trapped by the canal. Beijing was invaded thereafter.

On the Qing side, Sengge Rinchen's troops, including elite Mongolian cavalry, were completely annihilated after several doomed frontal charges against concentrated firepower from the allied forces.

== Aftermath ==
With the Qing army devastated, the Xianfeng Emperor fled the capital, leaving his brother, Prince Gong, to be in charge of negotiations.

Negotiations centered around the release of the prisoners. The talks failed and on 11 October engineers threw up works and batteries to break through the walls of Peking. Everything was ready that evening when at 11.30 pm the gate opened and the city surrendered.

The prisoners had been taken to the Ministry of Justice (or Board of Punishments) in Beijing, where they were confined and tortured. Parkes and Loch were returned with 14 other survivors. Twenty British, French and Indian captives died. Their bodies were barely recognisable.

The Anglo-French forces entered Beijing and sacked the Summer Palace and Old Summer Palace. After Harry Smith Parkes and the surviving diplomatic prisoners had been freed, Lord Elgin ordered the Summer Palaces be burnt down, which started on 18 October without the French, whose commander opposed the move. The destruction of the Forbidden City was even discussed, as proposed by Elgin to discourage the Qing Empire from using kidnapping as a bargaining tool, and to exact revenge for the mistreatment of their prisoners.

The French commander Cousin-Montauban was later awarded the title of "Count of Palikao" and a decade later, was made the 31st Prime Minister of France by Napoleon III.

In the Treaty of Tianjin, the Qing court agreed to all Western demands, including the payment of indemnities and the acceptance of foreign diplomats at the imperial court in Beijing. Because neither Qing nor Western diplomats discussed the opium trade, the treaty effectively liberalized it.
