= Amurlingkui =

Mongolian jasagh (1886–1930)

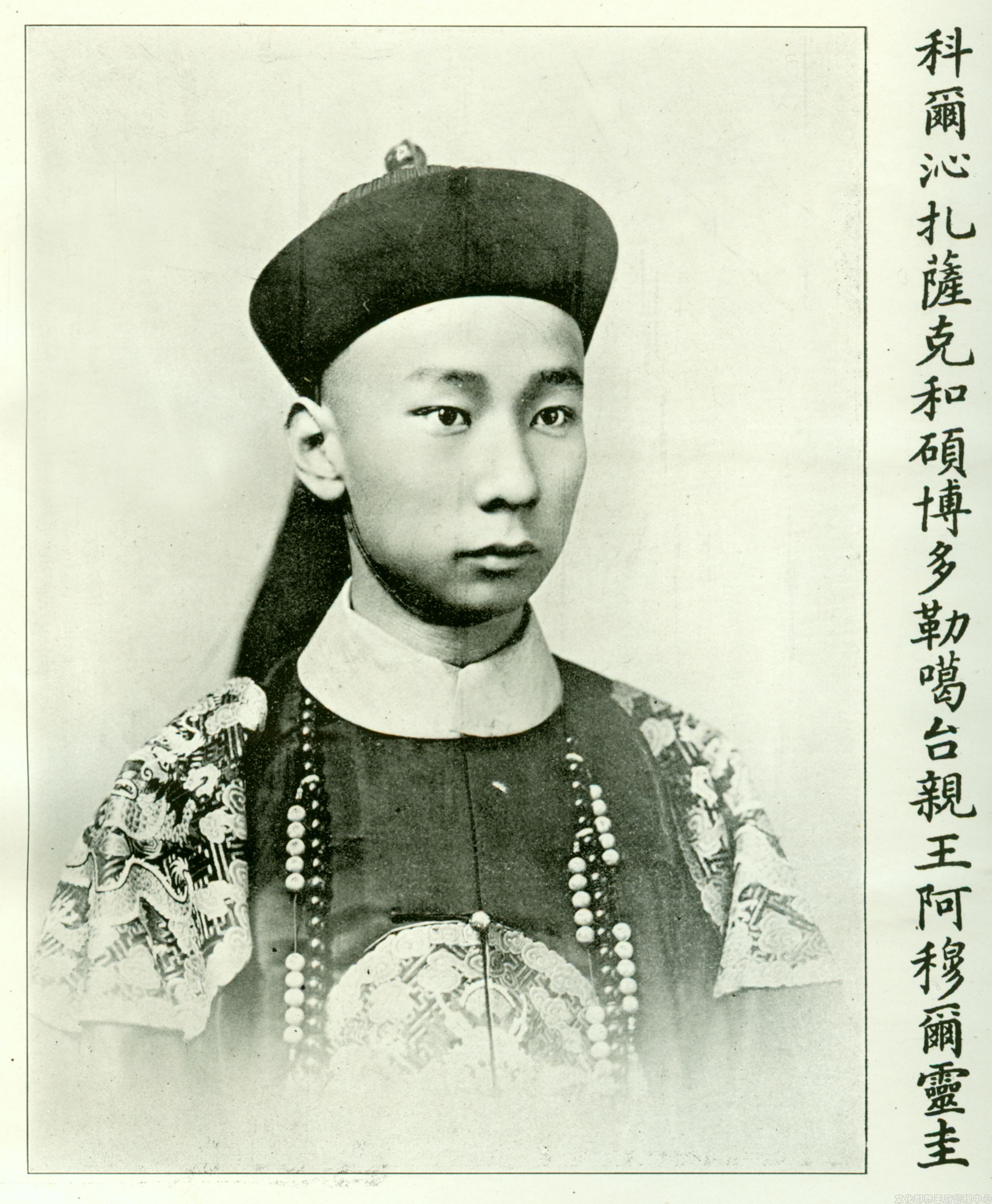

Jasagh of the Horqin Left Rear Banner
- Reign: 1891 – 29 May 1930
- Predecessor: Buyannemekü
- Successor: Banner abolished

Beili
- Reign: 1890 – 1891
- Predecessor: Nersu
- Born: 1866
- Died: 29 May 1930 (aged 44)
- Issue: Hexige
- House: Borjigin
- Father: Nersu
Chinese-character names
Chinese name
Traditional Chinese	阿穆爾靈圭
Simplified Chinese	阿穆尔灵圭
Transcriptions Standard Mandarin: Hanyu Pinyin: Āmù'ěr líng guī; Wade–Giles: A Mu Erh Ling Kuei
Mongolian name
Mongolian Cyrillic	Амарлингуй
Mongolian script	ᠠᠮᠤᠷᠯᠢᠩᠭᠤᠢ
Transcriptions: SASM/GNC: Amarlingui
Chinese name
Traditional Chinese	意莽
Simplified Chinese	意莽
Transcriptions Standard Mandarin: Hanyu Pinyin: Yì mǎng; Wade–Giles: I Mang
Chinese name
Traditional Chinese	色恩甫
Simplified Chinese	色恩甫
Transcriptions Standard Mandarin: Hanyu Pinyin: Sè ēnfǔ; Wade–Giles: Se En Fu

Amurlingkui (Note: Mongolian: ᠠᠮᠤᠷᠯᠢᠩᠭᠤᠢ, Амарлингуй) (1886 – 29 May 1930), courtesy name Yimang (意莽), Chinese name Se Enfu (Chinese: 色恩甫), was a Khorchin Mongol nobleman. He was the 13th jasagh prince of the Horqin Left Rear Banner and the last holder of the peerage.

== Family ==
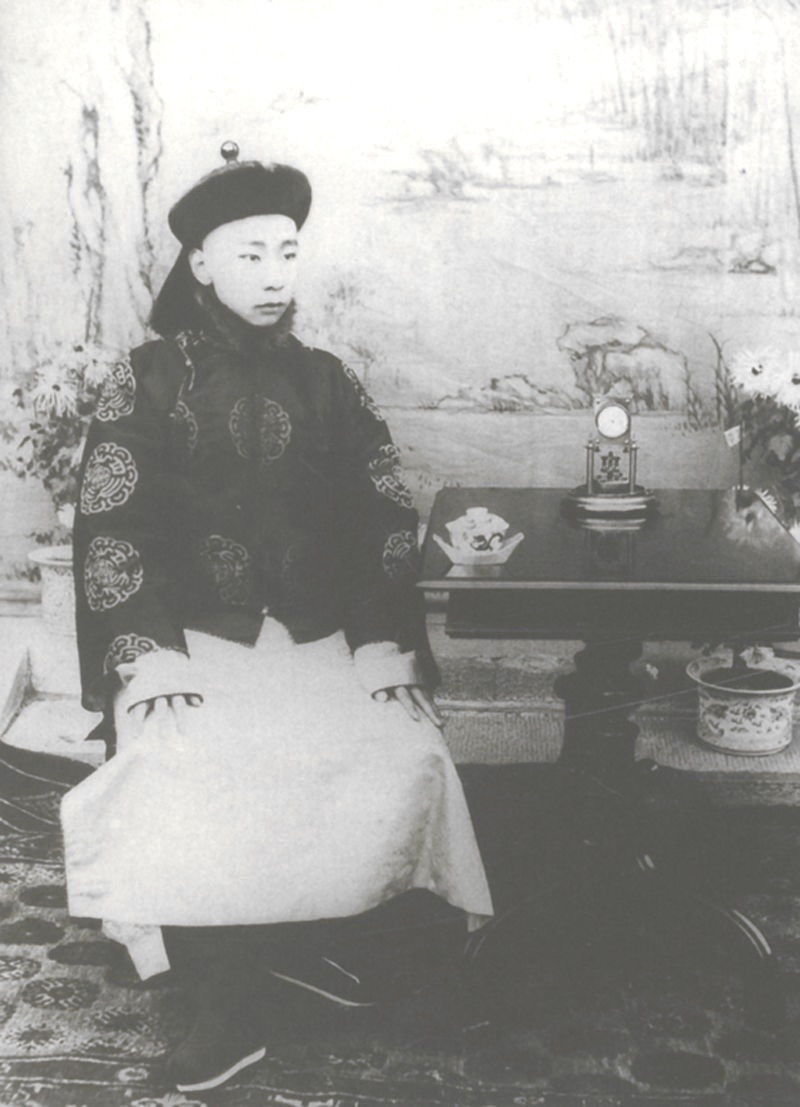
Amarlingui in 1880s

Amurlingkui was a Borjigin descended from Qasar, the younger brother of Genghis Khan. He was the great grandson of Sengge Rinchen.

In 1891, Amurlingkui was only six years old when he succeeded his grandfather Buyannemekü. He received higher education and was able to write in Classical Chinese. He was good at writing poems, prose and calligraphy. After reaching adulthood, he was put in charge of his own fief in Horqin.

During the Xinhai Revolution, Amurlingkui and other Mongol noblemen organized the league of Mongol princes supporting the house of Aisin-Gioro. However, after Yuan Shikai took over the power, the Mongol noblemen turned their support to Yuan instead.

With the fall of the Qing dynasty, he became a senator in the provisional senate of the Republic of China and a member of the political council. He also participated in the second congress of Republic of China. He died in the year of 1930. His son Heshig inherited the Jasagh status but lost the title of prince.

The later years of Amurlingkui were troubled by economic crisis of his family. Taxes could no longer be collected from the peasants of his fief, and salaries from the congress were not sufficient to support his many relatives. He eventually had to sell his mansion in Beijing in order to relieve himself from the plight.
