= James Hope (Royal Navy officer) =

Royal Navy Admiral of the Fleet (1808–1881)

Admiral of the Fleet Sir James Hope GCB
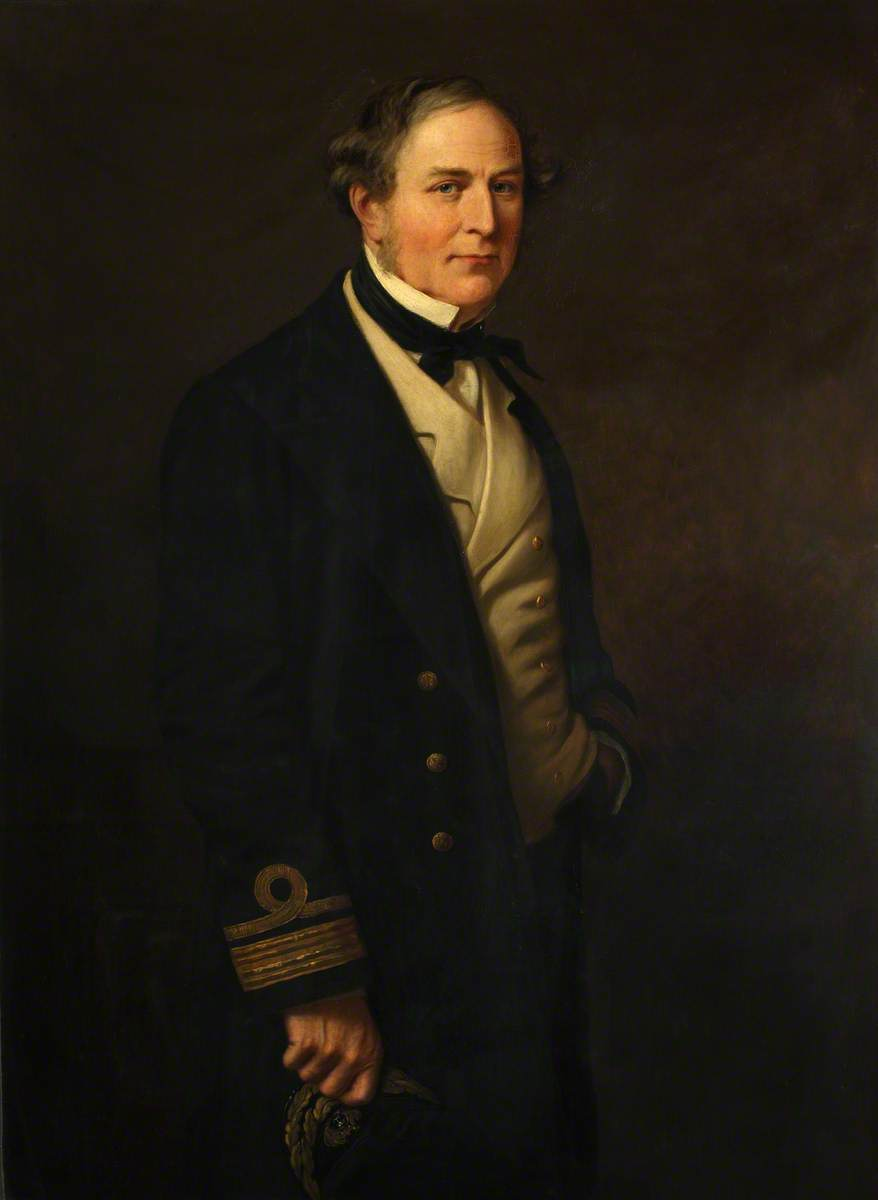
- Portrait by Joseph Sydney Willis Hodges
- Born: 3 March 1808
- Died: 9 June 1881 (aged 73); Carriden House, Bo'ness
- Spouse(s): Frederica Kinnaird; Elizabeth Reid Cotton
- Military career
- Allegiance: United Kingdom
- Branch: Royal Navy
- Service years: 1820–1878
- Rank: Admiral of the Fleet
- Commands: HMS Racer; HMS Firebrand; HMS Terrible; HMS Majestic; East Indies and China Station; North America and West Indies Station; Portsmouth Command
- Conflicts: Uruguayan Civil War; Crimean War; Second Opium War; Tsushima Incident; Taiping Rebellion
- Awards: Knight Grand Cross of the Order of the Bath; Legion of Honour

Admiral of the Fleet Sir James Hope, GCB (3 March 1808 – 9 June 1881) was a Royal Navy officer. As a captain he was present at the Battle of Vuelta de Obligado during the Uruguayan Civil War and then in the Baltic Sea during the Crimean War.

Hope became Commander-in-Chief, East Indies and China Station and, when the Chinese authorities refused to allow British and French ministers to travel to Peking, he was instructed to force the Hai River. He assembled a squadron of eleven gunboats and other vessels and, at the Second Battle of the Taku Forts, he led an assault on the forts at the mouth of the river in a resumption of the Second Opium War. However the forts had been strengthened and the squadron encountered firm resistance from the Chinese defenders: Hope was forced to retreat.

Two years later the Russians attempted to establish a year-round anchorage on the coast of the island of Tsushima, a Japanese territory located between Kyushu and Korea, in what became known as the Tsushima Incident. Hope arrived with two British warships and forced the Russian corvette Posadnik to withdraw. The following year he provided assistance to the Imperial Chinese Army in putting down the Taiping Rebellion. He went on to be Commander-in-Chief, North America and West Indies Station and then Commander-in-Chief, Portsmouth.

== Early career ==
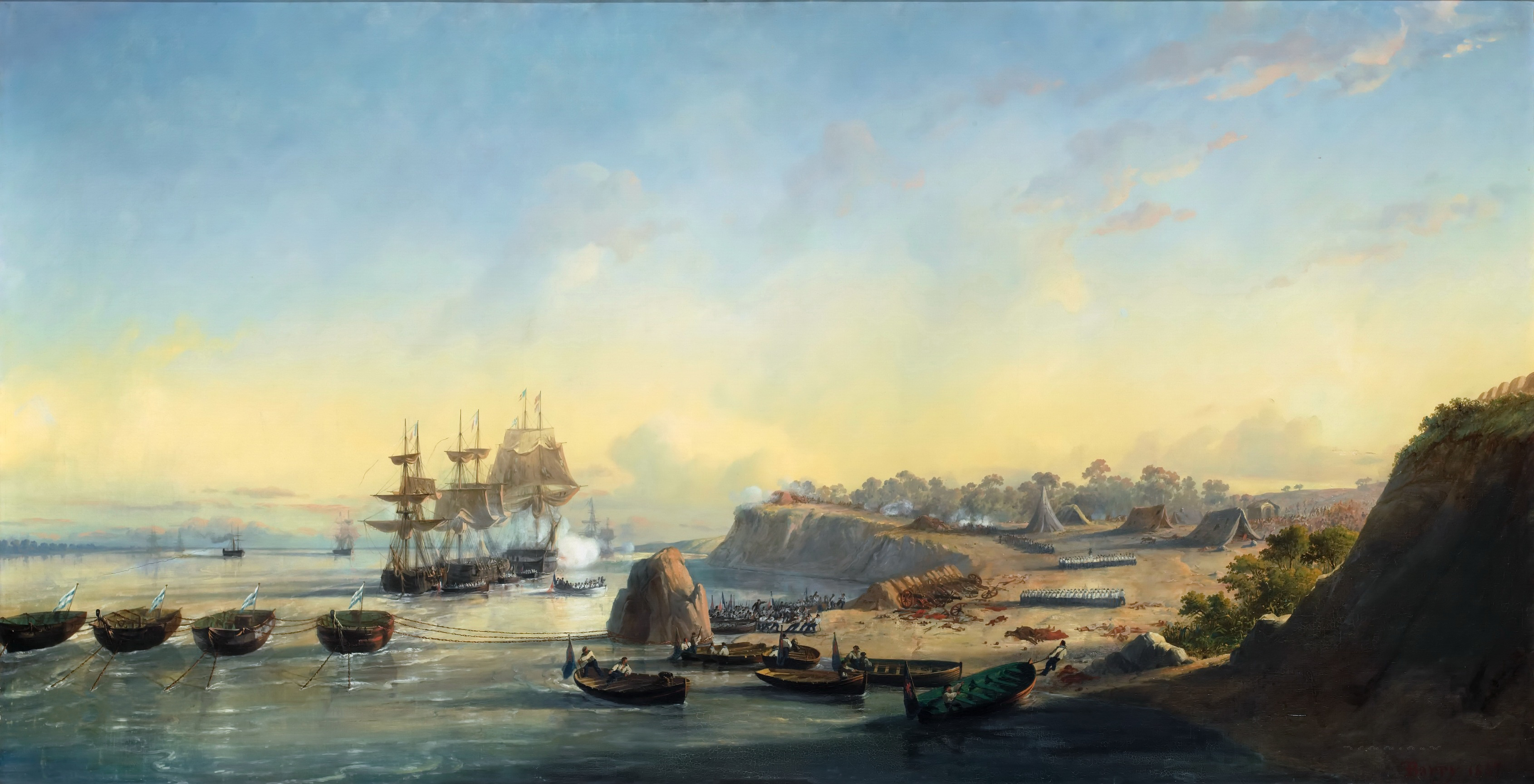
The Battle of Vuelta de Obligado in November 1845 at which Hope was present

Born the son of Rear-Admiral Sir George Johnstone Hope and Lady Jemima Hope Johnstone (daughter of James Hope-Johnstone, 3rd Earl of Hopetoun), Hope entered the Royal Naval College, Portsmouth as a cadet in August 1820. He was appointed to the fifth-rate HMS Forte on the North America and West Indies Station and then transferred to the fourth-rate HMS Cambrian in the Mediterranean Fleet. Promoted to lieutenant on 9 March 1827, he joined the fifth-rate HMS Maidstone on the East Indies Station in September 1827. He became flag lieutenant to the Commander-in-Chief, Portsmouth in August 1829 and, having been promoted to commander on 26 February 1830, he became commanding officer of the sloop HMS Racer on the North America and West Indies Station in July 1833.

Promoted to captain on 28 June 1838, Hope became commanding officer of the paddle steamer HMS Firebrand on the South America Station in December 1844 and was present at the Battle of Vuelta de Obligado in November 1845 during the Uruguayan Civil War. At Punta Obligado, under heavy fire, he supervised the cutting of the chain that defended the Paraná River. He was appointed a Companion of the Order of the Bath on 3 April 1846.

Hope went on to be commanding officer of the steam frigate HMS Terrible in the Mediterranean Fleet in November 1849 and then commanding officer of the second-rate HMS Majestic at Sheerness in February 1854. In HMS Majestic he saw action in the Baltic Sea during the Crimean War.

== Senior command ==
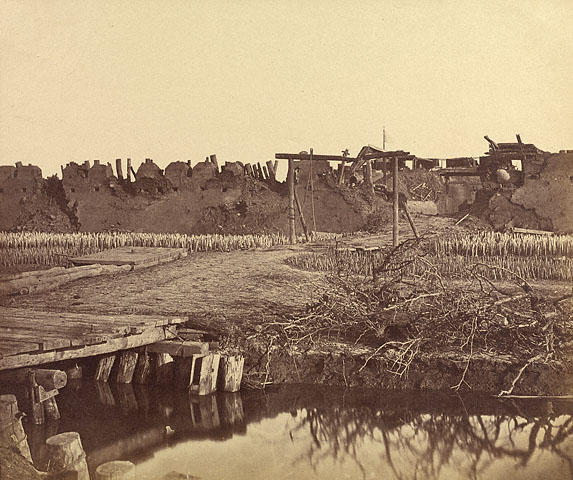
The North Fort on the Hai River which Hope was unable to secure

Promoted to rear admiral on 19 November 1857, Hope became Commander-in-Chief, East Indies and China Station, with his flag in the frigate HMS Chesapeake in March 1859. When the Chinese authorities refused to allow British and French ministers to travel to Peking, Hope was instructed to force the Hai River. He assembled a squadron of eleven gunboats and other vessels and, at the Second Battle of the Taku Forts, he led an assault on the forts at the mouth of the river in June 1859 in a resumption of the Second Opium War. However the forts had been strengthened and the squadron encountered firm resistance from the Chinese defenders: Hope was forced to retreat. In addition to the loss of three British gunboats and some British prestige, a total of 89 British officers and men were killed and 345 were wounded. During the engagement Commodore Josiah Tattnall III, commanding the steamer Toey-Wan of the United States Navy, a neutral party in the war, provided assistance with the evacuation of the dead and wounded, justifying his involvement with the comment "blood is thicker than water". Hope himself was severely wounded in the engagement.

The dispute with the Chinese authorities was only resolved when the British Government sent an army, under Lieutenant General Sir James Hope Grant, to take the forts by overwhelming force: the Third Battle of the Taku Forts in August 1860 was an Anglo-French victory: Hope provided the covering fire for the disembarkation of the troops and was advanced to Knight Commander of the Order of the Bath on 9 November 1860. He was also awarded the French Legion of Honour, Second Class on 29 October 1861.

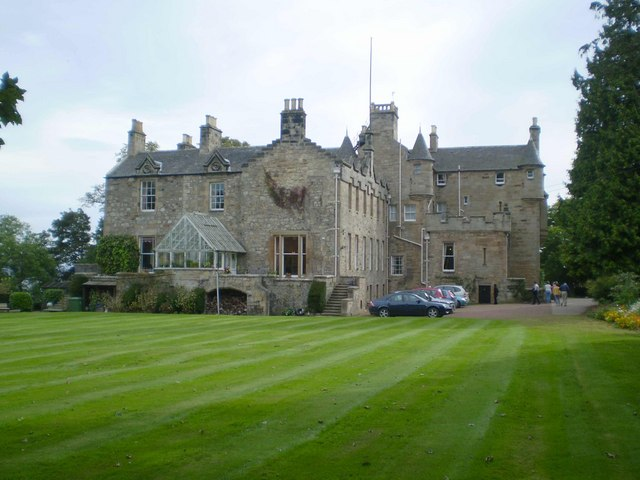
Carriden House, Hope's home near Bo'ness

In March 1861 the Russians attempted to establish a year-round anchorage on the coast of the island of Tsushima, a Japanese territory located between Kyushu and Korea, in what became known as in the Tsushima Incident. Hope arrived with two British warships in August 1861 and forced the Russian corvette Posadnik to withdraw. In February 1862 accompanied by Alexander Michie, he provided assistance to the Imperial Chinese Army in putting down the Taiping Rebellion.

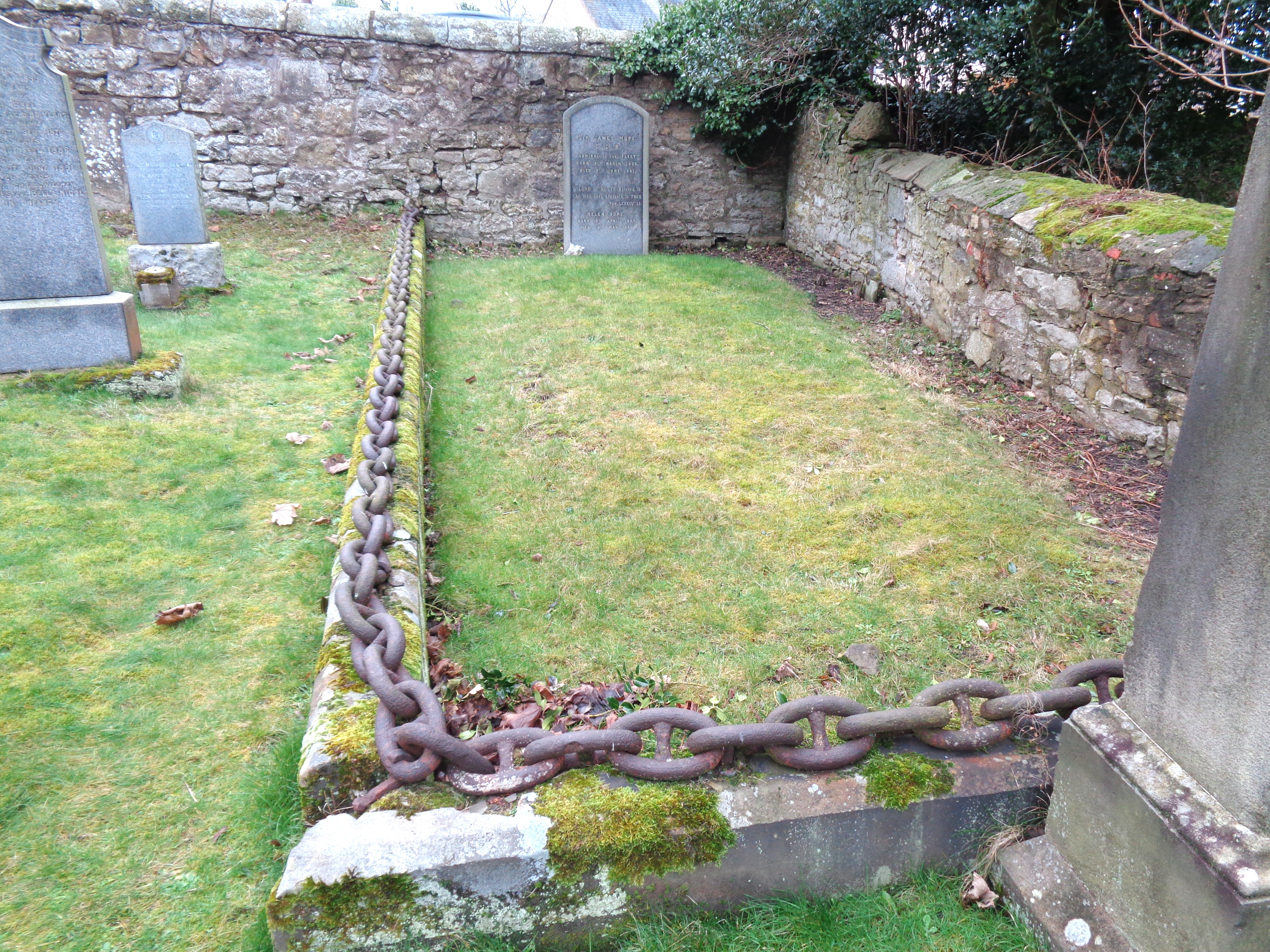
The grave site of Sir James at the old Carriden Church with a warship's chain.

Hope became Commander-in-Chief, North America and West Indies Station, with his flag in the first-rate HMS Duncan, in January 1864. He was promoted to vice admiral on 16 September 1864 and advanced to Knight Grand Cross of the Order of the Bath on 28 March 1865. He went on to be Commander-in-Chief, Portsmouth in February 1869 and, having been promoted to full admiral on 21 January 1870, he was appointed First and Principal Naval Aide-de-Camp to the Queen on 8 February 1873. He retired in March 1878 and, after being promoted to Admiral of the Fleet on 15 June 1879, died at his home, Carriden House near Bo'ness, on 9 June 1881.

== Family ==
On 16 August 1838 Hope married Frederica Kinnaird, daughter of Charles Kinnaird, 8th Lord Kinnaird. After his first wife died on 27 May 1856, he married Elizabeth Reid Cotton, daughter of General Sir Arthur Cotton, on 6 December 1877. There were no children from either marriage.

== See also ==
- O'Byrne, William Richard (1849). "Hope, James" . A Naval Biographical Dictionary . John Murray – via Wikisource.

== Sources ==
- Auslin, Michael (2006). Negotiating with Imperialism: The Unequal Treaties and the Culture of Japanese Diplomacy. Harvard University Press. ISBN 978-0674022270.
- Heathcote, Tony (2002). The British Admirals of the Fleet 1734 – 1995. Pen & Sword. ISBN 0-85052-835-6.

Military offices
Preceded by Sir Michael Seymour	Commander-in-Chief, East Indies and China Station; 1859–1862	Succeeded by Sir Augustus Kuper
Preceded by Sir Alexander Milne	Commander-in-Chief, North America and West Indies Station; 1864–1867	Succeeded by Sir Rodney Mundy
Preceded by Sir Thomas Pasley	Commander-in-Chief, Portsmouth; 1869–1872	Succeeded by Sir Rodney Mundy
Honorary titles
Preceded by The Earl of Lauderdale	First and Principal Naval Aide-de-Camp; 1873–1878	Succeeded by Hon. Sir Henry Keppel
