= Sengge Rinchen =

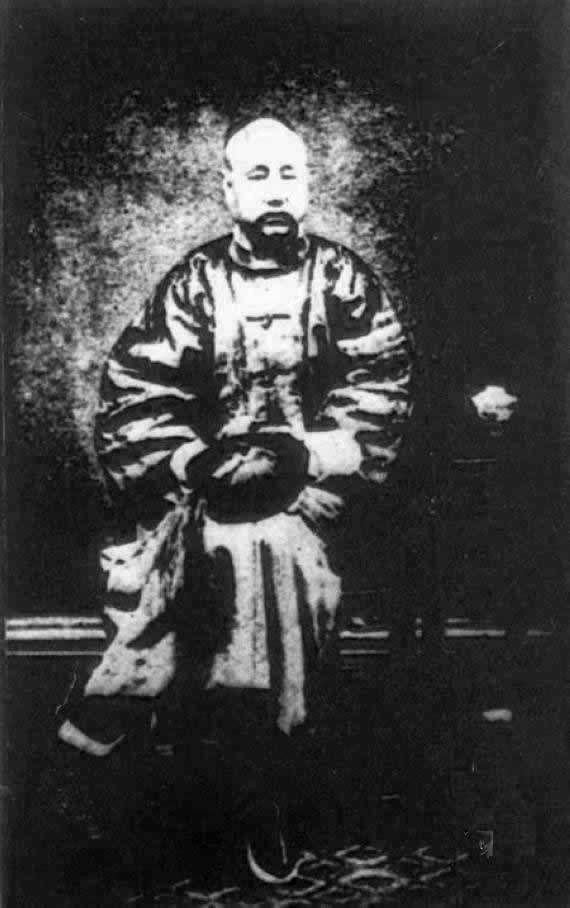

Jasagh & Prince Bodlogotoi of the Horqin Left Rear Banner (Prince of First Rank)
- Reign: 1854–1865
- Predecessor: lifted from Prince of Second Rank
- Successor: Buyannemekü

Jasagh & Prince of the Horqin Left Rear Banner (Prince of Second Rank)
- Reign: 1825–1854
- Predecessor: Sodnamdorji
- Successor: lifted to Prince of First Rank
- Born: 24 July 1811; Horqin Left Rear Banner, Inner Mongolia, Qing China
- Died: 18 May 1865 (aged 53); Heze County, Caozhou Prefecture, Shandong, Qing China
- Burial: 1865; Gongzhuling Village, Sijiazi District, Faku County, Liaoning Province, China

Chinese name
- Chinese: 僧格林沁
Transcriptions
Standard Mandarin
- Hanyu Pinyin: Sēnggélínqìn
- Wade–Giles: Seng-ko-lin-ch'in

Mongolian name
- Mongolian script: ᠰᠡᠩᠭᠡᠷᠢᠨᠴᠢᠨ
Transcriptions
- SASM/GNC: Sengerinchen

Manchu name
- Manchu script: ᠰᡝᠩᡤᡝᡵᡳᠨᠴᡳᠨ
- Romanization: senggerincin

Sengge Rinchen (24 July 1811 – 18 May 1865) or Senggelinqin (Mongolian: Сэнгэринчен) was a Mongol nobleman and general who served under the Qing dynasty during the reigns of the Daoguang, Xianfeng and Tongzhi emperors. He is best known for his role at the Battle of Taku Forts and at the Battle of Baliqiao during the Second Opium War and his contributions in helping the Qing Empire suppress the Taiping and Nian rebellions.

== Background ==
Sengge Rinchen was from the Horqin Left Back Banner in Inner Mongolia and was a member of the Borjigin clan. He was a 26th generation descendant of Qasar, a brother of Genghis Khan. His name is made up of two Tibetan words, "Sengge" (Tibetan: སེང་གེ་) and "Rinchen" (Tibetan: རིན་ཆེན་), which mean "lion" and "treasure" respectively. When he was a child, he was adopted by Sodnamdorji (Содномдорж, 索特納木多布濟), a jasagh of the Horqin Left Back Banner and junwang (郡王; Prince of the Second Rank) under the Qing Empire. He inherited his adoptive father's position and princely title in 1825 during the reign of the Daoguang Emperor.

== Military career ==
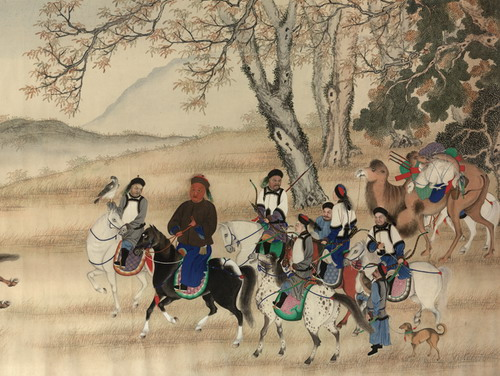
Sengge Rinchen leading troops to battle

In 1853, during the reign of the Xianfeng Emperor, Sengge Rinchen led Qing forces to attack the Taiping rebels of the Northern Expedition in the southern suburbs of Tianjin and defeated them. In 1855, in recognition of his achievements, the Qing imperial court granted him the hereditary title "Prince Bodlogotoi" (Бодлоготой чин ван, 博多勒噶台親王). In the same year, he repelled an attack on Fengguan Garrison (馮官屯; northeast of present-day Chiping County, Liaocheng, Shandong) by the Taiping rebel general Li Kaifang (李開芳) and captured him alive.

In 1857, after the Second Opium War broke out, Sengge Rinchen was appointed as an Imperial Commissioner to take charge of defence arrangements in Tianjin. Two years later, after defeating the British and French at the Second Battle of the Dagu Forts, he and Li Chaoyi (李朝儀) oversaw the construction of artillery batteries in Ninghe, Yingcheng (營城) and the Dagu Forts to resist an invasion. In 1860, after the British and French defeated Qing forces at the Third Battle of the Dagu Forts and occupied Tianjin, Sengge Rinchen and his army retreated to Tongzhou. When an Anglo-French delegation led by Harry Smith Parkes and Henry Loch showed up in Tongzhou for peace negotiations with Prince Yi and other Qing representatives, Sengge Rinchen ordered the delegation to be arrested and sent to Beijing, where most of them (excluding Parkes and Loch) died of disease or torture. During the Battle of Baliqiao, he led his elite Mongol cavalry to attack the Anglo-French forces but was utterly defeated and his cavalry was almost completely wiped out. After entering Beijing, Lord Elgin (the British High Commissioner to China) ordered the British and French troops to burn down the Old Summer Palace in retaliation for the torture and deaths of the delegation. Sengge Rinchen was stripped of his nobility title for his failure to drive back the invaders, but retained his appointment as Imperial Commissioner.

== Death ==
=== Gaolou Fort ===
When the Qing imperial court received news of the Nian Rebellion, Sengge Rinchen was ordered to lead troops to Shandong, Henan and Anhui to suppress the rebellion. In 1865, during the Battle of Gaolou Fort, he was ambushed in a tavern near Gaolou Fort (高樓寨) in Heze, Shandong by Nian rebels led by Lai Wenguang and Song Jingshi. He attempted to escape with some of his horsemen and take shelter in the woods but was killed by a minor rebel leader, Zhang Pigeng.

=== Aftermath ===
Shortly after Sengge Rinchen was killed in battle, news of his death reached Beijing, shocking the Qing court. The emperor ordered imperial guards to escort his coffin back to the capital by express relay and suspended court sessions for three days as a sign of mourning and respect.

Sengge Rinchen was the last military commander of the Qing dynasty of Manchu-Mongol origin. After his death, Empress Dowager Cixi appointed Zeng Guofan to lead the campaign against the Nian rebels. From that point onward, military authority increasingly shifted to Han Chinese generals such as Zeng Guofan of the Xiang Army and Li Hongzhang of the Huai Army, marking a significant transition in Qing military leadership during the late dynasty.

== Legacy ==
The Qing imperial court sent couriers to retrieve and transport Sengge Rinchen's remains back to Beijing, in addition to not holding any court sessions for three days as a mark of mourning. The Tongzhi Emperor, accompanied by the empress dowagers Ci'an and Cixi, personally attended the funeral and ordered a shrine to be erected to commemorate Sengge Rinchen. The shrine, called "Xianzhongci" (顯忠祠; "Shrine of Displaying Loyalty"), used to stand at the current location of Kuanjie Primary School (寬街小學) in Beijing's Dongcheng District.

Sengge Rinchen's loyalty to the Qing Empire is interpreted in official histories of the People's Republic of China as an expression of Chinese patriotism. In 1995, the local government in Tongliao, Inner Mongolia opened a Sengge Rinchen Memorial Museum.

Sengge Rinchen was well known among foreigners in China: British soldiers nicknamed him "Sam Collinson" by mispronouncing his name in Mandarin.

== Family ==
Sengge Rinchen was survived by his son, Buyannemekü (Буяннэмэх, 伯彥訥謨祜; 1836–91), who inherited his princely title. Buyannemekü's eldest son, Nersu (Нарс, 那爾蘇; 1855–90), held the title of a beile and married the eldest daughter of Yixuan, Prince Chun. Nersu was, in turn, succeeded by his son, Amurlingkui (Амарлингуй, 阿穆爾靈圭; 1886–1930). Buyannemekü had five other sons, three of whom became lamas. His sixth son, Bodisu (Бодис, 博迪蘇; 1871–1914), was briefly a senator in the National Assembly at the beginning of the Republican era.
