= Taku Forts =

Historic forts in Binhai, Tianjin, China

- Binhai, Tianjin
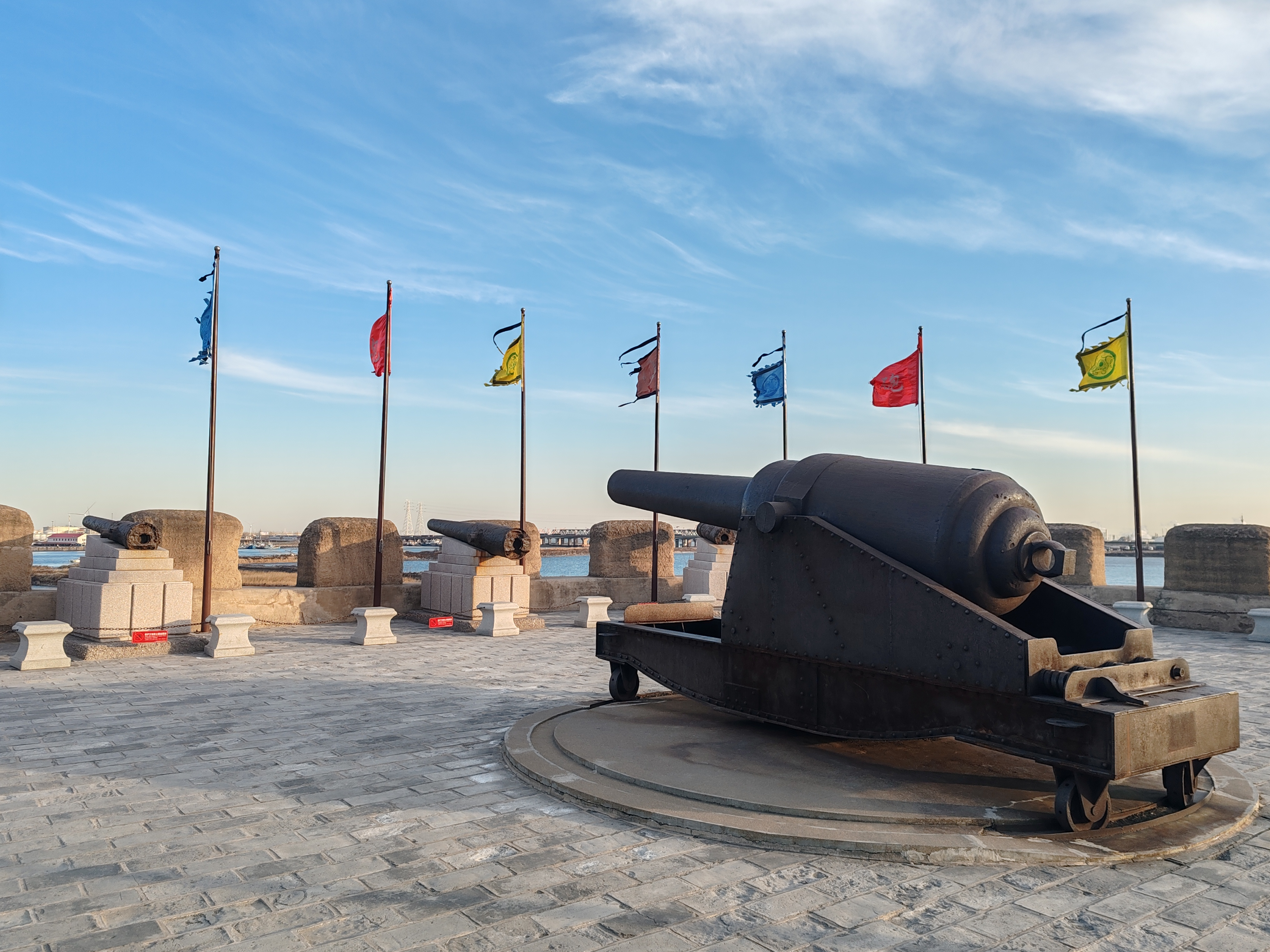
- Battery of Wei

Site information
- Type: Coastal Defense
- Controlled by: Government of Binhai
- Open to the public: yes

Location
- Location in Tianjin Taku Forts (China)
- Coordinates: 38°58′37.4″N 117°42′19.3″E

Site history
- Built: 1522
- Built by: Qi Jiguang
- In use: 1527
- Demolished: 1900 (mostly demolished)
- Battles/wars: First Opium War; Second Opium War; Boxer Rebellion

Taku Forts
- Simplified Chinese: 大沽口炮台
- Traditional Chinese: 大沽口砲臺
- Literal meaning: Dagu mouth batteries
Transcriptions
Standard Mandarin
- Hanyu Pinyin: Dàgūkǒu Pàotái

Peiho Forts
- Simplified Chinese: 白河碉堡
- Traditional Chinese: 白河碉堡
Transcriptions
Standard Mandarin
- Hanyu Pinyin: Báihé Diāobǎo

The Taku Forts or Dagukou Forts (大沽口炮台), also called the Peiho Forts are forts located by the Hai River (Peiho River) estuary in the Binhai New Area, Tianjin, in northeastern China. They are located 60 km (37 mi) southeast of the Tianjin urban center.

In 1988 the Dagukou Forts were added to the 3rd Batch of National Priority Protected Sites, and was open to the public in 1997.

== History ==
=== Construction ===
The first fort was built during the reign of the Ming Jiajing Emperor between 1522 and 1527 by the local military governor Qi Jiguang. Its purpose was to protect Tianjin from attack by wokou sea raiders.

Later, in 1816, the Qing government built the first two forts on both sides of the Haihe estuary in response to increased concerns about seaborne threats from the West. By 1841, in response to the First Opium War, the defensive system in Dagukou was reinforced into a system of five big forts, 13 earthen batteries, and 13 earthworks. In 1851, Imperial Commissioner Sengge Rinchen carried out a comprehensive renovation of the forts, building 6 large forts: two on the south of the estuary, called "Wēi" (威-Might) and "Zhèn" (震-Thunder, Tremor, Quake), three to the north, "Hǎi" (海-sea), "Mén" (门-gate) "Gāo" (高-high), and the sixth, the "Shitoufeng" (石头缝-Stone Seam) Fort, was built on a small ridge on the northern shore. Each fort had three large guns and 20 small caliber guns. Forts were constructed of wood and brick with an external curtain of two feet of concrete, the layering designed to avoid spalling and minimize penetration by artillery rounds. The forts were around 10 to 15 meters (33 to 49 ft) high, which located as they were in an exceedingly flat landscape, provided a critical vantage point.

=== Second Opium War ===
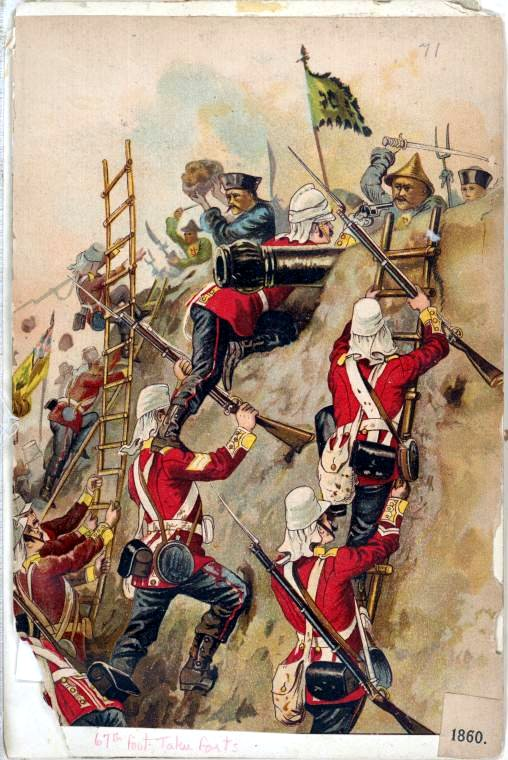
67th Foot of the British Army taking the Taku Forts in 1860.

In 1856, Chinese soldiers boarded The Arrow, a Chinese-owned ship registered in Hong Kong flying the British flag and suspected of piracy, smuggling and of being engaged in the opium trade. They captured 12 men and imprisoned them. Though the certificate allowing the ship to fly a British flag had expired, there was still an armed response. The British and French sent gunboats under the command of Admiral Sir Michael Seymour to capture the Taku Forts in May 1858. In June 1858, at the end of the first part of the Second Opium War, the Treaties of Tianjin were signed, which opened Tianjin to foreign trade.

In 1859, after China refused to allow the setting up of foreign legations in Beijing, a naval force under the command of British Admiral Sir James Hope attacked the forts guarding the mouth of the Hai River. During the action, US Navy Commodore Josiah Tattnall III, who later served in the Confederate Navy during the American Civil War, came to the assistance of the British gunboat HMS Plover, offering to take off their wounded. Plover's commander, Rear Admiral James Hope, accepted the offer and a launch was sent to take off the wounded. Later, Tattnall discovered that some of his men were black from powder flashes. When asked, the men replied that the British had been short handed with the bow gun. His famous report sent to Washington claimed "Blood is thicker than water". This was the first time the British troops needed American assistance after suffering major casualties from the Taku cannon barrage, and the first time that British and independent American troops fought side by side.

In 1860, an Anglo-French force gathered at Hong Kong and then carried out a landing at Pei Tang on August 1, and a successful assault on the Taku Forts on August 21 after which Hospital Apprentice Andrew Fitzgibbon of the Indian Medical Establishment became the youngest recipient of the Victoria Cross at the age of 15 years and 3 months. The forts were severely mauled and General Sengge Rinchen's troops were forced to withdraw. On September 26, the force arrived at Beijing and had captured the city by October 13.

=== Boxer Rebellion ===
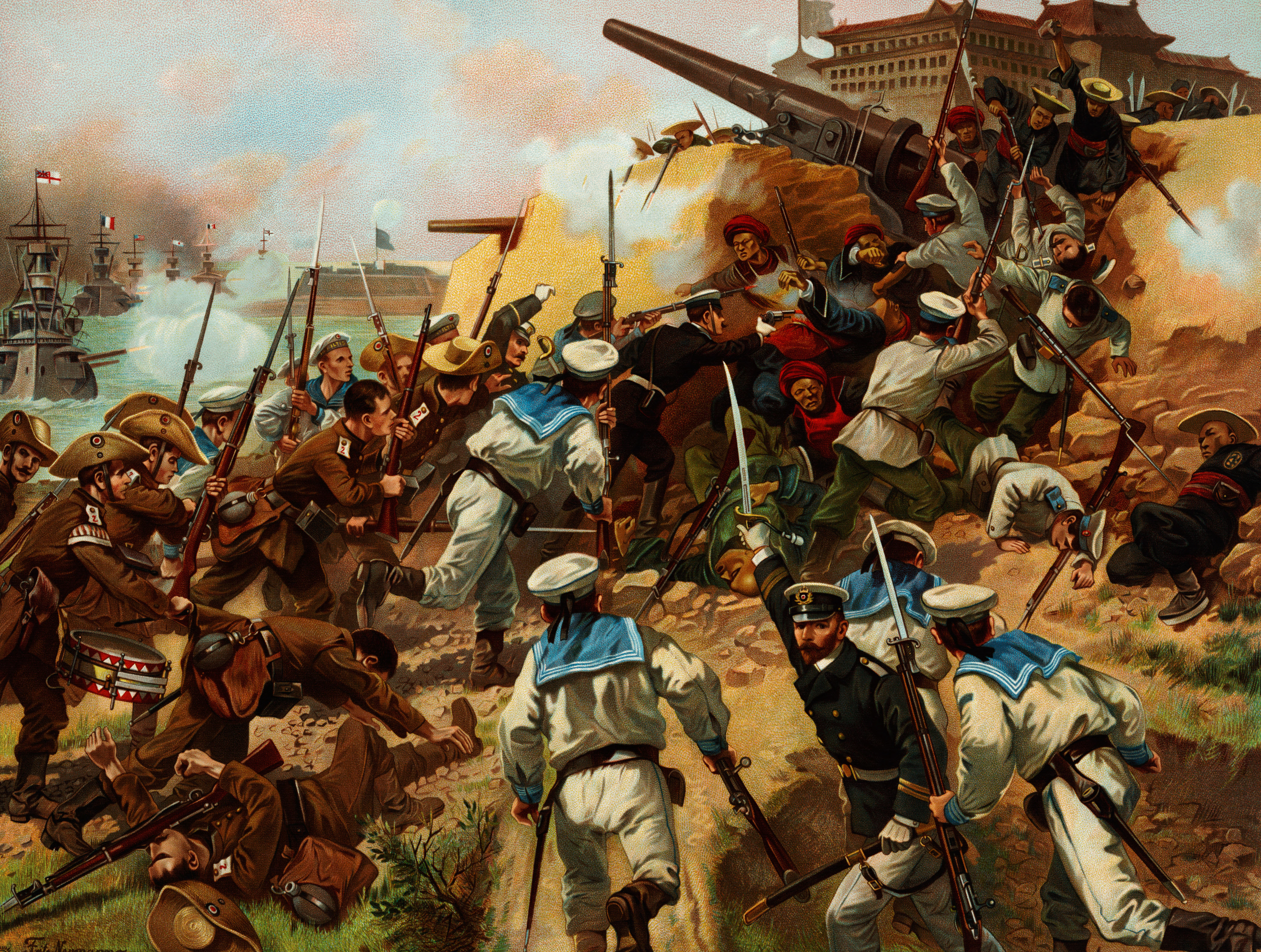
The Capture of the Forts at Taku by Fritz Neumann

After the Battle of Taku Forts, most of the forts were dismantled when the Eight-Nation Alliance Forces invaded China during the Boxer Rebellion (1899–1901). Two forts remain today, one on the southern bank (the former "Wei" fort) and the other on the northern bank of the Hai River (the former "Hai" fort). Dagu Fort (on the southern bank) was repaired in 1988 and opened to the public in June 1997. Land reclamation has left it some considerable distance from the modern shoreline. Its restoration has not returned it to anything like the appearance it would have had when it was an active gun battery (see photo of the aftermath of the 1860 attack), but a number of cannons have been placed in the reconstructed gun embrasures to hint at its former use. An exhibition in Chinese recounts the history of the Opium Wars and the forts' role in them. Unrestored forts are visible to its north from Haifang Road.

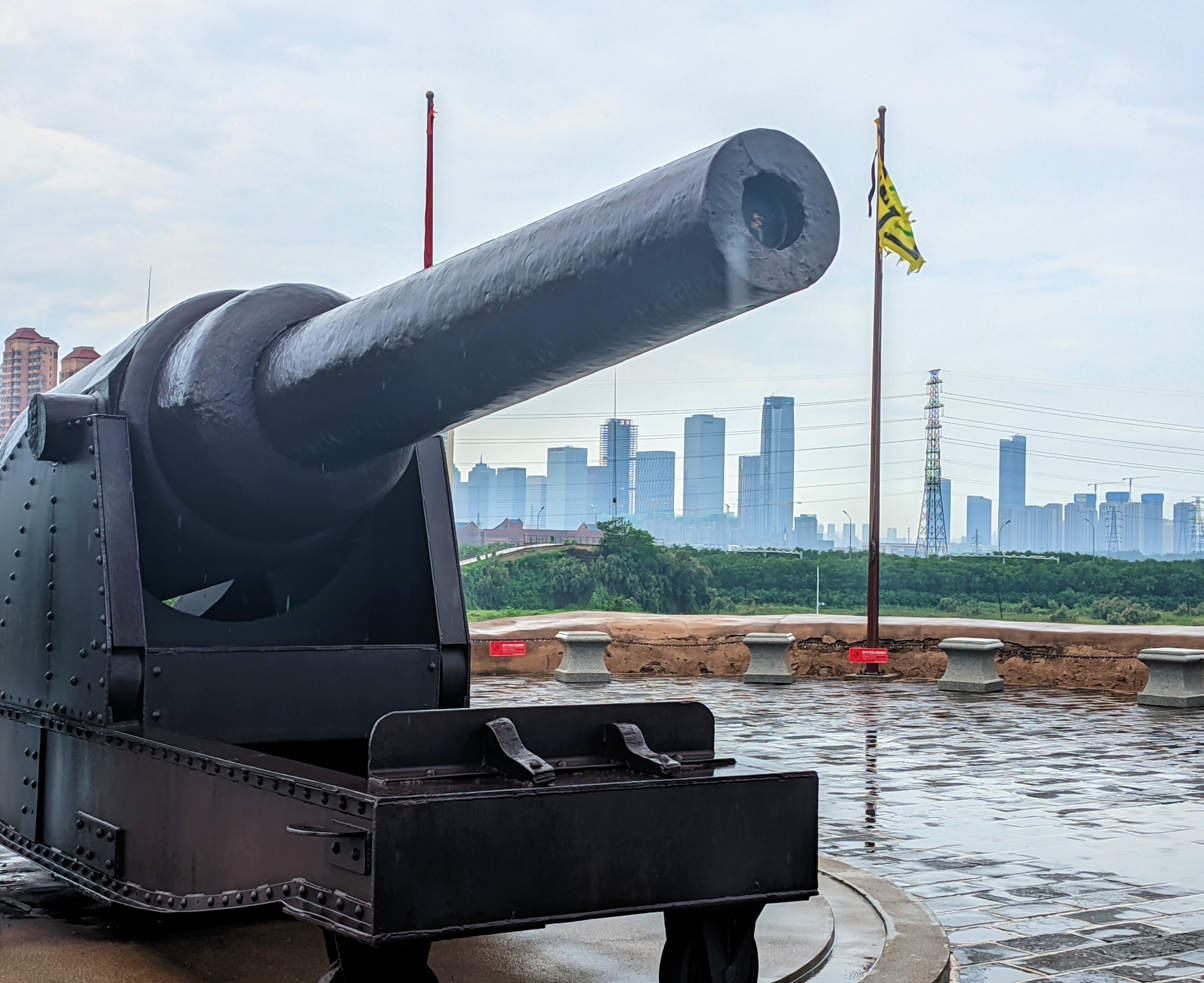
The current Taku Forts

== Gallery ==
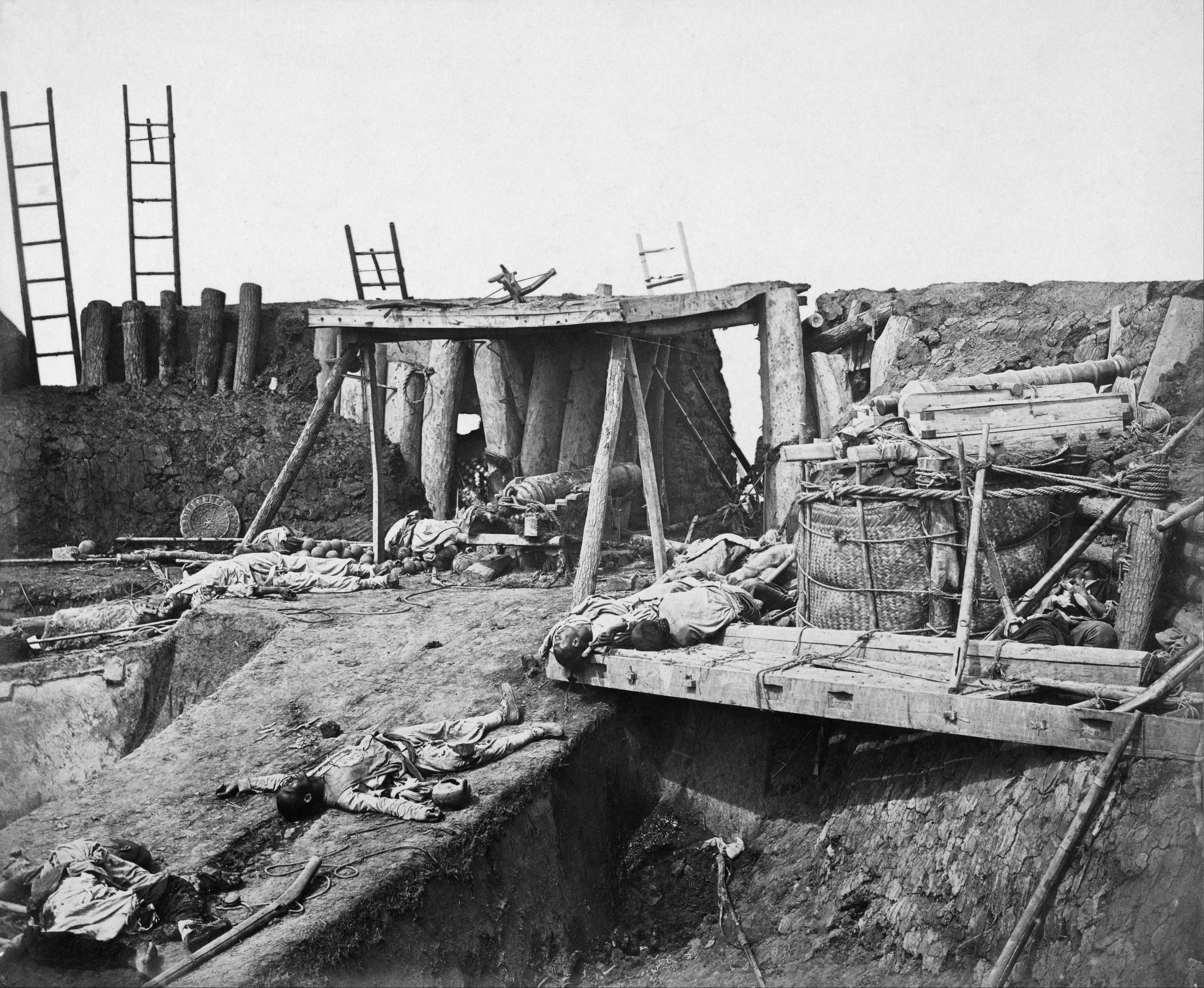
Interior of Angle of North Fort Immediately after Its Capture, 21 August 1860

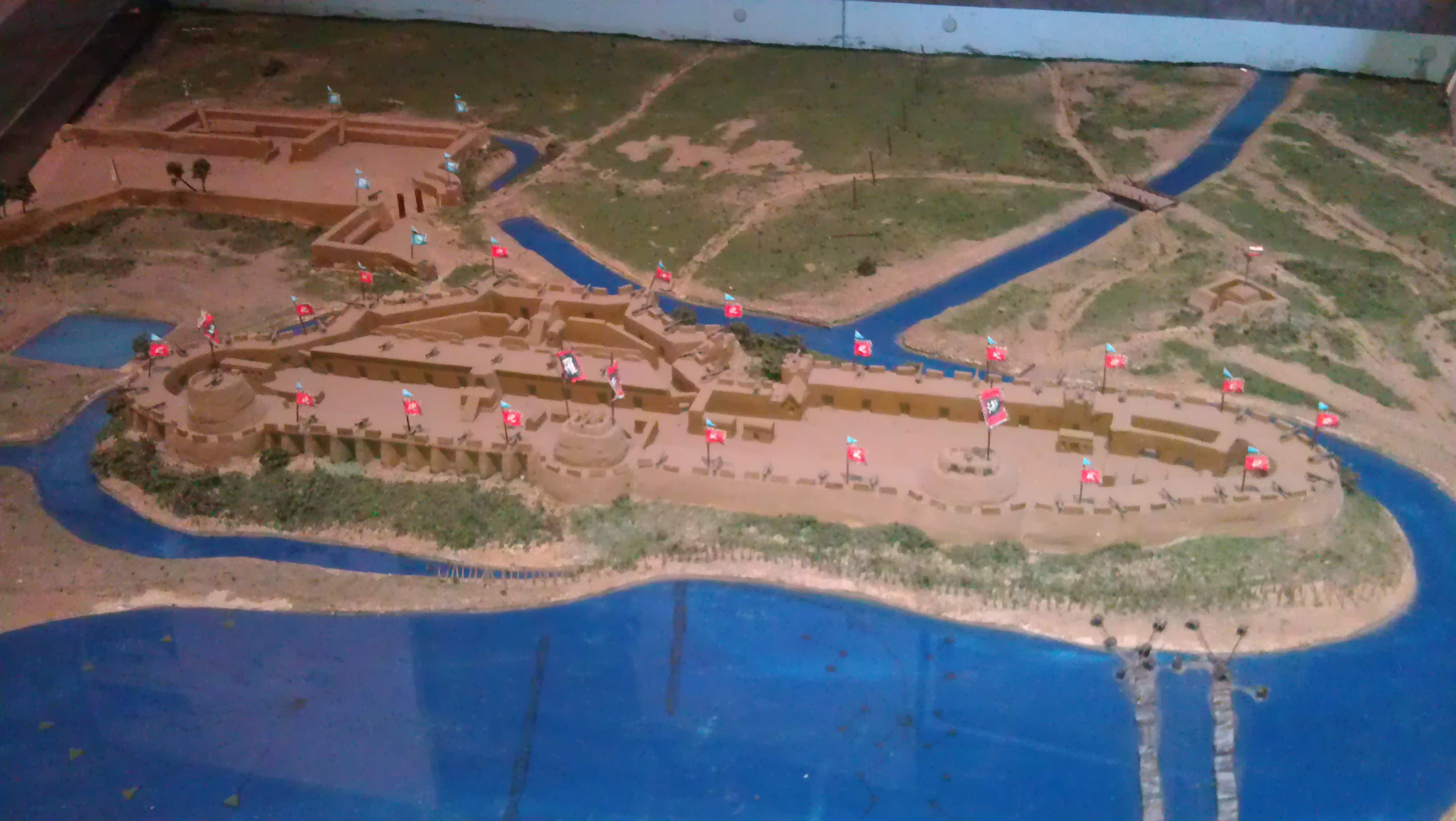
Model of the Taku Forts in the Dagukou Fort Ruins Museum, Tanggu, China.

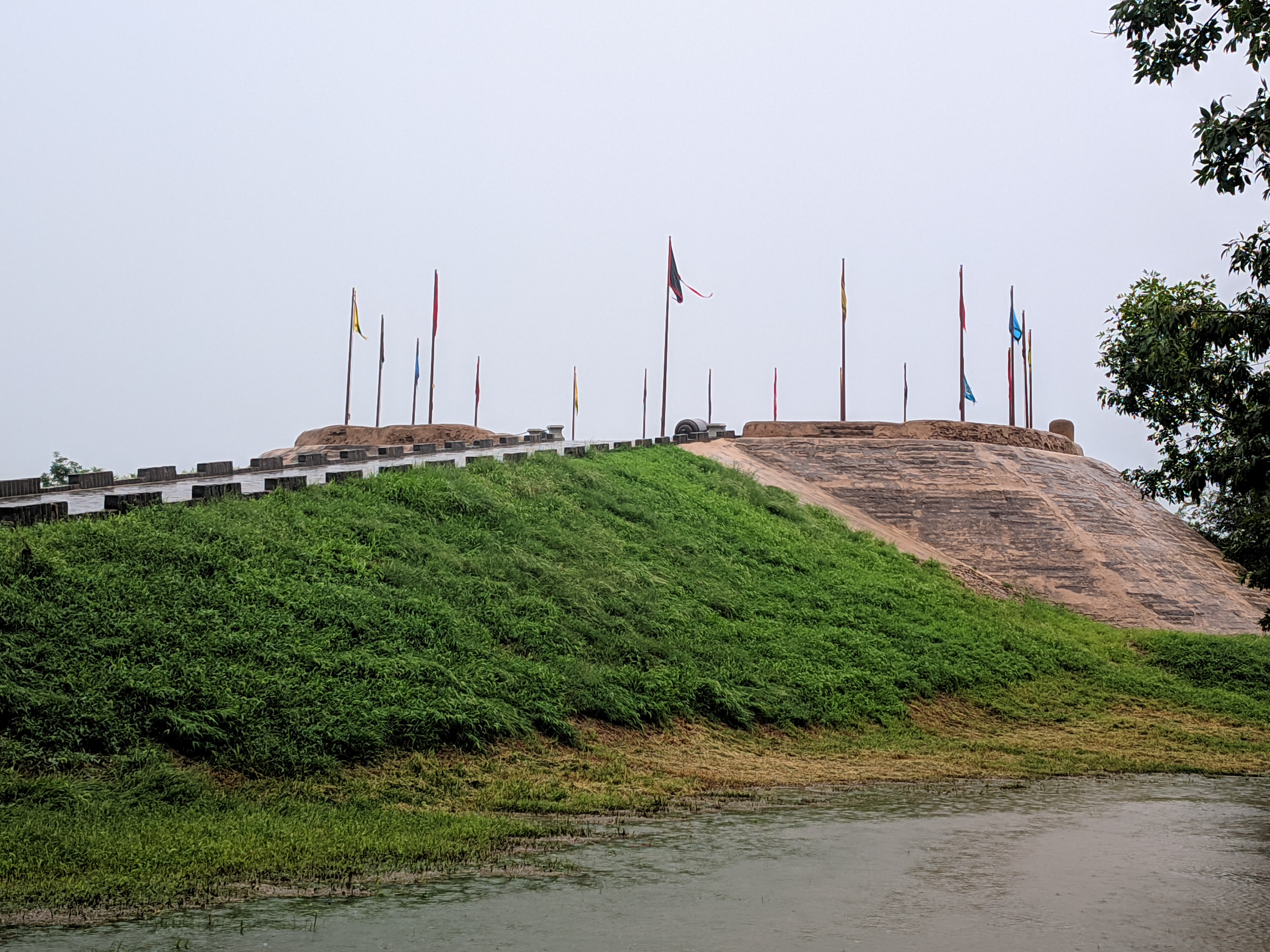
View of the gun platform from outside the defensive works.

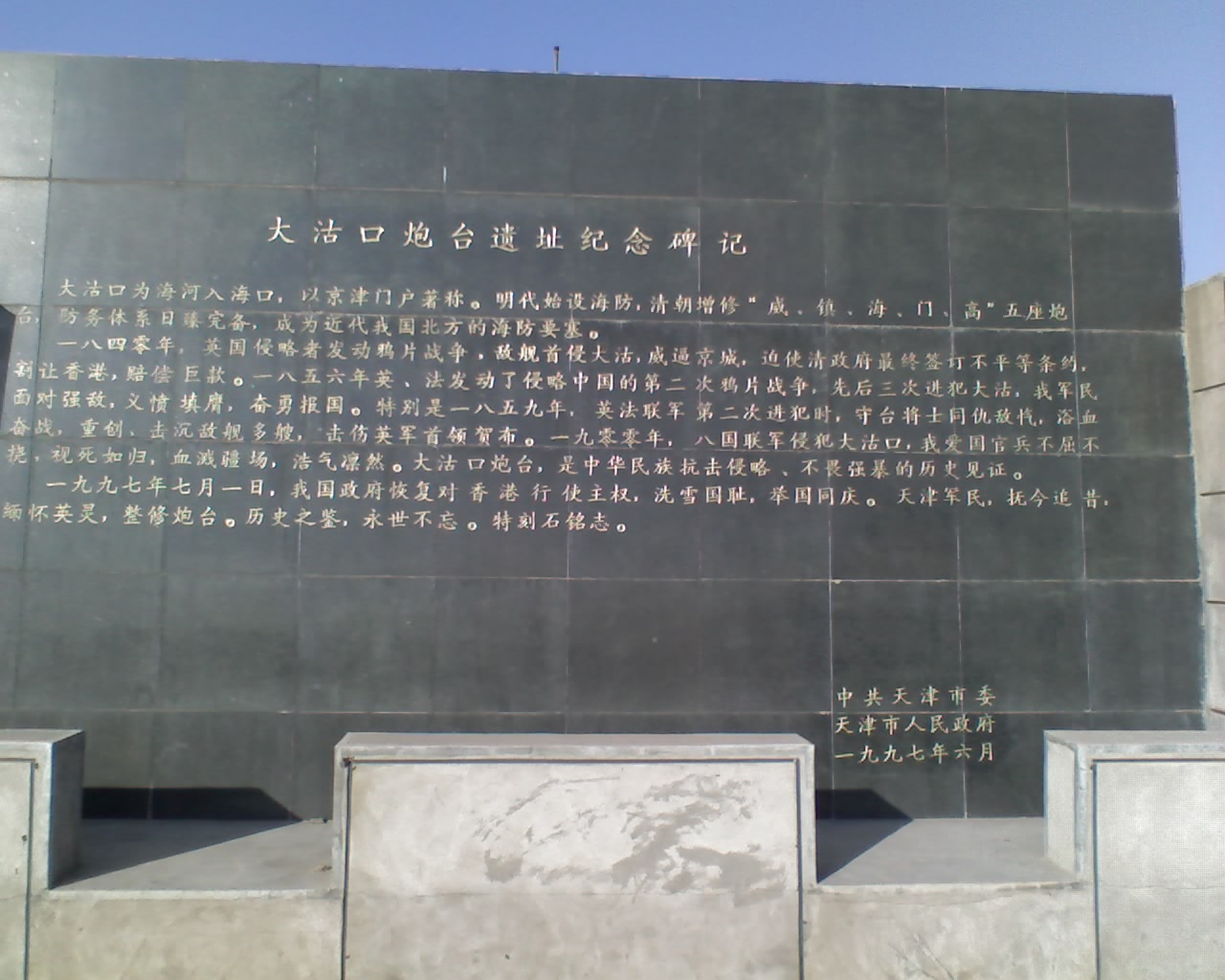
Dedication plaque at the Dagukou Fort Ruins Museum.

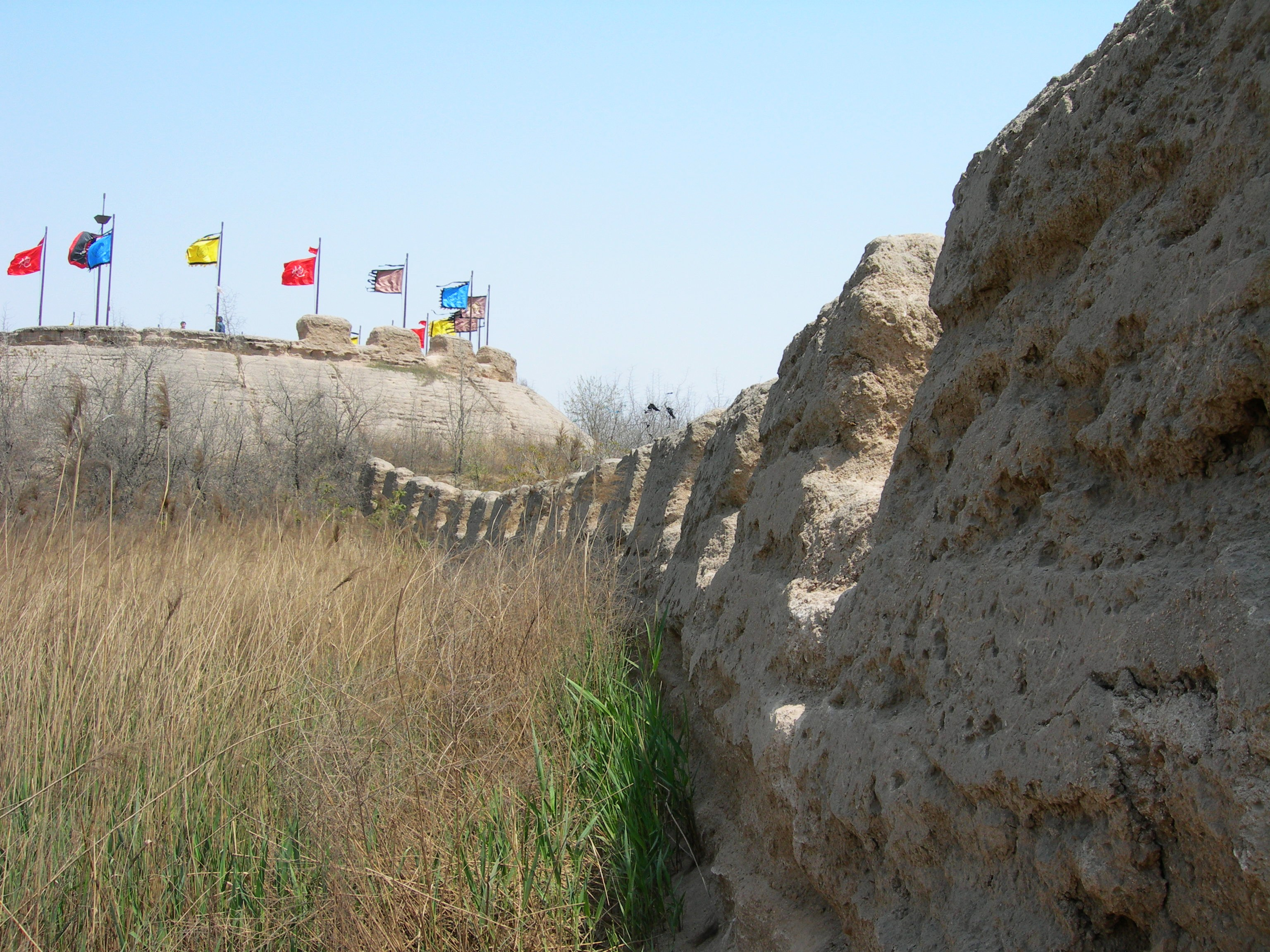
View from inside the defensive works.

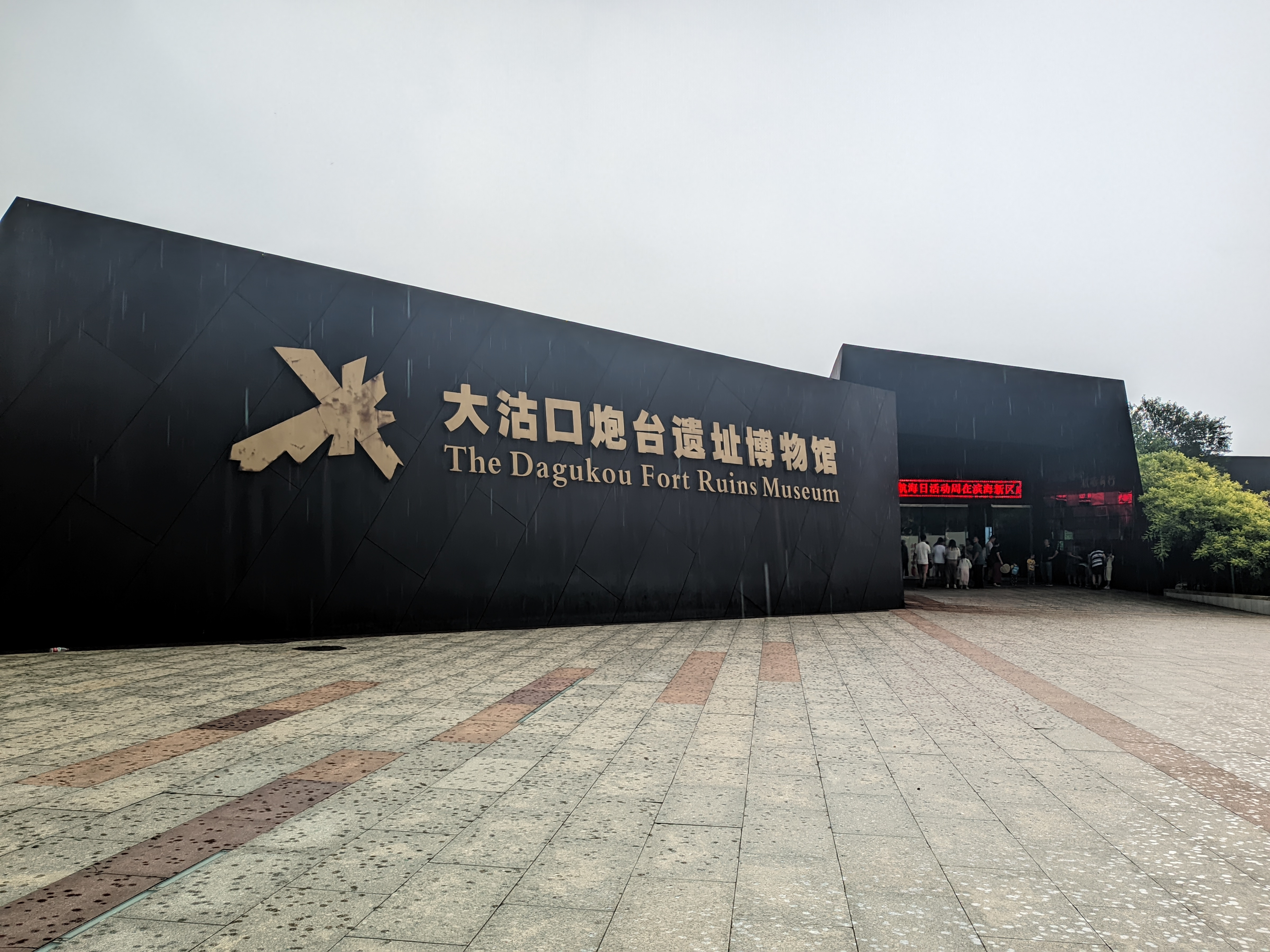
Dagu Forts Museum
