= Battle of Taku Forts (1858) =

Battle of the Second Opium War

Coordinates: 38°58′29.50″N 117°42′43.80″E

First Battle of Taku Forts
- Part of the Second Opium War
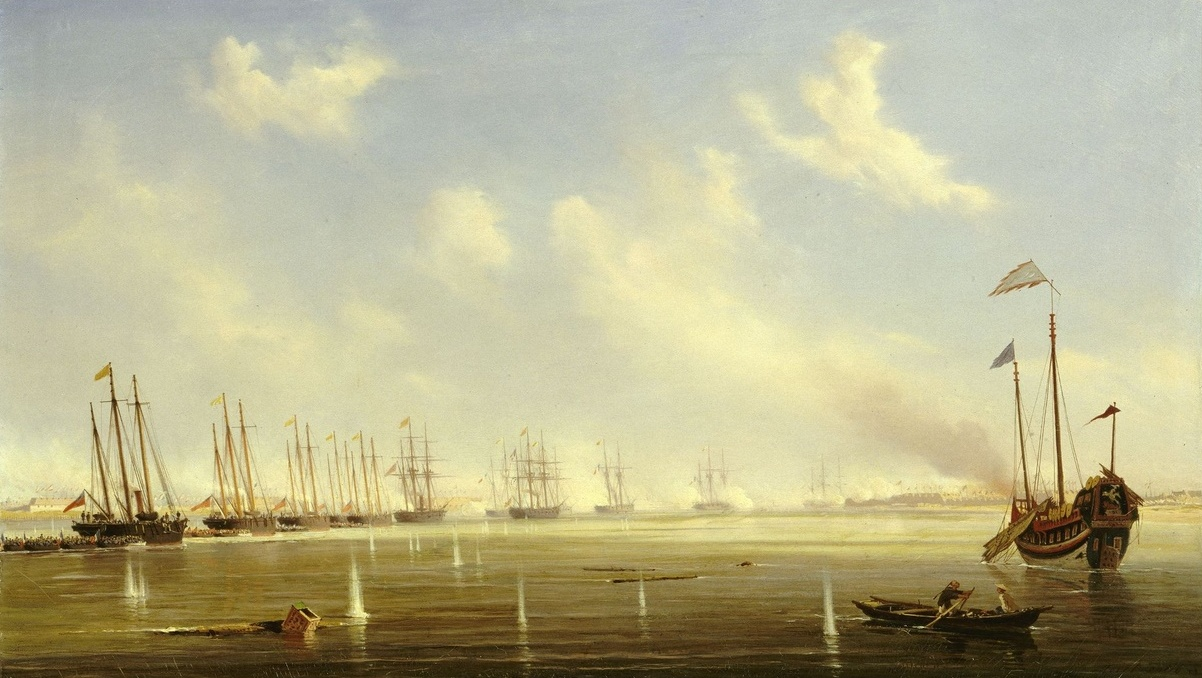
- Attack and capture of the forts of Peï-Ho, 20 May 1858; Antoine Léon Morel-Fatio, 1867
Date	20 May 1858
Location	Taku Forts, Tianjin, China
Result	Anglo-French victory

Belligerents
United Kingdom; France	Qing China

Commanders and leaders
(United Kingdom) Michael Seymour (Second French Empire) Charles Rigault de Genouilly	Tan Ting-siang

Strength
British: 1,032; French: 700 (land force)	1,000

Casualties and losses
British: 5 killed 16 wounded French: 6 killed 61 wounded	Unknown

The First Battle of Taku Forts (Chinese: 第一次大沽口之戰) was the first attack of the Anglo-French alliance against the Taku Forts along the Hai River in Tianjin, China, on 20 May 1858, during the Second Opium War.

The British and French sent a squadron of gunboats, under Rear-Admiral Admiral Michael Seymour, to attack China's Taku Forts. The battle ended as an allied success. However, the first phase of the Second Opium War would end with the Treaties of Tianjin and the forts were returned to the hands of the Qing Army, leading to the Second Battle of Taku Forts in 1859.

== Background ==
After the beginning of the Second Opium War, the Anglo-French alliance captured the significant harbor of Canton (Guangzhou) during the Battle of Canton in 1857. The Xianfeng Emperor received the news that Canton had been occupied on 27 January 1858. The British commander Michael Seymour, hoping to force a settlement (the later Treaty of Tianjin), ordered an attack on the Taku Forts as they were the closer path towards Peking. The fortresses were then stormed by British and French troops.

British soldiers who fought in the battle were awarded the Second China War Medal with the clasp "Taku Forts 1858".
