= Horqin Left Rear Banner =

Horqin Left Rear Banner 科尔沁左翼后旗 • ᠬᠣᠷᠴᠢᠨ ᠵᠡᠭᠦᠨ ᠭᠠᠷᠤᠨ ᠬᠣᠶᠢᠲᠤ ᠬᠣᠰᠢᠭᠤ
- Banner
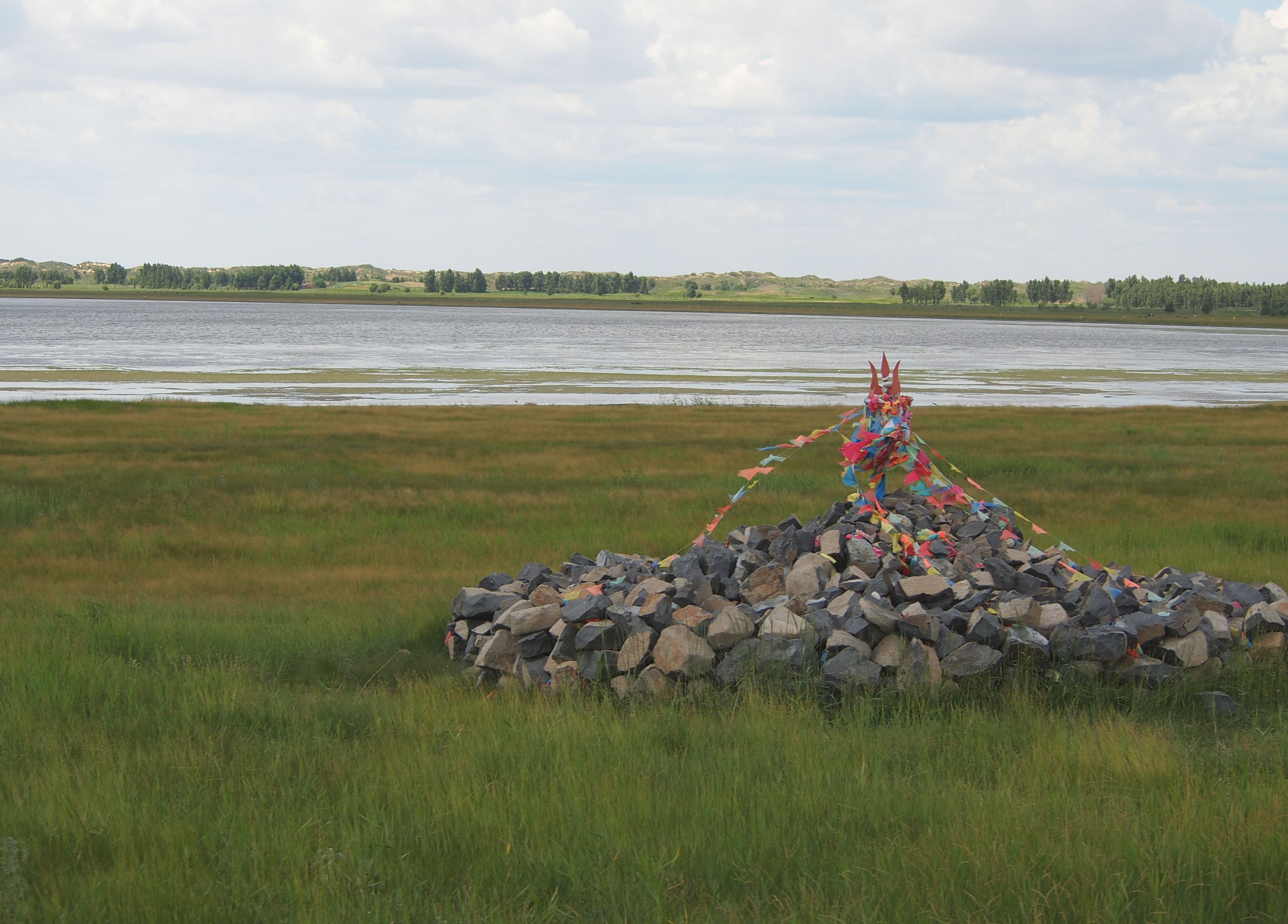
- Grasslands near Agula Town

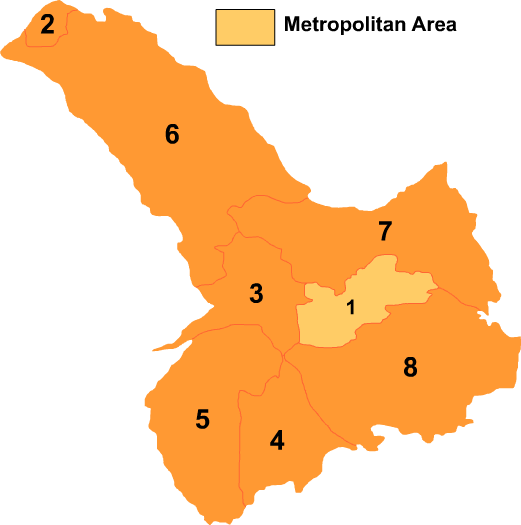
- Tongliao divisions: Horqin Left Rear Banner is 8 on this map

- Location of the seat in Inner Mongolia Horqin LRB (China)
- Coordinates: 42°57′N 122°21′E
- Country: China
- Autonomous region: Inner Mongolia
- Prefecture-level city: Tongliao
- Banner seat: Ganjig

Area
  - Total: 11,500 km^{2} (4,400 sq mi)
- Elevation: 250 m (820 ft)

Population (2020)
  - Total: 321,438
  - Density: 28.0/km^{2} (72.4/sq mi)
- Time zone: UTC+8 (China Standard)
- Website: www.houqi.gov.cn

Horqin Left Rear Banner

Chinese name
- Simplified Chinese: 科尔沁左翼后旗
- Traditional Chinese: 科爾沁左翼後旗
Transcriptions
Standard Mandarin
- Hanyu Pinyin: Kē'ěrqìn Zuǒyì Hòuqí

Mongolian name
- Mongolian Cyrillic: Хорчин зүүн гарын хойд хошуу
- Mongolian script: ᠬᠣᠷᠴᠢᠨ ᠵᠡᠭᠦᠨ ᠭᠠᠷᠤᠨ ᠬᠣᠶᠢᠲᠤ ᠬᠣᠰᠢᠭᠤ
Transcriptions
- SASM/GNC: Hôrqin Juun'garin Hôid Hôxûû

Horqin Left Rear Banner (Mongolian: ᠬᠣᠷᠴᠢᠨ ᠵᠡᠭᠦᠨ ᠭᠠᠷᠤᠨ ᠬᠣᠶᠢᠲᠤ ᠬᠣᠰᠢᠭᠤ (Note: Transliteration: Qorčin Jegün Ɣarun Qoyitu Qosiɣu); Chinese: 科尔沁左翼后旗, original Mongolian name Büve vang qosigu) is a banner of southeastern Inner Mongolia, China, bordering Liaoning province to the south. It is under the administration of Tongliao City, 75 kilometres (47 mi) to the north and its banner seat is the town of Ganjig. The local Mongolian dialect is Khorchin Mongolian.

== Demographics ==
The proportion of nationalities in Horqin Left Rear Banner (2020)
Nationality	Percentage
Mongols	72.0%
Han	26.2%
Manchus	1.5%
Hui People	0.2%
Koreans	0.1%
Others	0.0%
Source of the population statistics :

== Administrative divisions ==
Horqin Left Rear Banner is made up of 10 towns, 1 township and 5 sums.

Name	Simplified Chinese	Hanyu Pinyin	Mongolian (Hudum Script)	Mongolian (Cyrillic)	Administrative division code
Towns
Ganjig Town	甘旗卡镇	Gānqíkǎ Zhèn	ᠭᠠᠨᠵᠤᠭ᠎ᠠ ᠪᠠᠯᠭᠠᠰᠤ	Ганзага балгас	150522100
Jargalang Town	吉尔嘎朗镇	Jí'ěrgālǎng Zhèn	ᠵᠢᠷᠭᠠᠯᠠᠩ ᠪᠠᠯᠭᠠᠰᠤ	Жаргалан балгас	150522101
Jinbaotun Town	金宝屯镇	Jīnbǎotún Zhèn	ᠵᠢᠨ ᠪᠣᠣ ᠲᠦᠨ ᠪᠠᠯᠭᠠᠰᠤ	Гийн буу түн балгас	150522102
Changsheng Town	常胜镇	Chángshèng Zhèn	ᠴᠠᠩ ᠱᠧᠩ ᠪᠠᠯᠭᠠᠰᠤ	Цан шен балгас	150522103
Qars Town	查日苏镇	Chárìsū Zhèn	ᠴᠠᠷᠠᠰᠤ ᠪᠠᠯᠭᠠᠰᠤ	Царс балгас	150522104
Shuangsheng Town	双胜镇	Shuāngshèng Zhèn	ᠱᠤᠸᠠᠩ ᠱᠧᠩ ᠪᠠᠯᠭᠠᠰᠤ	Сойн шен балгас	150522105
Ul Town	阿古拉镇	Āgǔlā Zhèn	ᠠᠭᠤᠯᠠ ᠪᠠᠯᠭᠠᠰᠤ	Уул балгас	150522106
Qulut Town	朝鲁吐镇	Cháolǔtǔ Zhèn	ᠴᠢᠯᠠᠭᠤᠲᠤ ᠪᠠᠯᠭᠠᠰᠤ	Чулуут балгас	150522107
Nugustai Town	努古斯台镇	Nǔgǔsītái Zhèn	ᠨᠤᠭᠤᠰᠤᠲᠠᠢ ᠪᠠᠯᠭᠠᠰᠤ	Нугастэй балгас	150522108
Hailiut Town	海鲁吐镇	Hǎilǔtǔ Zhèn	ᠬᠠᠯᠢᠭᠤᠲᠤ ᠪᠠᠯᠭᠠᠰᠤ	Халиут балгас	150522109
Sums
Aduqin Sum	阿都沁苏木	Ādūqìn Sūmù	ᠠᠳᠤᠭᠤᠴᠢᠨ ᠰᠤᠮᠤ	Адуучин сум	150522200
Modot Sum	茂道吐苏木	Màodàotǔ Sūmù	ᠮᠣᠳᠣᠲᠤ ᠰᠤᠮᠤ	Модт сум	150522201
Bag Tal Sum	巴胡塔苏木	Bāhútǎ Sūmù	ᠪᠠᠭᠠᠲᠠᠯ᠎ᠠ ᠰᠤᠮᠤ	Баатал сум	150522202
Sundu Sum	散都苏木	Sǎndū Sūmù	ᠰᠤᠨᠳᠤᠤ ᠰᠤᠮᠤ	Сондуу сум	150522203
Bayan Mod Sum	巴彦毛都苏木	Bāyànmáodū Sūmù	ᠪᠠᠶᠠᠨᠮᠣᠳᠣ ᠰᠤᠮᠤ	Баянмт сум	150522204
Others
Shengli Farm	胜利农场	Shènglì Nóngchǎng	ᠱᠧᠩ ᠯᠢ ᠲᠠᠷᠢᠶᠠᠯᠠᠩ ᠤᠨ ᠲᠠᠯᠠᠪᠠᠢ	Шен ли тариалангийн талбай	150522400
Monggon Daba Pasture	孟根达坝牧场	Mènggēndábà Mùchǎng	ᠮᠥᠩᠭᠥᠨ ᠳᠠᠪᠠᠭ᠎ᠠ ᠮᠠᠯᠵᠢᠯ ᠤᠨ ᠲᠠᠯᠠᠪᠠᠢ	Мөнгөн даваа малжлын талбай	150522401
Xajingtai Pasture	查金台牧场	Chájīntái Mùchǎng	ᠱᠠᠵᠠᠩᠲᠠᠢ ᠮᠠᠯᠵᠢᠯ ᠤᠨ ᠲᠠᠯᠠᠪᠠᠢ	Шаазантай малжлын талбай	150522402
Stock Breeding Center	原种繁育中心	Yuánzhǒng Fányù Zhōngxīn	ᠡᠭᠦᠯᠳᠡᠷ ᠦᠨ ᠦᠷ᠎ᠡ ᠶᠢᠨ ᠲᠠᠯᠠᠪᠠᠢ	Үүлдрийн үрийн талбай	150522403
Daqinggou Administration	大青沟管理局	Dàqīnggōu Guǎnlǐjú	ᠶᠡᠬᠡ ᠴᠦᠩᠬᠦᠯ ᠦᠨ ᠬᠠᠮᠢᠶᠠᠷᠤᠯᠲᠠ ᠶᠢᠨ ᠲᠣᠪᠴᠢᠶ᠎ᠠ	Их цүнхлийн хамааралтын товчоо	150522404
Har Us Breeding Stock Farm	哈日乌苏种畜场	Hārìwūsū Zhǒngchùchǎng	ᠬᠠᠷᠠᠤ᠋ᠰᠤ ᠮᠠᠯᠵᠢᠯ ᠤᠨ ᠲᠠᠯᠠᠪᠠᠢ	Харуус малжлын талбай	150522405
Ulan Od Fishing Farm	乌兰敖道渔场	Wūlán’áodào Yúchǎng	ᠤᠯᠠᠭᠠᠨ᠌ᠣ᠋ᠳᠤ ᠵᠢᠭᠠᠰᠤᠨ ᠲᠠᠯᠠᠪᠠᠢ	Улаанууд загасан талбай	150522406
Jinbaotun Tree Farm	金宝屯林场	Jīnbǎotún Línchǎng	ᠵᠢᠨ ᠪᠣᠣ ᠲᠦᠨ ᠣᠢ ᠲᠠᠯᠠᠪᠠᠢ	Гийн буу түн ой талбай	150522407
Qulut Tree Farm	朝鲁吐林场	Cháolǔtǔ Línchǎng	ᠴᠢᠯᠠᠭᠤᠲᠤ ᠣᠢ ᠶᠢᠨ ᠲᠠᠯᠠᠪᠠᠢ	Чулуут ойн талбай	150522408
Modot Tree Farm	茂道吐林场	Màodàotǔ Línchǎng	ᠮᠣᠳᠣᠲᠤ ᠣᠢ ᠶᠢᠨ ᠲᠠᠯᠠᠪᠠᠢ	Модт ойн талбай	150522409
Ih Tal Tree Farm	伊胡塔林场	Yīhútǎ Línchǎng	ᠶᠡᠬᠡᠲᠠᠯ᠎ᠠ ᠣᠢ ᠶᠢᠨ ᠲᠠᠯᠠᠪᠠᠢ	Ихдэлээ ойн талбай	150522410
Udan Tal Tree Farm	乌旦塔拉林场	Wūdàntǎlā Línchǎng	ᠤᠳᠠᠨᠲᠠᠯ᠎ᠠ ᠣᠢ ᠶᠢᠨ ᠲᠠᠯᠠᠪᠠᠢ	Уднатал ойн талбай	150522411

== Climate ==
Climate data for Horqin Left Rear Banner, elevation 257 m (843 ft), (1991–2020 normals, extremes 1981–present)
Month	Jan	Feb	Mar	Apr	May	Jun	Jul	Aug	Sep	Oct	Nov	Dec	Year
Record high °C (°F)	7.8 (46.0)	16.0 (60.8)	20.4 (68.7)	32.1 (89.8)	34.4 (93.9)	38.2 (100.8)	36.0 (96.8)	37.3 (99.1)	34.4 (93.9)	28.0 (82.4)	19.2 (66.6)	14.1 (57.4)	38.2 (100.8)
Mean daily maximum °C (°F)	−6.4 (20.5)	−1.3 (29.7)	6.1 (43.0)	15.6 (60.1)	22.9 (73.2)	27.0 (80.6)	28.8 (83.8)	27.8 (82.0)	23.3 (73.9)	14.8 (58.6)	3.6 (38.5)	−4.7 (23.5)	13.1 (55.6)
Daily mean °C (°F)	−12.6 (9.3)	−7.9 (17.8)	−0.3 (31.5)	9.1 (48.4)	16.5 (61.7)	21.3 (70.3)	23.9 (75.0)	22.5 (72.5)	16.9 (62.4)	8.3 (46.9)	−2.2 (28.0)	−10.4 (13.3)	7.1 (44.8)
Mean daily minimum °C (°F)	−17.5 (0.5)	−13.3 (8.1)	−6.0 (21.2)	2.9 (37.2)	10.2 (50.4)	15.8 (60.4)	19.4 (66.9)	18.0 (64.4)	11.1 (52.0)	2.8 (37.0)	−7.1 (19.2)	−15.1 (4.8)	1.8 (35.2)
Record low °C (°F)	−32.7 (−26.9)	−27.6 (−17.7)	−18.6 (−1.5)	−9.6 (14.7)	−1.5 (29.3)	2.8 (37.0)	10.9 (51.6)	8.5 (47.3)	−0.9 (30.4)	−12.8 (9.0)	−21.5 (−6.7)	−30.0 (−22.0)	−32.7 (−26.9)
Average precipitation mm (inches)	1.6 (0.06)	1.9 (0.07)	7.7 (0.30)	18.7 (0.74)	41.4 (1.63)	76.0 (2.99)	110.8 (4.36)	98.4 (3.87)	29.5 (1.16)	22.1 (0.87)	8.6 (0.34)	2.7 (0.11)	419.4 (16.5)
Average precipitation days (≥ 0.1 mm)	1.7	1.6	3.2	5.0	7.8	11.8	11.5	9.6	6.3	4.2	2.9	2.8	68.4
Average snowy days	3.2	3.4	3.8	1.9	0	0	0	0	0	1.2	3.5	4.1	21.1
Average relative humidity (%)	54	46	44	42	48	63	74	74	63	55	54	56	56
Mean monthly sunshine hours	217.2	220.6	262.8	254.5	269.2	235.9	206.8	229.0	244.9	229.7	195.2	197.2	2,763
Percentage possible sunshine	74	74	71	63	59	52	45	54	66	68	68	71	64
Source: China Meteorological Administration All-time Oct low
