= Battle of Taku Forts (1860) =

Battle during the Second Opium War

Coordinates: 38°58′29.50″N 117°42′43.80″E

Third Battle of Taku Forts
- Part of the Second Opium War
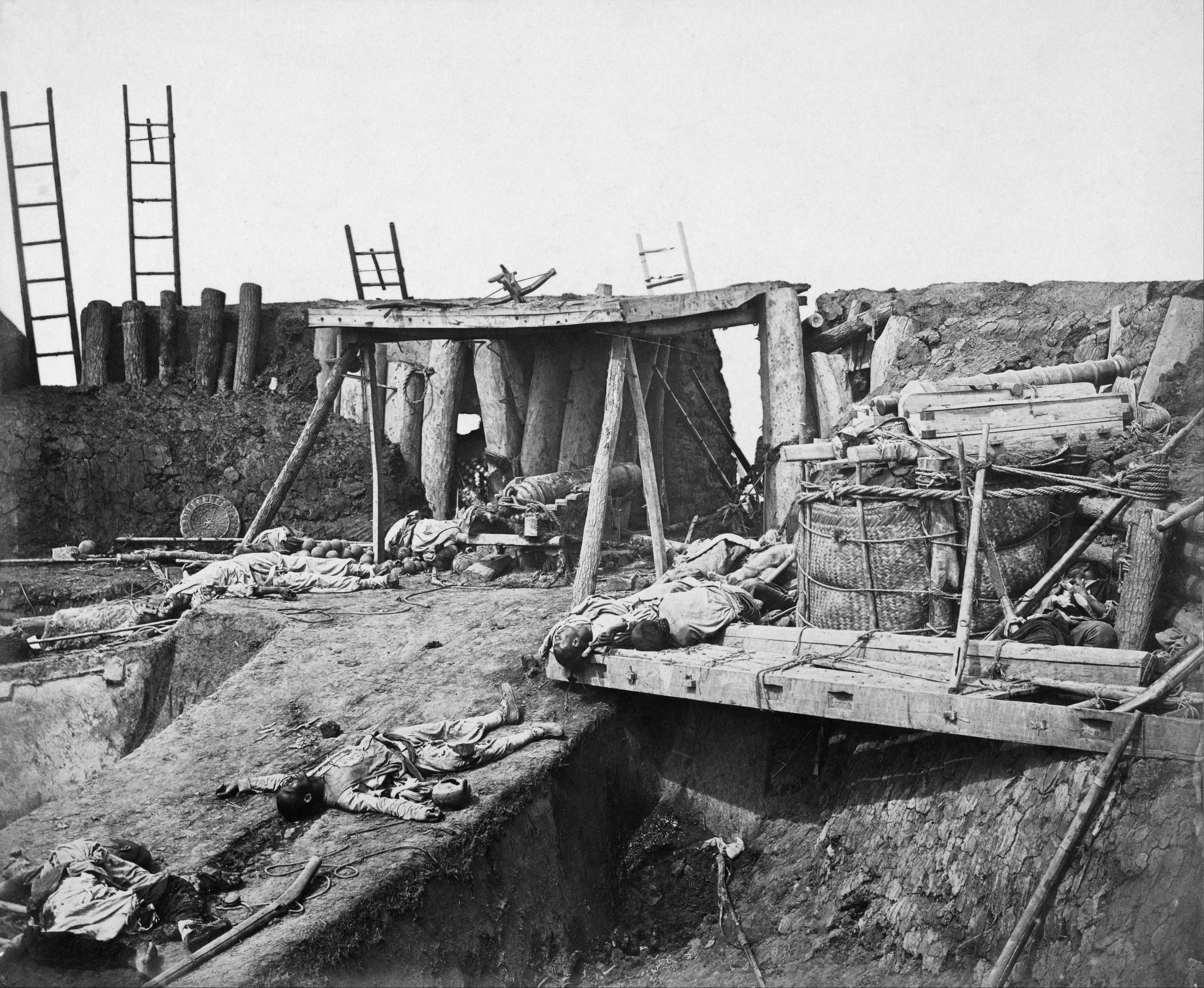
- Interior of the north fort after its capture
| Date | 12–21 August 1860 |
| Location | Taku Forts, Tianjin, China |
| Result | Franco-British victory |

Belligerents
| United Kingdom; France | Qing China |

Commanders and leaders
| (United Kingdom) James Hope Grant (Second French Empire) Charles Cousin-Montauban | Governor Hengfu; Sengge Rinchen; Leshan |

Strength
| British: 10,000 infantry 1,000 cavalry:- Royal Dragoon Guards, Probyn's Horse, Fane's Horse; French: 6,700 | 5,000 infantry, 2,000 cavalry ~45 artillery pieces, 4 forts |

Casualties and losses
| British: 201; French: 158 | ~100 killed, ~300 wounded, ~2,100 captured |

The Third Battle of Taku Forts (Chinese: 第三次大沽口之戰) was an engagement of the Second Opium War, part of the British and French 1860 expedition to China. It took place at the Taku Forts (also called Peiho Forts) near Tanggu District (Wade-Giles: Pei Tang-Ho), approximately 60 kilometers (36 mi.) southeast of the city of Tianjin (Tientsin).

== Background ==
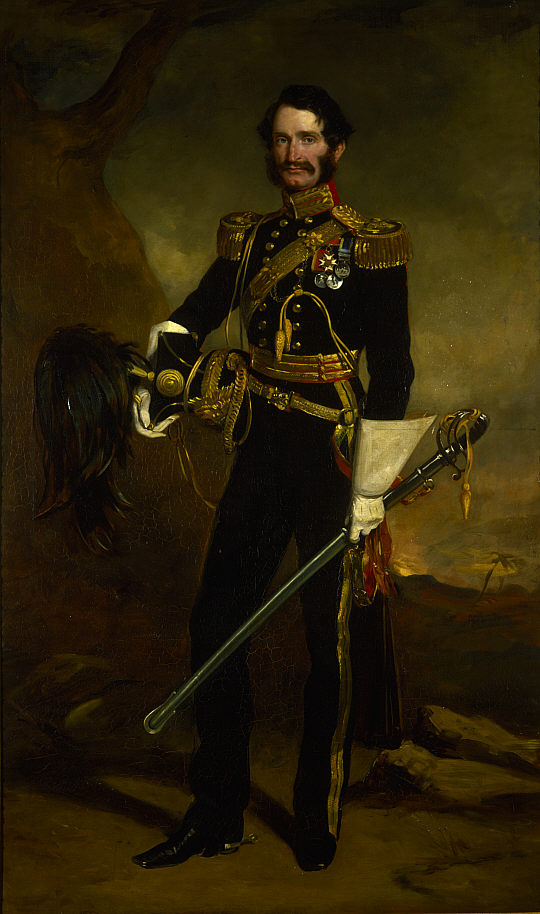
James Hope Grant

The aim of the allied French-British expedition was to compel the Chinese government at Peking to honour the trade treaties signed between their governments at Tianjin (Tientsin) in 1858, which included allowing the British to continue the opium trade in China. Lt-Gen. Sir Hope Grant was the British commander, with Lt-Gen. Charles Cousin-Montauban, Comte de Palikao, in charge of the French. The allied force consisted of 11,000 British including around 1,000 cavalry, as well as 6,700 French troops. The Taku Forts were defended by 7,000 Qing troops, including some 2,000 cavalry. At least 45 artillery pieces were among the Chinese defenders.

A year earlier, a similar attempt had been made to steam up the river, but the Qing forces had constructed a barrier across the river, resulting in the Battle of Taku Forts (1859), which was a disaster for the Anglo-French force.

Following that humiliation, Captain Fisher of the Corps of Royal Engineers and three British ships, Cruiser, Forester, and Starling, were left behind to survey the area on land as well as along the coast. The reports would determine the strategy for the next attempt. The conclusion of the Indian Mutiny had also released troops to reinforce the Hong Kong station.

== Battle ==
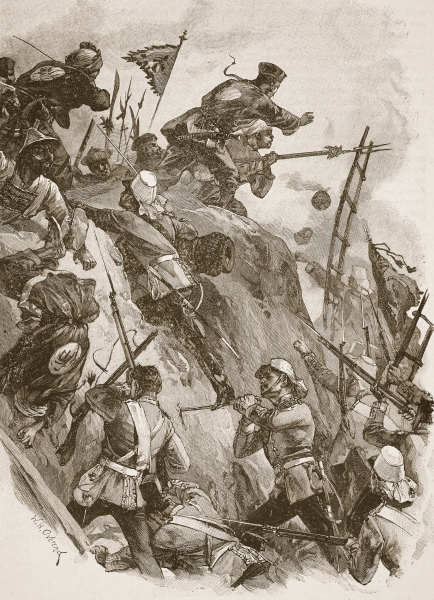
An illustration of Rogers reaching the top of the wall with help from Lieutenant Lenon

Not wanting to have a repeat of the 1859 disaster, on 30 July 1860 the Anglo-French army began landing at Beitang, 10 miles (16 km) to the north of the forts. A few days later, a reconnaissance force moved towards the Taku Forts for close observation; two British soldiers were wounded by bullets from a Chinese jingal. The whole force was ashore by 7 August and a few days later on 12 August, the allied force advanced.

Pushing back enemy forces in front of them, including around 2,000 cavalry, the Anglo-French expedition arrived at the forts. There were four, two on the north and two on the south side. The French wanted to attack the southern forts, but the survey by Fisher indicated that the key was the main northern fort. On 17 August his plan was adopted.

Five batteries were established during the night of 20–21 August with fascines made using the straw walls and roofs of nearby barracks.

1. Battery - 6 × French field-pieces and 1 × 8-inch gun
2. Battery - 3 × 8-inch mortars this battery platform was made from coffin lids which were 6 inches (15 cm) thick.
3. Battery - 2 × 32-pounders and 2 × 8-inch howitzers
4. Battery - 2 × 8-inch guns
5. Battery - 6 × Armstrong guns

Opening fire next morning, it took four hours to crush the fort's artillery. Then the major assault took place on the main Chinese fort, employing two columns, one British and one French.

Heavy fighting ensued as the attackers crossed several Chinese ditches and spiked bamboo palisades.

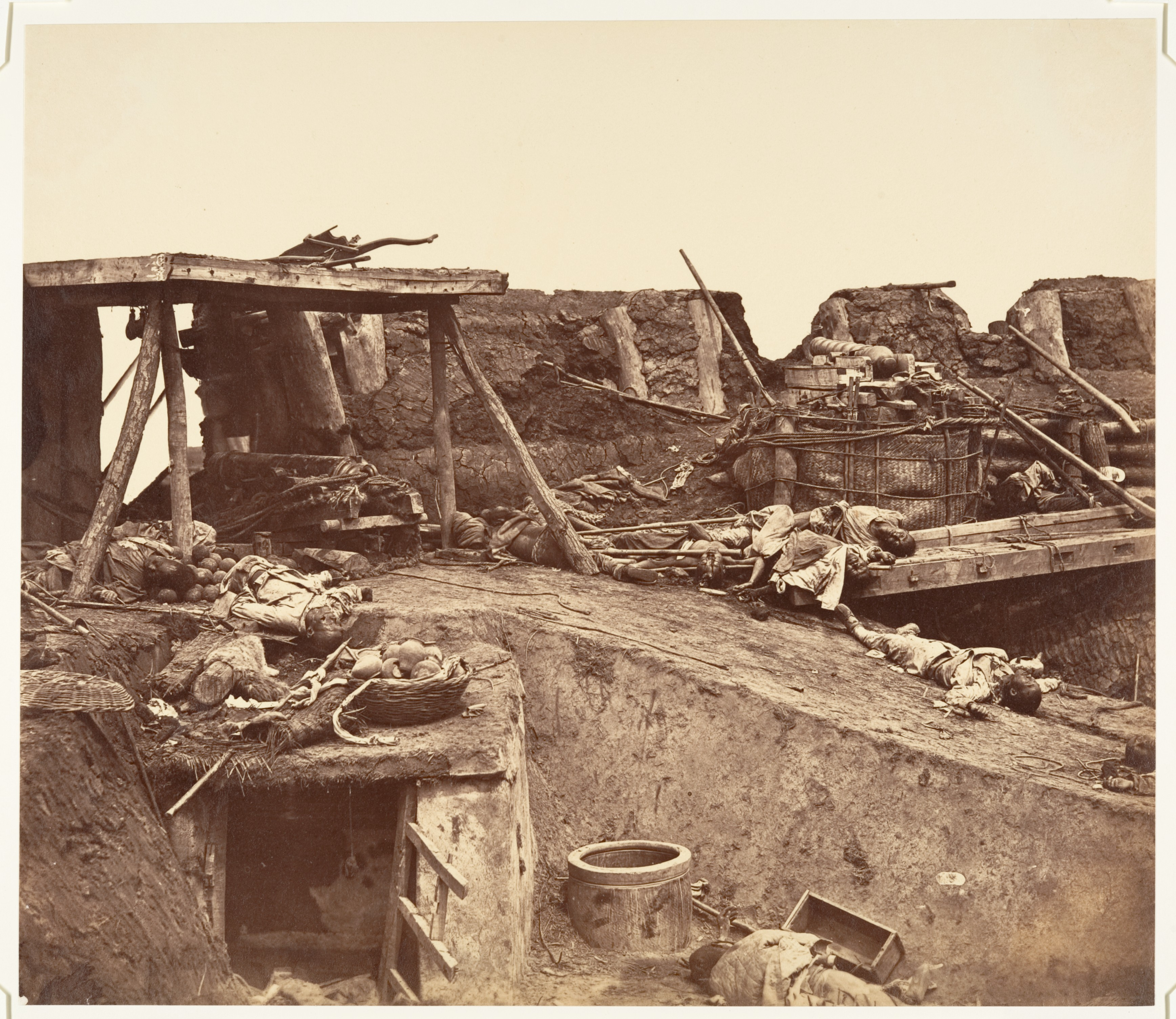
After the Capture of the Taku Forts

The Anglo-French force initially attacked the main gate of the fortifications, but it was found there were two wet ditches and many spikes. An engineer managed to cut the ropes holding up the drawbridge, but it was too heavily damaged by artillery to be effectively used. The main attack was therefore made against the walls using the ladders. The French column managed to get onto the parapet first. The first British officer to enter the fort was Lieutenant Robert Montresor Rogers, who was later awarded the Victoria Cross for his bravery that day. He was closely followed by Private John McDougall, who was also awarded the Victoria Cross. Lieutenants Nathaniel Burslem and Edmund Henry Lenon, Private Thomas Lane and Ensign John Worthy Chaplin of the 67th Foot Hampshire Regiment were also awarded the Victoria Cross for their bravery. Resistance continued inside the fort for three and a half hours before the fort was cleared of defenders.

During the fighting, British forces sustained 201 casualties in total. The French forces suffered 158 casualties.

A flag of truce arrived by boat from a southern fort, but the envoy was not permitted to negotiate, so the Anglo-French force advanced, two fresh regiments, The Buffs and the 8th Punjab Infantry, being brought up to attack the second northern fort in heavy rain. Little resistance was offered and it was quickly captured. The two southern forts were untenable and capitulated.

Southern Chinese coolies served with the French and British forces (as the Canton Coolie Corps) against the Qing:

The Chinese coolies entertained in 1857 from the inhabitants of South China, renegades though they were, served the British faithfully and cheerfully before Canton, and throughout the operations in North China in 1860 they likewise proved invaluable. Their coolness under fire was admirable. At the assault of the Peiho Forts in 1860 they carried the French ladders to the ditch, and, standing in the water up to their necks, supported them with their hands to enable the storming party to cross. It was not usual to take them into action; they, however, bore the dangers of a distant fire with the greatest composure, evincing a strong desire to close with their compatriots, and engage them in mortal combat with ther bamboos.—(Fisher.)

== Aftermath ==
Seven awards of the Victoria Cross were made for Gallantry on 21 August to soldiers of the 44th Regiment of Foot and the 67th Regiment of Foot (see List of Victoria Cross recipients by campaign).

The battle was one of the last major engagements of the Second Opium War. The river route to Peking was now open, the Chinese authorities capitulated all 22 forts along the river as far as Tianjin, including that town. The army would march to the Battle of Palikao. The fighting ended with the allied occupation of Peking on 13 October 1860 and the Chinese acceptance of the trading treaties.
