= Charles Codrington Forsyth =

British captain and explorer (c. 1810 – 1873)

Captain Charles Codrington Forsyth CB
- Born: c. 1810
- Died: 12 May 1873 Ladbroke Estate, London
- Buried: Kensal Green Cemetery, London 51.527490°N 0.223050°W
- Allegiance: British Empire
- Branch: Royal Navy
- Service years: 1826–1870
- Rank: Captain (Royal Navy)
- Commands: Prince Albert; HMS Hornet; HMS Valorous; HMS Dauntless
- Known for: Prince Albert expedition
- Conflicts: Crimean War; Second Opium War (Battle of the Bogue (1856), Battle of Escape Creek, Battle of Fatshan Creek)
- Awards: Companion of the Order of the Bath

Charles Codrington Forsyth (c. 1810 – 12 May 1873) was a British captain of the Royal Navy. He participated in the second voyage of HMS Beagle, making surveys in Australia and South America. He later commanded an 1850 search for Sir John Franklin's lost expedition, being the first to bring news on the expedition's whereabouts since its disappearance in 1845. Forsyth later commanded HMS Hornet in both the Crimean War and the Second Opium War.

== Early career and HMS Beagle ==
Charles Codrington Forsyth entered the Royal Navy on 18 December 1826, initially participating in anti-slavery operations off Africa.

In 1832, he transferred to the HMS Beagle as a midshipman. There, he participated in HMS Beagle's second voyage alongside Charles Darwin, surveying 1700 miles of South American coastline between Chile and northern Peru.

In 1836, he transferred to HMS Pelorus as a master's mate. In this role, he helped evacuate British residents of Rangoon during tensions with King Tharrawaddy and surveyed Torbay, Western Australia. It was in this time he met Sir John Franklin, then governor of Van Diemen's Land, who sought his assistance capturing a group of escaped convicts.

Forsyth rejoined HMS Beagle in 1839, stopping again in Van Diemen's Land to survey Bass Strait. To support this work, Sir John Franklin lent him a cutter to command and later recommended him to the Admiralty. Among his shipmates aboard the Beagle was Graham Gore, who would later be lost in the Franklin expedition.

Forsyth was promoted to lieutenant in 1843 and transferred to HMS Helena. There, he returned to anti-slavery duties, earning further recommendations to the Admiralty for accomplishing hazardous military resupplies near the Cape of Good Hope. He was promoted to commander in 1849.

== Prince Albert expedition ==
In 1850, Forsyth volunteered to command the first of Lady Franklin's privately-funded searches for Sir John's lost expedition. After gaining permission from the Admiralty on 27 April 1850, Forsyth took command of the Prince Albert, a schooner purchased by Lady Franklin. He would be accompanied by William Parker Snow. To prepare for the hazards of an Arctic search expedition, Forsyth consulted with veteran polar explorers such as William Edward Parry, James Clark Ross, and Frederick William Beechey.

Forsyth's expedition left Aberdeen on 5 June 1850, with instructions to go through Prince Regent Inlet and search the west coast of Boothia Peninsula. Although the Prince Albert successfully entered Prince Regent Inlet, Forsyth and his crew of whalers were soon blocked by the ice. Seeing no opportunity to penetrate further, they turned back at Fury Beach on Somerset Island on 22 August 1850.

On their return journey, the Prince Albert expedition rendezvoused with HMS Assistance and HMS Intrepid near Beechey Island, who informed them that Franklin's expedition had made winter quarters nearby. Snow went ashore to investigate and found scattered traces of their camp, including tent rings and naval rope. The expedition reported this information on its return to Britain, making it the first to bring any news about the Franklin expedition since 1845. Of the reaction, historian Ian Stone writes:

The reception accorded Forsyth was all that he could have desired, although the Franklin ménage was furious at his early return. [...] Forsyth commented that he had received letters that showed the return had "given fresh hopes to many an aching heart." There was also much favourable comment in the press.

In 1851, Snow published an account of Forsyth's expedition to raise funds and support for another search party. Forsyth wrote an account of the expedition, but it was never published. He was awarded a silver medal by the British government.

== Later career and death ==
Forsyth did not participate in any further searches for the Franklin expedition. He later became inspecting-commander of the Coast Guard at Berwick-upon-Tweed and Brighton, before gaining command of HMS Hornet. In that capacity, he participated in actions against the Russian Navy off the coast of Siberia during the Crimean War, including skirmishes with the Russian frigate Aurora off Castries Bay. In 1855, he rediscovered the Liancourt Rocks, which afterwards appeared as the Hornet Rocks on some British charts. The next year, he discovered Olga Bay, which he named Port Michael Seymour.

In 1856, Forsyth commanded HMS Hornet in the Second Opium War against China. Under his command, HMS Hornet and its crew fought in the Battle of the Bogue, Battle of Escape Creek, and the Battle of Fatshan Creek, inflicting heavy losses against Chinese junks and fortifications in the Pearl River delta. Forsyth's performance in the war saw him promoted captain on 10 August 1857, after which he received a peacetime command of HMS Valorous.

Forsyth's command of Valorous led to intermittent brushes with commerce raiders of the American Civil War. Between 1863 and 1866, he was tasked with monitoring and deterring the USS Vanderbilt and CSS Alabama from targeting enemy merchant vessels in British waters off Cape Colony. In 1866, Forsyth claimed British possession of the Penguin Islands and Angra Pequina off Namibia.

In 1867, he returned to Coast Guard duty as captain of HMS Dauntless on the Humber. He retired in April 1870 and was made a Companion of the Order of the Bath the following year. Forsyth died in Ladbroke Estate, London on 12 May 1873 and is buried in Kensal Green Cemetery.

== Legacy ==
Several geographical features are named after Forsyth, including Forsyth Bay and Forsyth Point on Prince of Wales Island, as well as Forsyth Range and Forsyth Islands in Queensland, Australia.
