= List of shipwrecks in June 1857 =

The list of shipwrecks in June 1857 includes ships sunk, wrecked or otherwise lost during June 1857.

== 1 June ==
List of shipwrecks: 1 June 1857
Ship	State	Description
HMS Bustard	Royal Navy	Second Opium War, Battle of Fatshan Creek: The Albacore-class gunboat ran aground in Fatshan Creek. She was later refloated.
Canadian	United Kingdom	The steamship ran aground in the Saint Lawrence River 40 nautical miles (74 km) downstream of Quebec City, Province of Canada, British North America. She was on a voyage from Liverpool, Lancashire to Quebec City. She had sunk by 15 June. She was refloated on 29 June and taken in to Quebec City.
Chase	United Kingdom	The ship was holed by an anchor and sank at Bridlington, Yorkshire.
HMS Coromandel	Royal Navy	Second Opium War, Battle of Fatshan Creek: The gunboat ran aground in Fatshan Creek. She was refloated.
Dashing Wave	United States	The medium clipper ran aground in the Hooghly River. She was refloated and put back to Calcutta, India for repairs.
Florence	United Kingdom	The schooner was wrecked on Little Hope Island, Nova Scotia, British North America. She was on a voyage from Richibucto, New Brunswick, British North America to Liverpool.
John Calvin	United Kingdom	The barque sprang a leak and foundered in the Atlantic Ocean. Her seventeen crew were rescued by the brig Mary Young (United Kingdom). John Calvin was on a voyage from Greenock, Renfrewshire to Quebec City, Province of Canada, British North America.
Medina, and Sauguenay	United Kingdom (United Kingdom of Great Britain and Ireland) British North America	The barque Medina was run into by the steamship Saguenay and sank off Madam Island, Nova Scotia, British North America. Her crew were rescued. She was on a voyage from Waterford to Quebec City. Saguenay was beached at Berthier, Province of Canada. Her crew were rescued.
HMS Tribune	Royal Navy	Second Opium War, Battle of Fatshan Creek: The Tribune-class frigate ran aground in Fatshan Creek. She was later refloated.

== 2 June ==
List of shipwrecks: 2 June 1857
Ship	State	Description
Charlotte Ann	United Kingdom	The ship ran aground at "Hantoon". She was refloated and taken in to Wexford.

== 3 June ==
List of shipwrecks: 3 June 1857
Ship	State	Description
Cerro Gordo	United States	The ship ran aground at South Shields, County Durham, United Kingdom.
Favourite	United Kingdom	The ship was driven ashore at Arthurstown, County Wexford. She was on a voyage from Waterford to Kinsale, County Cork.
Surrey	United Kingdom	The barque was abandoned 130 nautical miles (240 km) off Cape Recife, Cape Colony. Her crew were rescued by the barque Emperor (United Kingdom). Surrey was on a voyage from Colombo, Ceylon to Antwerp, Belgium.

== 4 June ==
List of shipwrecks: 4 June 1857
Ship	State	Description
Alice	United Kingdom	The barque ran aground on St. Felipe Key. She was on a voyage from Jamaica to London. She was on a voyage from Jamaica to London. She was later refloated and taken in to Havana, Cuba, where she arrived on 26 June.
Martha Rogers	United Kingdom	The brig was wrecked on Cape Sable Island, Nova Scotia, British North America. Her crew were rescued. She was on a voyage from New York, United States to Pictou, Nova Scotia.
Sophia	United Kingdom	The whaler ran aground at Lerwick, Shetland Islands. She was refloated.

== 5 June ==
List of shipwrecks: 5 June 1857
Ship	State	Description
Ardbeg	United Kingdom	The full-rigged ship was driven ashore north of "Nyam", India. She was on a voyage from London to Calcutta, India.
Newport	(United Kingdom of Great Britain and Ireland) Saint Helena	The brigantine was driven ashore in Table Bay. She was consequently condemned.
Pleiades	United States	The ship was driven ashore at the "Mackrapatta Lump", India.

== 6 June ==
List of shipwrecks: 6 June 1857
Ship	State	Description
Douro	Spain	The steamship was wrecked at Cape Bagum. All on board were rescued. She was on a voyage from Marseille, Bouches-du-Rhône, France to Cádiz and Liverpool, Lancashire, United Kingdom. She was refloated assistance from the steamship Ebro (Portugal) and taken in to Barcelona, Spain.
Erin	United Kingdom	The paddle steamer was wrecked at "Caltura", on the east coast of Ceylon 40 nautical miles (74 km) north of Galle. All 71 people on board survived. She was on a voyage from Bombay, India to Point de Galle, Ceylon and China.
Lily	United Kingdom	The ship was driven ashore on Lundy Island, Devon. She was later refloated.

== 7 June ==
List of shipwrecks: 7 June 1857
Ship	State	Description
Gitana	(United Kingdom of Great Britain and Ireland) Cape Colony	The brigantine was driven ashore in Table Bay.
Helena	(United Kingdom of Great Britain and Ireland) Cape Colony	The schooner was driven ashore in Table Bay.
Isabella	(United Kingdom of Great Britain and Ireland) Cape Colony	The brig was driven ashore in Table Bay. She was consequently condemned.
Jessie McFarlane	United Kingdom	The ship was driven ashore and wrecked in Table Bay. She was on a voyage from Liverpool, Lancashire to Cape Town, Cape Colony.
Johnson	United Kingdom	The ship was driven ashore at Branscombe, Devon. She was on a voyage from Llanelly, Glamorgan to Branscombe. She was refloated on 12 Jund.
Rory Brown	United Kingdom	The barque was driven ashore in Table Bay. She was consequently condemned.

== 8 June ==
List of shipwrecks: 8 June 1857
Ship	State	Description
Shakespeare	United Kingdom	The ship was driven ashore at Point Levi, Province of Canada, British North America. She was on a voyage from Quebec City, Province of Canada to London.
Venus	United Kingdom	The ship was run ashore in the River Dovey and wrecked with the loss of three of her four crew.

== 9 June ==
List of shipwrecks: 9 June 1857
Ship	State	Description
Alma	United Kingdom	The schooner was driven ashore and wrecked at Caplin Cove, Newfoundland, British North America. Her crew were rescued. She was on a voyage from Pugwash, Nova Scotia, British North America to Liverpool, Lancashire.
Catherine Campbell	United Kingdom	The schooner was abandoned in the Irish Sea. She was towed in to Liverpool, Lancashire.
Dean of Guild	United Kingdom	The ship was driven ashore at Hjørring, Denmark. She was refloated.
James	United Kingdom	The schooner foundered in the North Sea off the Dudgeon Sand. Her crew were rescued. She was on a voyage from Caen, Calvados to Sunderland, County Durham.
Louisa Augusta	Russia	The ship was destroyed by fire at Narva.
Sarah Botsford	United Kingdom	The ship was driven ashore near "Borkala", Grand Duchy of Finland. She was on a voyage from Hartlepool, County Durham to Helsinki, Grand Duchy of Finland. Her crew were rescued. She had become a wreck by 12 June.
Traveller	United Kingdom	The whaler was driven ashore at Peterhead, Aberdeenshire. She was on a voyage from Peterhead to the Davis Straits.
Vision	United Kingdom	The ship was wrecked in the Min River. She was on a voyage from Hong Kong to Amoy and Foo Chow Foo, China.

== 10 June ==
List of shipwrecks: 10 June 1857
Ship	State	Description
Christabel	United Kingdom	The barque was driven ashore in Table Bay. Her crew were rescued.
James	United Kingdom	The schooner was abandoned in the North Sea. Her crew were rescued by the schooner Spray (United Kingdom). James was on a voyage from Caen, Calvados, France to Sunderland, County Durham.
Newton	French Navy	The paddle corvette was wrecked on the Port-au-Choix Rock, off the coast of Newfoundland, British North America.
Rapid	United Kingdom	The brig ran aground on the Potosi Mud Flat, off the coast of Surinam. She was on a voyage from London to Berbice, British Guiana.
William James	United Kingdom	The barque was driven ashore in Table Bay. Her crew were rescued.

== 11 June ==
List of shipwrecks: 11 June 1857
Ship	State	Description
Sarah Hotsford	United Kingdom	The ship was driven ashore at Helsinki, Grand Duchy of Finland.
Sobraon	United Kingdom	The ship sprang a leak and sank in the Atlantic Ocean at 18°S 28°W, about 600 nautical miles (1,100 km) southeast of Salvador, Brazil. All thirteen of her crew were rescued by Lord Elgin (United Kingdom). Sobraon was on a voyage from Caldera, Chile to Liverpool, Lancashire.

== 12 June ==
List of shipwrecks: 12 June 1857
Ship	State	Description
Marthine	Norway	The ship was driven ashore near Buctouche, New Brunswick, British North America. She was consequently condemned.
Niger	United Kingdom	The steamship was driven ashore and wrecked on Tenerife, Canary Islands.
Sea	United Kingdom	The ship foundered in the South Atlantic. Her crew were rescued by Perekop (United Kingdom). Sea was on a voyage from Akyab, Burma to Falmouth, Cornwall.

== 13 June ==
List of shipwrecks: 13 June 1857
Ship	State	Description
Ferguson, and Gartich	United Kingdom	The steamships were in collision in the Irish Sea of The Skerries, Anglesey and were severely damaged. Ferguson put in to Holyhead, Anglesey; Gartich was towed in. Both vessels were beached.

== 14 June ==
List of shipwrecks: 14 June 1857
Ship	State	Description
Ellen Rawson, and Isabella	United Kingdom	The barque Ellen Rawson was driven into the brig Isabella in Table Bay. Both vessels then drove ashore. Their crews were rescued by the Cape Town Lifeboat.
Lily	United Kingdom	The barque was driven ashore at Point Kosik, Greece. She had been refloated by 23 June.
Rochellaise	France	The schooner was driven ashore and wrecked at Mevagissey, Cornwall, United Kingdom. Her six crew were rescued. She was on a voyage from Cette, Hérault to Dunkirk, Nord.

== 15 June ==
List of shipwrecks: 15 June 1857
Ship	State	Description
Allen	United Kingdom	The barque capsized and sank at Valparaíso, Chile.
Jessie	United Kingdom	The ship ran aground on the Herd Sand, in the North Sea off the coast of County Durham. She was refloated on 17 June.
Magnet	United Kingdom	The ship ran aground at Reval, Russia. She was refloated on 20 June and resumed her voyage.

== 16 June ==
List of shipwrecks: 16 June 1857
Ship	State	Description
New Prosperous	United Kingdom	The ship was wrecked on the Ridge Sand, in the Thames Estuary. Her crew were rescued. She was on a voyage from Grays Thurrock to Maldon, Essex.
Stedenger	Bremen	The ship was abandoned in the Indian Ocean. Her crew were rescued by Tulsco (Bremen). Stedenger was on a voyage from Moulmein, Burma to Bremen.

== 17 June ==
List of shipwrecks: 17 June 1857
Ship	State	Description
Idomenio	Austrian Empire	The brig ran aground at Cardiff, Glamorgan, United Kingdom. She was on a voyage from Cardiff to Malta.
Neptunus	Norway	The brig was in collision with the steamship Genova ( Kingdom of Sardinia) and sank in the English Channel 10 nautical miles (19 km) south of Beachy Head, Sussex. She was on a voyage from Kristiansand to Bordeaux, Gironde, France.
Victor	United Kingdom	The brig was discovered derelict in the North Sea off the coast of Essex. She was taken in to Brightlingsea by the smack Tryal (United Kingdom(.

== 19 June ==
List of shipwrecks: 19 June 1857
Ship	State	Description
Fox	(United Kingdom of Great Britain and Ireland) British Cape Colony	The cutter was driven ashore and wrecked at Cape Town.
St. Clare	United Kingdom	The ship was abandoned in the Atlantic Ocean. Her crew were rescued by Grace and Jane (United Kingdom). St. Clare was on a voyage from Tralee, County Kerry to Quebec City, Province of Canada, British North America.

== 20 June ==
List of shipwrecks: 20 June 1857
Ship	State	Description
British Merchant	United Kingdom	The ship caught fire at Callao, Peru and was scuttled.
Dawn	United Kingdom	The schooner sprang a leak and foundered in the English Channel off Porthleven, Cornwall. Her crew were rescued. She was on a voyage from Swansea, Glamorgan to Havre de Grâce, Seine-Inférieure, France.
Elizabeth	United Kingdom	The ship ran aground in the Sound of Kyle. She was on a voyage from Liverpool, Lancashire to Eyemouth, Berwickshire. Subsequently refloated, repaired and returned to service.
Maranham	United Kingdom	The barque was driven ashore in Ellis Bay, Anticosti Island, Nova Scotia, British North America. She was on a voyage from Quebec City, Province of Canada, British North America to Newcastle upon Tyne, Northumberland. She was refloated on 27 July and taken in to Gaspé, Province of Canada.

== 21 June ==
List of shipwrecks: 21 June 1857
Ship	State	Description
James	United Kingdom	The schooner ran aground on the Sow and Pig Rocks, off the coast of Northumberland. She was on a voyage from South Shields, County Durham to Nairn. She was refloated and resumed her voyage.
Maria	Papal States	The ship was abandoned in the Atlantic Ocean and foundered. Her crew were rescued. she was on a voyage from Cardiff, Glamorgan, United Kingdom to Venice, Kingdom of Lombardy–Venetia.
Stamford	(United Kingdom of Great Britain and Ireland) British North America	The ship was wrecked on the Devil's Limb, Seal Island, Nova Scotia. She was on a voyage from Saint John, New Brunswick to Liverpool, Lancashire.
William M. Rogers	United Kingdom	The ship foundered in the Atlantic Ocean with the loss of twelve of her 25 crew. survivors were rescued by Zillah (United Kingdom). William M. Rogers was on a voyage from Liverpool to New York, United States.

== 22 June ==
List of shipwrecks: 22 June 1857
Ship	State	Description
Atalanta	United Kingdom	The brig was run down and sunk by the steamship Queen of the South with the loss of one of her eight crew. Survivors were rescued by Queen of the South. Atlananta was on a voyage from Southampton, Hampshire to Sunderland, County Durham.

== 23 June ==
List of shipwrecks: 23 June 1857
Ship	State	Description
Durham	United Kingdom	The steamship was driven ashore at Dover, Kent. She was on a voyage from London to Sierra Leone. She was refloated and resumed her voyage.
Maas	Netherlands	The steamship ran aground and sank at Pendeen, Cornwall, United Kingdom. Her crew were rescued. She was on a voyage from Cardiff, Glamorgan to Bristol, Gloucestershire, United Kingdom and Rotterdam, South Holland.
Pausewitz	Flag unknown	The ship ran aground at Dundalk, County Louth, United Kingdom. She was on a voyage from Dundalk to Liverpool, Lancashire, United Kingdom. She was refloated and resumed her voyage.
Steadfast	United Kingdom	The schooner ran aground on the Holm Sand, in the North Sea off the coast of Suffolk. She was refloated and put in to Great Yarmouth, Norfolk in a leaky condition.

== 24 June ==
List of shipwrecks: 24 June 1857
Ship	State	Description
Æolus	Russia	The ship was lost in Åland, Grand Duchy of Finland. She was on a voyage from Kronstadt to "Luba" and Piteå, Sweden.
Ararat	United Kingdom	The ship was sunk by ice at Arkhangelsk, Russia. Her crew were rescued.

== 25 June ==
List of shipwrecks: 25 June 1857
Ship	State	Description
Bank of England	United Kingdom	The ship ran aground 2 nautical miles (3.7 km) off Kennery, India. She was on a voyage from London to Bombay, India. She was declared a total loss.
Gardyne	United Kingdom	The barque was wrecked in Sprat Bay, Saint Thomas, Virgin Islands. She was on a voyage from Trinidad to Saint Thomas.
Montreal	(United Kingdom of Great Britain and Ireland) British North America	The paddle steamer was destroyed by fire in the Saint Lawrence River at Cap-Rouge, Quebec City, Province of Canada with the loss of 264 lives. The steamships Alliance and Napoleon (both (United Kingdom of Great Britain and Ireland) British North America) rescued more than 127 survivors.

== 26 June ==
List of shipwrecks: 26 June 1857
Ship	State	Description
Enniskillen	United Kingdom	The steamship ran aground on Rathlin Island, County Donegal. She was on a voyage from Londonderry to Liverpool, Lancashire.
Flora	United Kingdom	The ship ran aground at Morant Bay, Jamaica. She was on a voyage from the Black River, Jamaica to London. She was refloated and taken in to Kingston, Jamaica for repairs.
Margaret	United Kingdom	The schooner struck rocks and foundered off Peel's Point, Cornwall. Her crew were rescued. She was on a voyage from Neath, Glamorgan to Plymouth, Devon.
Montrose	Sweden	The ship was wrecked on the Porian Shoal, off the coast of Burma. Her crew were rescued. She was on a voyage from Bassein, Burma to Cork or Flamouth, Cornwall, United Kingdom.
Prince George	United Kingdom	The ship was wrecked on Anticosti Island, Nova Scotia, British North America. Her crew were rescued. She was on a voyage from Quebec City, Province of Canada, British North America to Alloa Clackmannanshire.

== 27 June ==
List of shipwrecks: 27 June 1857
Ship	State	Description
Cambria	United Kingdom	The sloop struck a rock at Saint-Malo, Ille-et-Vilaine, Franche and was damaged. She was taken into Saint-Malo for repairs.
Maria	United Kingdom	The schooner ran aground at "Hantoon", County Wexford. She was refloated the next day.
Walter Muncaster	United Kingdom	The full-rigged ship was wrecked near Chañaral, Chile with the loss of seven lives. Survivors were rescued by the barque Dennis Brundrit (United Kingdom) and the barque Heléne (Chile). Four crew of Dennis Brundit drowned when their boat capsized.

== 28 June ==
List of shipwrecks: 28 June 1857
Ship	State	Description
Caledonia	France	The schooner was destroyed by fire and sank at Singapore, Straits Settlements.
Gipsy	United Kingdom	The whaler was crushed by ice in Melville Bay. Her crew were rescued.
Park	United Kingdom	The brigantine collided with Minnesota (United States) and sank in the Bristol Channel with the loss of all seven people on board. She was on a voyage from Neath, Glamorgan to Hayle, Cornwall.

== 29 June ==
List of shipwrecks: 29 June 1857
Ship	State	Description
Atlas	United Kingdom	The schooner ran aground at "Hantoon", County Wexford.
Julia	United Kingdom	The ship was driven ashore and wrecked at Kurrachee, India. All on board, more than 300 people, were rescued by the transport ship Hydree (United Kingdom).
Unity	United Kingdom	The schooner ran aground on the Holm Sand, in the North Sea off the coast of Suffolk. She was on a voyage from Great Yarmouth, Norfolk to Falmouth, Cornwall. She was refloated.

== 30 June ==
List of shipwrecks: 30 June 1857
Ship	State	Description
Aurora	Netherlands	The ship was wrecked on the Schalkground, in the Baltic Sea. She was on a voyage from Liverpool, Lancashire, United Kingdom to Narva, Russia.
Betsy	United Kingdom	The ship was in collision with Lady Mary (United Kingdom) and sank in the Thames Estuary off the Girdler Lightship ( Trinity House).
Koning Willem de Tweede	Netherlands	The fregat, which had been used for passengers and cargo, was wrecked in Guichen Bay, off Robe, South Australia, with 25 crew; 16 drowned.
Vaucleuse	United States	The ship was driven ashore at Escuminac, British North America. She was on a voyage from Miramichi, New Brunswick, British North America to Bristol, Gloucestershire, United Kingdom. She had been refloated by 22 August and taken in to "Herring Gut" for repairs.
Walton Muncaster	United Kingdom	The barque foundered in the Pacific Ocean 25 nautical miles (46 km) north of Caldera, Chile with the loss of thirteen lives. Six crew of Dennis Brundrit (United Kingdom) were drowned trying to effect a rescue.

== Unknown date ==
List of shipwrecks: Unknown date in June 1857
Ship	State	Description
Asia	United Kingdom	The collier, a brig, ran aground near Cuxhaven. She was later refloated.
Bladah	France	The steamship was wrecked at the mouth of the Ebro before 23 June. All on board were rescued.
Carl Johan	Norway	The barque was driven ashore at Narva, Russia.
Cornelia	United Kingdom	The ship was destroyed by fire in the South Atlantic before 3 June. All on board survived. She was on a voyage from Rotterdam, South Holland to Batavia, Netherlands East Indies.
Ellen	United Kingdom	The ship was abandoned in the Atlantic Ocean. She was on a voyage from Liverpool, Lancashire to Newfoundland, British North America.
Ellen E. Booker	United States	The ship was wrecked on the Carysfort Reef before 20 June. She was on a voyage from Cardiff, Glamorgan, United Kingdom to New Orleans, Louisiana.
Emigrant	United Kingdom	The barque was driven ashore at Key West, Florida, United States before 30 June.
Europa	United Kingdom	The ship ran aground on Nickman's Ground, in the Baltic Sea. She was on a voyage from Newcastle upon Tyne, Northumberland to Kronstadt, Russia. She was refloated and taken in to Kronstadt, where she arrived on 10 June in a leaky condition.
Golden Star	United Kingdom	The ship sank at Nassau, Bahamas before 12 June. She was on a voyage from Liverpool to New Orleans, Louisiana, United States. She was subsequently raised, and repaired, sailing for Boston, Massachusetts, United States in mid-September.
Henry Ware	United Kingdom	The ship was wrecked 80 nautical miles (150 km) from Payta, Peru before 7 June. Her crew were rescued. She was on a voyage from Swansea, Glamorgan to Panama City, Republic of New Granada.
Jane	United Kingdom	The ship capsized in the Atlantic Ocean before 16 June.
Jeune Pauline	France	The ship sprang a leak and was beached at "Basse More".
Julietta	United Kingdom	The ship was destroyed by fire in the Bali Strait.
Mary Bayley	United Kingdom	The ship was in collision with Deux Frères (France) and sank on or before 11 June. Her crew were rescued by Deux Frères. Mary Bayley was on a voyage from Galaţi, Ottoman Empire to an English port.
Norwood	United Kingdom	The ship ran aground in the Hooghly River and was severely damaged. She was on a voyage from London to Calcutta, India. She was refloated and taken in to Calcutta, where she arrived on 6 June.
Ocean	United Kingdom	The ship was driven ashore at "Poose", India. She was on a voyage from Liverpool to Calcutta, India.
Salus	United Kingdom	The ship foundered in the North Sea off the coast of Aberdeenshire before 9 June.
Samuel Willets	United Kingdom	The ship was wrecked in the Squan Inlet, New Jersey, United States. All on board were rescued. She was on a voyage from Liverpool to New York, United States.
Spartan	United Kingdom	The ship foundered in the Atlantic Ocean before 3 June. She was on a voyage from Newport, Monmouthshire to Saint Thomas, Virgin Islands.
Valparaiso	Netherlands	The ship caught fire at Batavia, Netherlands East Indies before 18 June and was scuttled.
Wild Ranger	United States	The ship ran aground in Thombrell's Channel before 19 June. She was on a voyage from Calcutta, India to Boston, Massachusetts. She was refloated and put back to Calcutta for repairs.
Zephyrus	United Kingdom	The ship was driven ashore and wrecked at Cape Orloff, Russia before 26 June. Her crew were rescued.
