= Charles Elliot (Royal Navy officer, born 1818) =

Royal Navy Admiral of the Fleet (1818–1895)

Admiral of the Fleet Sir Charles Elliot KCB
- Born: 12 December 1818
- Died: 21 May 1895 (aged 76); Bitterne, Southampton
- Spouse: Louisa Blackett
- Relatives: Gilbert Elliot-Murray-Kynynmound, 2nd Earl of Minto (father)
- Military career
- Allegiance: United Kingdom
- Branch: Royal Navy
- Service years: 1832–1888
- Rank: Admiral of the Fleet
- Commands: HMS Hazard; HMS Spartan; HMS Sybille; HMS Cressy; HMS St Jean d'Acre; South East Coast of America Station; Nore Command; Plymouth Command
- Conflicts: Egyptian–Ottoman War; Second Opium War
- Awards: Knight Commander of the Order of the Bath

Admiral of the Fleet Sir Charles Gilbert John Brydone Elliot KCB (12 December 1818 – 21 May 1895) was a Royal Navy officer. As a junior officer he was involved in the bombardment of Acre during the Egyptian–Ottoman War.

During the Second Opium War Eliott led a unit of 300 sailors and marines that successfully breached the walls of Canton and then led another unit that destroyed 23 Chinese war-junks in the estuary South of the city. After that, he led a small squadron of British ships which pursued a fleet of 41 Chinese war-junks at the Battle of Escape Creek: his squadron chased the war-junks upriver and then, once the British ships were grounded as the river narrowed, they chased them in the ships' boats until all the war-junks had been overhauled. He also took part in the larger action, under Commodore Henry Keppel, involving around 100 war-junks at the Battle of Fatshan Creek.

Elliot went on to be Commander-in-Chief, South East Coast of America Station, then Commander-in-Chief, The Nore and finally Commander-in-Chief, Plymouth.

== Early career ==
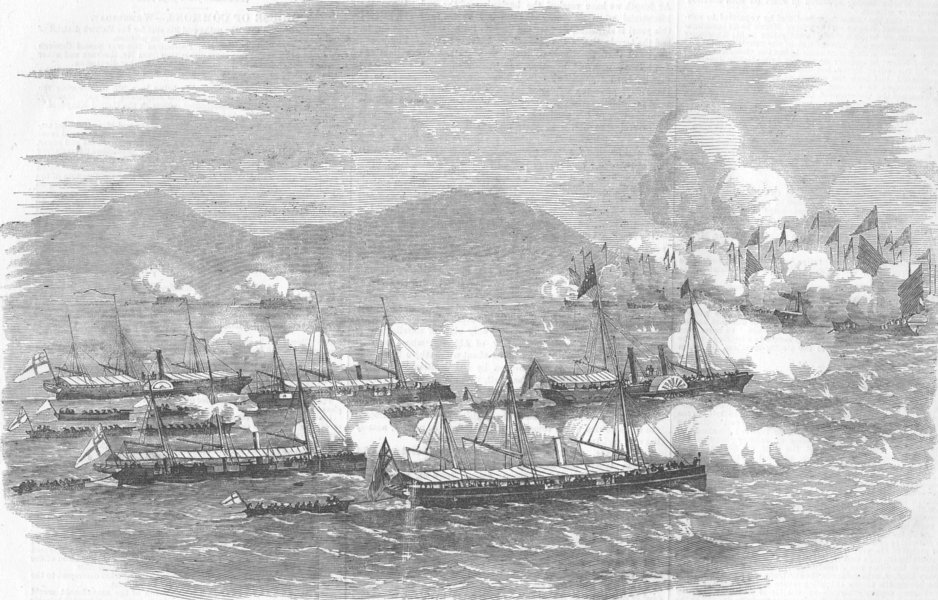
Elliot leading gunboats to attack the Chinese war-junks at the Battle of Escape Creek during the Second Opium War

Born the son of Gilbert Elliot-Murray-Kynynmound, 2nd Earl of Minto and Mary Elliot-Murray-Kynynmound (née Brydone), Elliot joined the Royal Navy in May 1832. Promoted to lieutenant on 27 June 1838, he was appointed to the second-rate HMS Rodney in August 1838. He transferred to the sixth-rate HMS Talbot in the Mediterranean Fleet in October 1838. Promoted to commander on 16 July 1840, he became commanding officer of the sloop HMS Hazard in July 1840 and was involved in the bombardment of Acre in November 1840 during the Egyptian–Ottoman War. Promoted to captain on 16 August 1841, he went on to be commanding officer of the sixth-rate HMS Spartan on the North America and West Indies Station in August 1841 and commanding officer of the fifth-rate HMS Sybille on the East Indies and China Station in May 1853.

Elliott became commodore on the East Indies and China Station, with his broad pennant in the screw gunboat HMS Haughty, in January 1855. In October 1856 a small unit of Chinese soldiers boarded the British-flagged lorcha Arrow and kidnapped twelve of the crew so initiating the Second Opium War. The British Consul, Harry Parkes, demanded return of the men, an apology and assurances of respect for the British flag. The crew was released but without any apology or assurances. In response the Commander-in-Chief on the East Indies and China Station, Rear-Admiral Sir Michael Seymour, decided to enter Canton. In late October 1856, Eliott led a unit of 300 sailors and marines which successfully breached the walls of the city and then, in early November 1856, he led another unit which destroyed 23 Chinese war-junks in the estuary South of Canton. After that, in May 1857, he led a small squadron of British ships which pursued a fleet of 41 Chinese war-junks at the Battle of Escape Creek: his squadron chased the war-junks upriver and then, once the British ships were grounded as the river narrowed, they chased them in the ships' boats until all the war-junks had been overhauled. Elliot also took part in the larger action, under Commodore Henry Keppel, involving around 100 war-junks at the Battle of Fatshan Creek in June 1857. He was appointed a Companion of the Order of the Bath on 12 September 1857.

Elliott went on to be commanding officer of the third-rate HMS Cressy in the Mediterranean Fleet in April 1859 and commanding officer of the second-rate HMS St Jean d'Acre in the Mediterranean Fleet in September 1860.

== Senior command ==
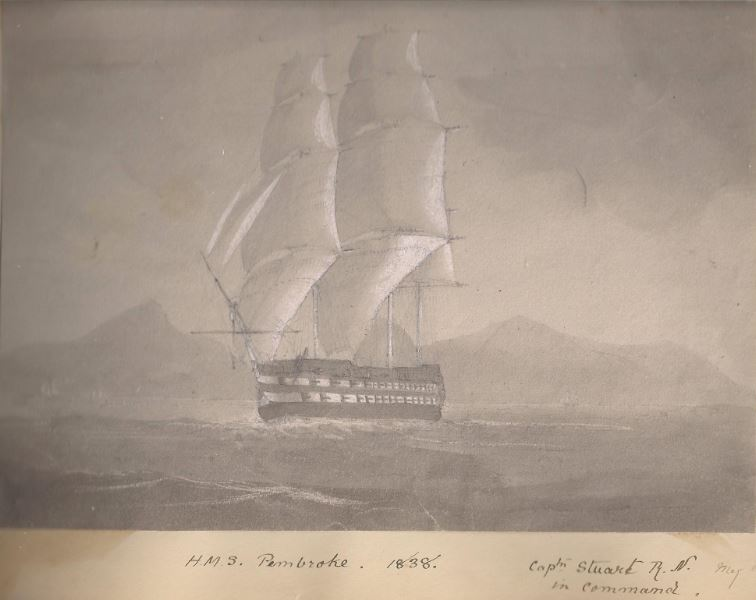
The base ship HMS Pembroke, Elliot's flagship as Commander-in-Chief, The Nore

Promoted to rear admiral on 5 August 1861, Elliot became Commander-in-Chief, South East Coast of America Station, with his broad pennant in the second-rate HMS Bombay, in April 1864. This post was based in the Falkland Islands. After HMS Bombay was destroyed by accident in a fire on the River Plate in December 1864, he transferred his flag to the frigate HMS Narcissus.

Promoted to vice admiral on 6 April 1866, Elliot went on to be Commander-in-Chief, The Nore, with his flag in the base ship HMS Pembroke, in July 1870 and, having been promoted to full admiral on 8 February 1873, he became Commander-in-Chief, Plymouth in January 1880. He was advanced to Knight Commander of the Order of the Bath on 24 May 1881, promoted to Admiral of the Fleet on 1 December 1881 and then retired in December 1888.

Elliot died at his home, Brydone House in Bitterne, Southampton, on 21 May 1895.

== Family ==
In 1863 Elliot married Louisa Blackett, daughter of Sir Edward Blackett, 6th Baronet; they had four children, three of whom died in infancy. Following the death of his first wife, he married Lady Harriet Emily Liddell, daughter of Henry Liddell, 1st Earl of Ravensworth in 1874; they had three daughters and a son.

== See also ==
- O'Byrne, William Richard (1849). "Elliot, Charles Gilbert John Brydone" . A Naval Biographical Dictionary . John Murray – via Wikisource.

== Sources ==
- Heathcote, Tony (2002). The British Admirals of the Fleet 1734 – 1995. Pen & Sword Ltd. ISBN 0-85052-835-6.

Military offices
Preceded by Richard Warren	Commander-in-Chief, South East Coast of America Station; 1864–1866	Succeeded by George Ramsay
Preceded by Richard Warren	Commander-in-Chief, The Nore; 1870–1873	Succeeded by George Hastings
Preceded by Sir Arthur Farquhar	Commander-in-Chief, Plymouth; 1880–1881	Succeeded by Sir William Stewart
