= HMS Hong Kong (1857) =

Paddle river tender

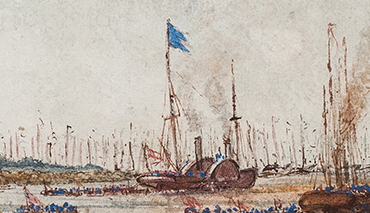
- Hong Kong in the Battle of Fatshan Creek, depicted by John Corbett

United Kingdom
- Name: Hong Kong
- Namesake: Hong Kong
- Launched: 1856
- Fate: Sold c. 1858

General characteristics
- Class & type: Paddle steamer

HMS Hong Kong was a paddle river tender launched in 1856. She was hired by the Royal Navy by 1857 and was active in Guangdong during the Second Opium War.

== History ==
The steamer was launched in 1856. By early 1857, it was acquired by the Royal Navy as a hired steamer. On February 10, the ship, led by HMS Sybille, took part in a firing against Qing ships off Second Bar Island. On April 6, the ship was involved in another skirmish in Sandy Bay, where several junks were sunk.

On May 25, Hong Kong, with Commodore Charles Elliot on board, fought in the Battle of Escape Creek. In the same month, command was transferred to Commodore Henry Keppel, who hoisted his broad pennant on the ship for future actions in the Canton River. Under his pennant, Hong Kong participated in the Battle of Fatshan Creek on June 1, from which Keppel commanded the British forces. The ship came under heavy Chinese fire, and suffered heavy damage during the battle. She was grounded twice and was hulled twelve times. She survived the battle, and was transferred out of Keppel's command on August 22, 1858. She was sold around the same year.
