= HMS Hornet (1854) =

Sloop of the Royal Navy

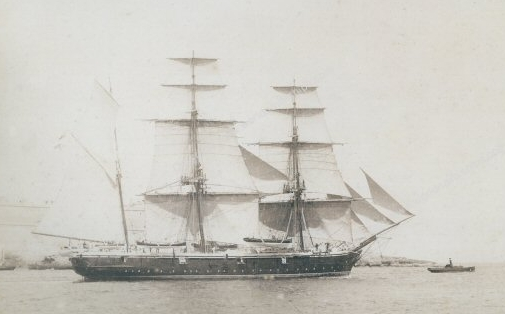
- Hornet's sister ship, Cruizer, shown at Malta in 1894.

History

United Kingdom
- Name: Hornet
- Ordered: 1 November 1850
- Builder: Royal Dockyard, Deptford
- Cost: £29,142
- Launched: 13 April 1854
- Commissioned: 14 July 1854
- Fate: Broken up 1868

General characteristics
- Class & type: Cruizer-class screw sloop
- Displacement: 1,045 tons
- Tons burthen: 747 51/94 bm
- Length: 160 ft (49 m) (gundeck); 140 ft 1.75 in (42.7165 m) (keel)
- Beam: 31 ft 10 in (9.70 m)
- Depth of hold: 17 ft 6 in (5.33 m)
- Installed power: 100 nominal horsepower; 233 ihp (174 kW)
- Propulsion: Two-cylinder horizontal single-expansion steam engine; Single screw
- Sail plan: Barque-rigged
- Speed: 7.75 knots (14.35 km/h; 8.92 mph)
- Armament: One 32 pdr (56 cwt) pivot gun; Sixteen 32 pdr (32 cwt) carriage guns

HMS Hornet was a 17-gun wooden screw sloop of the Cruizer class of the Royal Navy, launched in 1854 and broken up in 1868.

== Construction ==
Originally ordered in April 1847 as a "Screw Schooner", she was suspended in August 1847 and re-ordered on 1 November 1850 to the same design as HMS Cruizer. The wooden sloops of the Cruizer class were designed under the direction of Lord John Hay, and after his "Committee of Reference" was disbanded, their construction was supervised by the new Surveyor of the Navy, Sir Baldwin Walker. Hornet was laid down at the Royal Dockyard, Deptford in June 1851. Her two-cylinder horizontal single-expansion steam engine, which was supplied by James Watt & Company at a cost of £5,450, generated an indicated horsepower of 233 hp (174 kW); driving a single screw, this gave a maximum speed of 7.75 knots (14.35 km/h; 8.92 mph). The class was given a barque-rig sail plan.

== Armament ==
All the ships of the class were provided with one 32-pounder (56 cwt) long gun on a pivot mount and sixteen 32-pounder (32 cwt) carriage guns in a broadside arrangement.

== History ==
Hornet served in the Baltic in 1854 during the Crimean War, and from 1854 until 1859 she served in the East Indies and in China, taking part in the Second Opium War. After a refit in 1859–1860 she recommissioned for the Cape of Good Hope Station and served both there and on the East Indies Station.

=== The Russian War (1854) ===
Under Commander Frederick Archibald Campbell Hornet served in the Baltic campaign of 1854 during the Russian War.

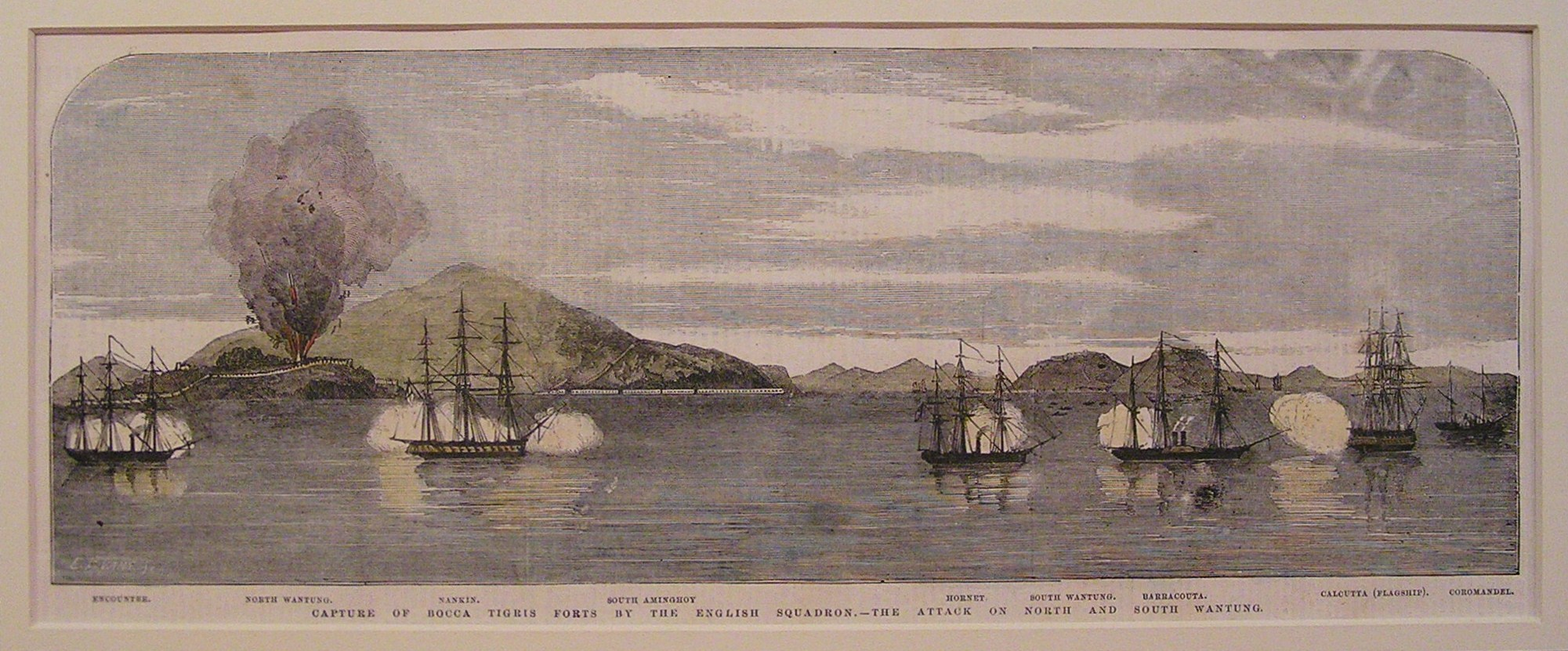
Hornet at the capture of the Bocca Tigris forts in 1856

=== The East Indies and China Stations (1854 - 1856) ===
On 25 April 1855 Hornet, along with HMS Sybille and HMS Bittern, under Commodore The Hon. Charles Elliot discovered Liancourt Rocks in the Sea of Japan, at 37°14′22″N 131°52′10″E. It was about a mile in extent, running in a NW by W and SE by E direction and formed together by a reef of rocks. The Hornet's commander at the time, Charles Codrington Forsyth, noted in the ship's log:

We could discern no dangers lying off them and the waters appear to be deep close to the shore. They are barren, without exception of a few patches of grass on their sides and landing would be difficult except in very calm weather. The height of the NW island was ascertained to be 410 ft above sea level

=== The Second Opium War (1856 - 1859) ===
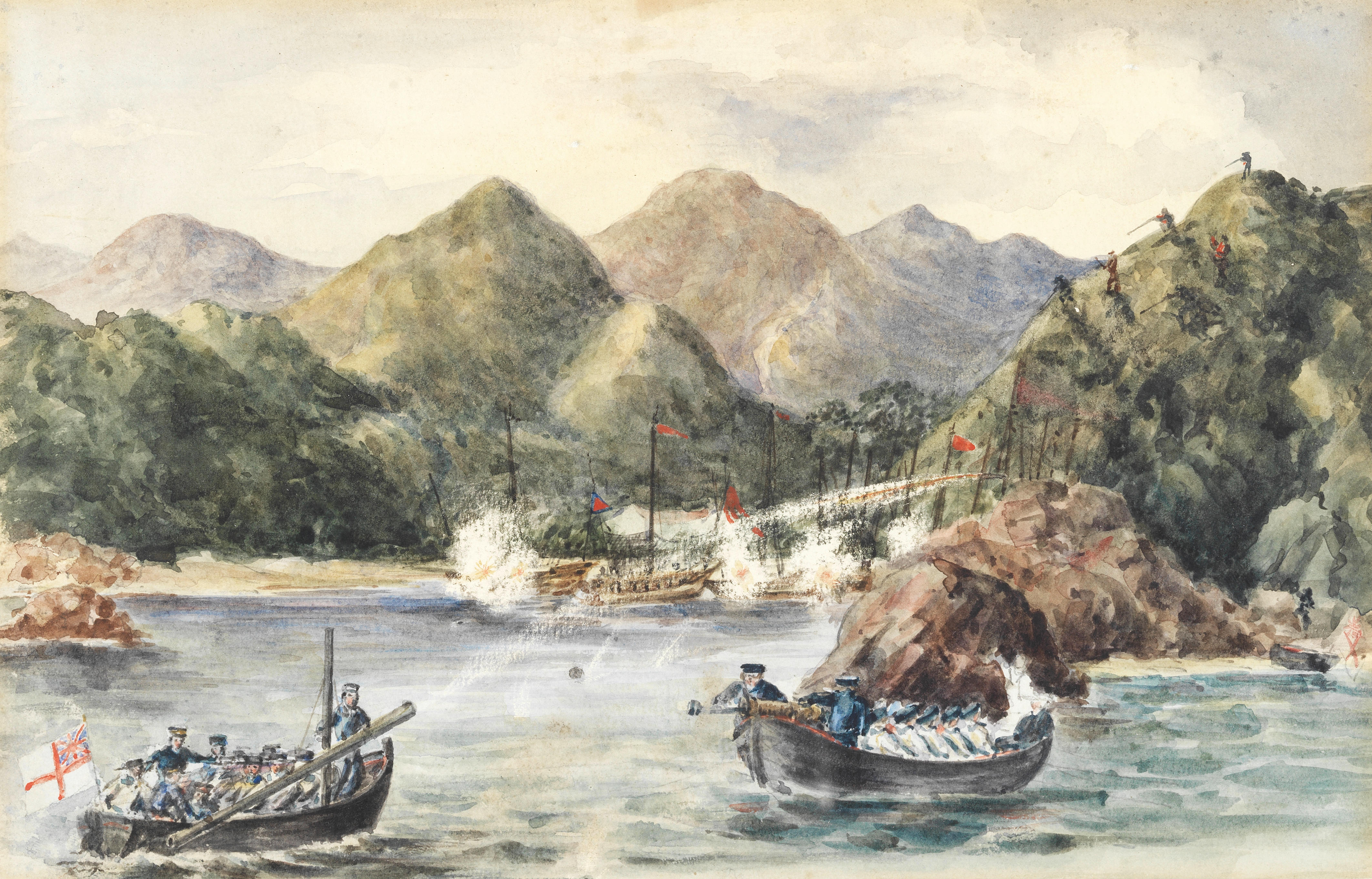
Boats of HMS Hornet attacking a Pirate fleet, 1857

On 12 November 1856, in company with Calcutta, Nankin, Encounter, Barracouta and Coromandel, she bombarded and captured the Bogue forts and the next day, the Anunghoy forts. Christmas 1856 was spent as Guardship at Canton (now Guangzhou). In 1857 she spent much of her time at Hong Kong and in the Canton River, culminating in the capture of Canton on 28 December 1857 under Rear-Admiral Sir Michael Seymour. In February 1859 she sailed for England, decommissioning in Portsmouth on 14 July 1859.

=== The Cape of Good Hope and East Indies Stations (1860 - 1864) ===
On 20 July 1860 Hornet recommissioned for service on the Cape of Good Hope Station under Commander William Buller Fullerton Elphinstone. She also served during this period on the East Indies Station.

== Disposal ==
Hornet decommissioned at Portsmouth on 22 September 1864 and was broken up by White of Cowes in 1868.

== Commanding officers ==
From	To	Captain
15 May 1854	13 September 1854	Commander Frederick Archibald Campbell
13 September 1854	1857?	Commander Charles Codrington Forsyth
January 1857	26 February 1858	Commander William Dowell
26 February 1858	14 July 1859	Commander Lord Gilford
14 July 1859	20 July 1860	Out of Commission (Portsmouth)
20 July 1860	3 May 1861	Commander William Buller Fullerton Elphinstone
3 May 1861	1864?	Commander Joseph Dayman
1864?	12 September 1864	Acting Commander Richard Hare
12 September 1864		Out of Commission (Portsmouth)
