= HMS Coromandel (1855) =

Sloop of the Royal Navy

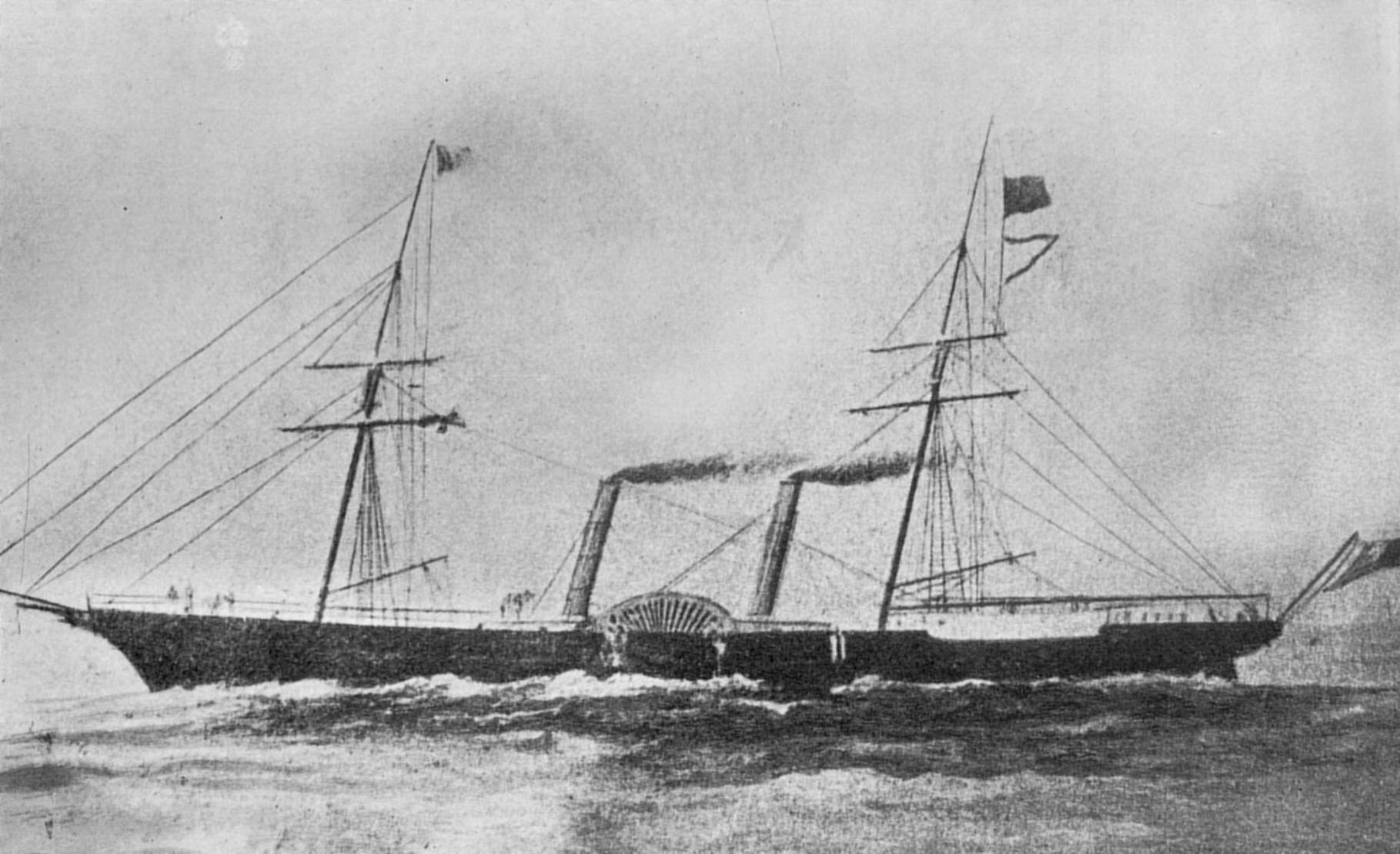
- HMS Coromandel in 1860

History

United Kingdom
- Name: Tartar
- Namesake: Tatars
- Operator: Peninsular & Oriental Steam Navigation Company
- Builder: Thomas & Robert White, Cowes, Isle of Wight
- Cost: £17,567
- Launched: 7 July 1853
- Fate: Sold to the Royal Navy 28 August 1855

United Kingdom
- Name: HMS Coromandel
- Namesake: Coromandel Coast
- Acquired: 8 January 1855
- Fate: Sold 17 August 1866 in Hong Kong

General characteristics
- Tonnage: 171nrt
- Tons burthen: 303 (bm)
- Length: 172.8 ft (52.7 m)
- Beam: 22.6 ft (6.9 m)
- Depth: 11.6 ft (3.5 m)
- Propulsion: Sail & paddles driven by a trunk geared steam engine. Her engine was made by Maudsley, Sons & Field, and generated 150nhp and 550, or 557ihp
- Speed: 12 knots

HMS Coromandel was a wooden paddle dispatch vessel of the Royal Navy. She was built for the P&O company as the passenger and cargo steamer Tartar. The Navy purchased her in 1855 and she participated in several battles in Chinese waters, including having been sunk and recovered. The Navy sold her in 1866 and she went through several changes in ownership before she was broken up in 1876.

== P&O company ==
Tartar had a shallow-draught wooden hull, strengthened by diagonal planking and reinforced with iron scantlings.

On 8 September 1853 she sailed from Southampton for the Far East where she was to provide a feeder service for the P&O Line on the China coast. Cadiz towed Tartar for the first four days, but then Tartar completed the rest of voyage to Singapore mostly under sail.

On 4 June 1854 Tartar sailed to the Paracel Islands to assist Douro, which had run aground there on 26 May. Salvage efforts were abandoned on 10 June.

== Royal Navy ==
Lieutenant Sholto Douglas commissioned Coromandel in October 1856 for operations on the Canton river. She served in the Arrow War (1856–1860) in China, firing the first shot of the war on 23 October 1856 during the capture of Canton.

On 1 June 1857 she was at the Battle of Fatshan Creek, during which she ran aground. There she served as the flagship for Rear-Admiral Michael Seymour. From 2 July she served as a tender to HMS Chesapeake. On 22 September she was under the command of Master William H. Vine.

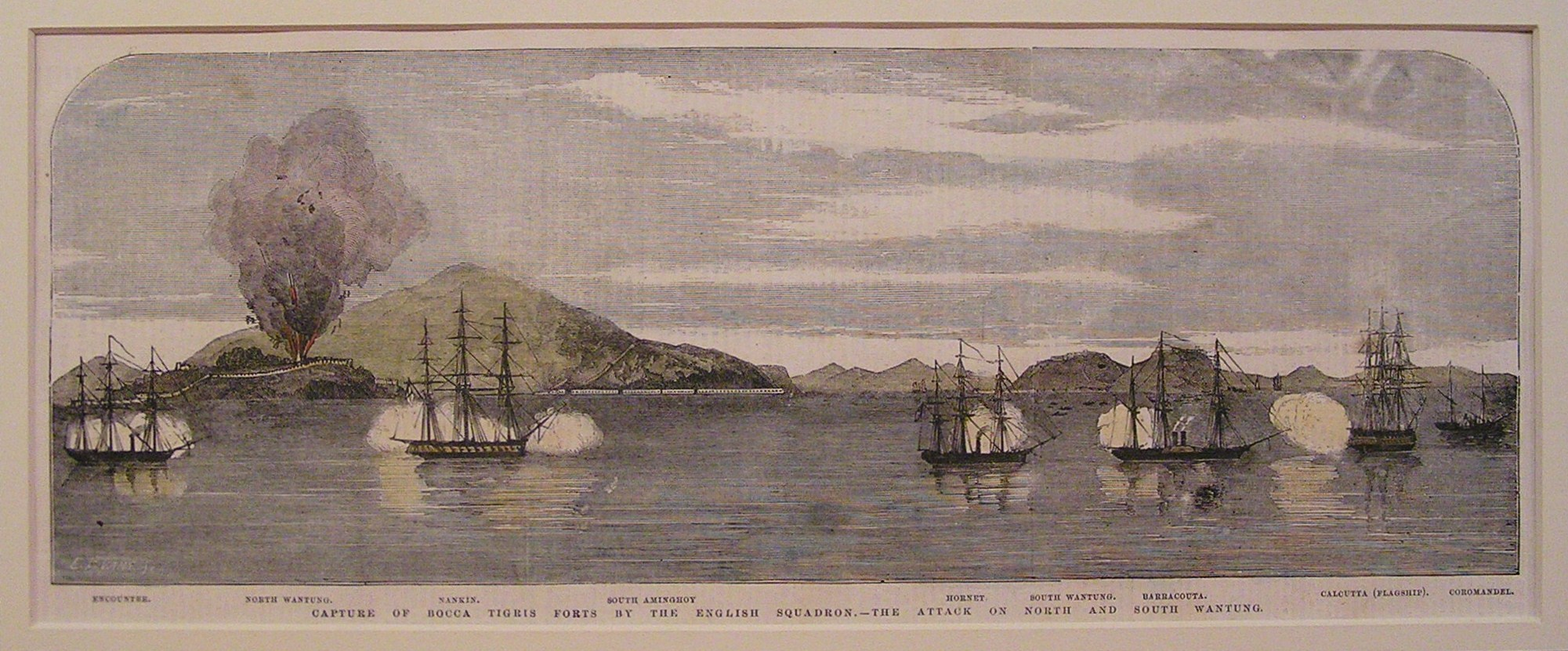
Coromandel at the capture of the Bocca Tigris forts in 1856

Coromandel was at all three of the battles of the Pei-ho or Taku Forts: First (1858), Second (1859), and Third Battle of the Taku Forts (1860). In the second, in 1859, she was sunk but was later raised, repaired, and returned to service. On 23 August 1859 she was the flagship of Vice-Admiral James Hope.

On 25 October 1861 Coromandel was under the command of Lieutenant Duncan George Davidson and serving as tender to HMS Imperieuse. From 29 October 1862 she was under the command of lieutenant Robert Peel Denniston and serving as a tender to HMS Euryalus. From 17 August 1863 she was under the command of Lieutenant George Poole. Euryalus participated in both the bombardment of Kagoshima on 16 August 1863 and the bombardment of Shimonoseki in September 1864; it is not clear whether Coromandel was in company.

== Later career ==
The Navy sold Coromandel in 1866 to R. Byrne & Company, Hong Kong. In 1867 she was sold to Kishu, Japan, where her new owners renamed her Naruto.

Glover & Co., of Hong Kong, purchased her in 1868, and converted her to screw propulsion. The company went bankrupt and she was sold to Wright & Co., of Nagasaki, who sold her to Iwatani Shozo, who sold her to Hunt & Co., managers in Japan for the Netherlands Trading Society. She then underwent extensive repairs.

== Fate ==
In 1876 Hunt & Co. sold the vessel to shipbreakers. She had been laid up at Yokohama for some time during which her hull had suffered from white ants.
