= Admiral Warren =

Admiral Warren may refer to:

- Frederick Warren (1775–1848), British Royal Navy vice admiral
- John Borlase Warren (1753–1822), British Royal Navy admiral
- Peter Warren (Royal Navy officer) (1703–1752), British Royal Navy vice admiral
- Richard Warren (Royal Navy officer) (1806–1875), British Royal Navy admiral
- Samuel Warren (Royal Navy officer) (1769–1839), British Royal Navy rear admiral
