= Battle of Fatshan Creek =

Naval battle

- Part of the Second Opium War
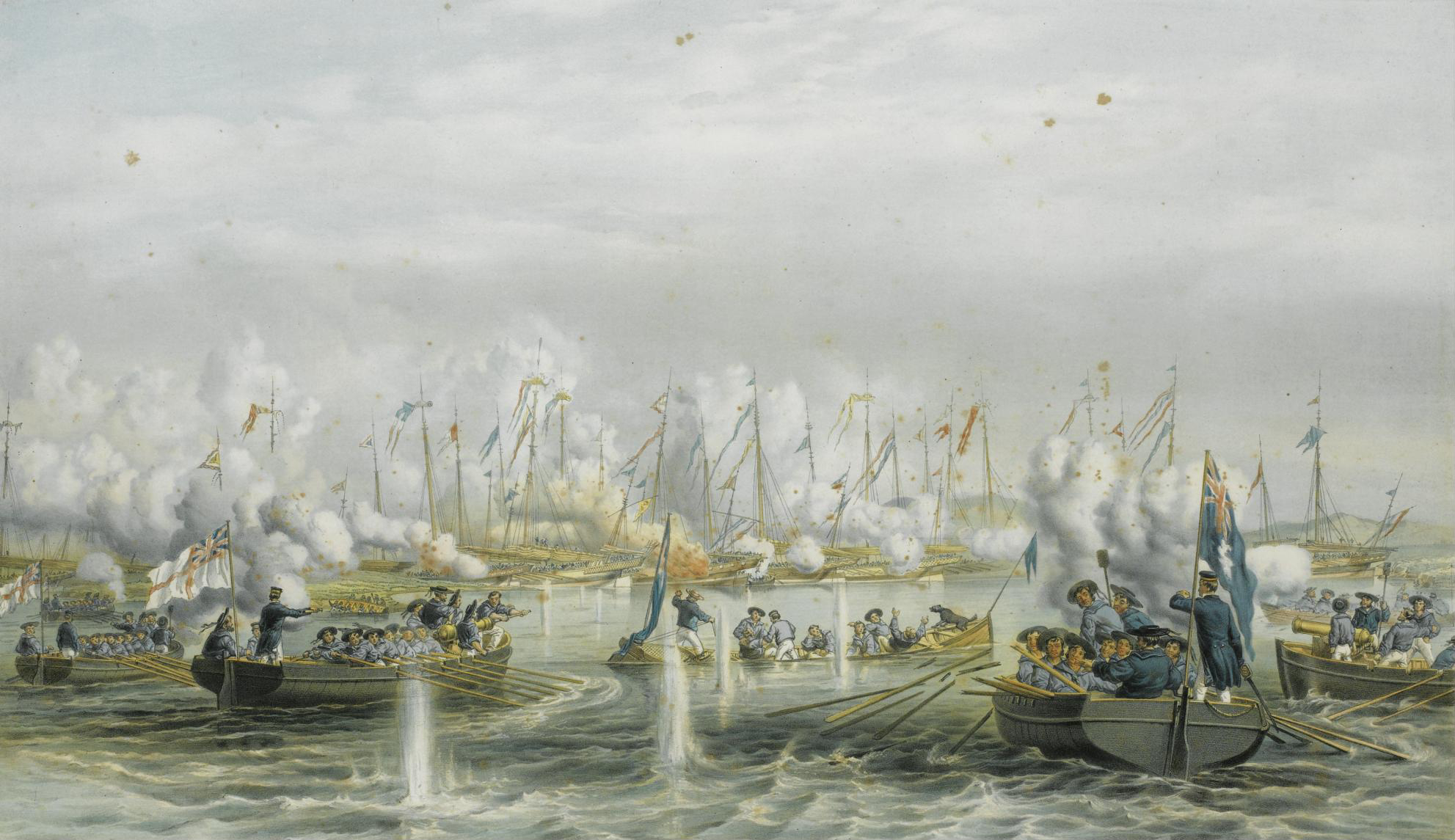
- Advance of British boats during the naval battle at Fatshan Creek, by Oswald Walters Brierly
Date	1 June 1857
Location	Foshan, Guangdong, China 23.029°N 113.119°E
Result	British victory

Belligerents
United Kingdom	Qing China

Commanders and leaders
(United Kingdom) Sir Michael Seymour	Unknown

Strength
1,900+ marines & sailors 1 screw sloop 1 paddle steamer 7 gunboats	1 fort 25 guns 100 war-junks

Casualties and losses
13 killed (3 officers); 44 wounded (4 officers); 1 launch destroyed 1 gunboat damaged	1 fort captured 25 guns captured 2 war-junks destroyed 70–80 war-junks captured

The Battle of Fatshan Creek (佛山水道之戰) was a naval engagement fought between the United Kingdom's Royal Navy and the Cantonese fleet of Qing China on 1 June 1857. Rear-Admiral Sir Michael Seymour sought out and destroyed the Chinese fleet before advancing to the city of Canton (modern-day Foshan) for its capture.

== British order of battle ==
Ship	Commander	Ref.
Coromandel	Rear-Admiral Sir Michael Seymour; Lieutenant Sholto Douglas	
Hong Kong	Commodore Henry Keppel; Lieutenant James Graham Goodenough	
Haughty	Commodore Charles Elliot; Lieutenant Richard Vesey Hamilton	
Plover	Lieutenant Keith Stewart	
Opossum	Lieutenant Colin Andrew Campbell	
Bustard	Lieutenant Tathwell Collinson	
Forester	Lieutenant Arthur Innes	
Starling	Lieutenant Arthur Villiers	
Staunch	Lieutenant Leveson Wildman	
Boats from Calcutta, Nankin, Raleigh, Tribune, Highflyer, Inflexible, Niger, Sybille, Hornet, Fury, Elk, Acorn, and Cruizer

== Gallery ==
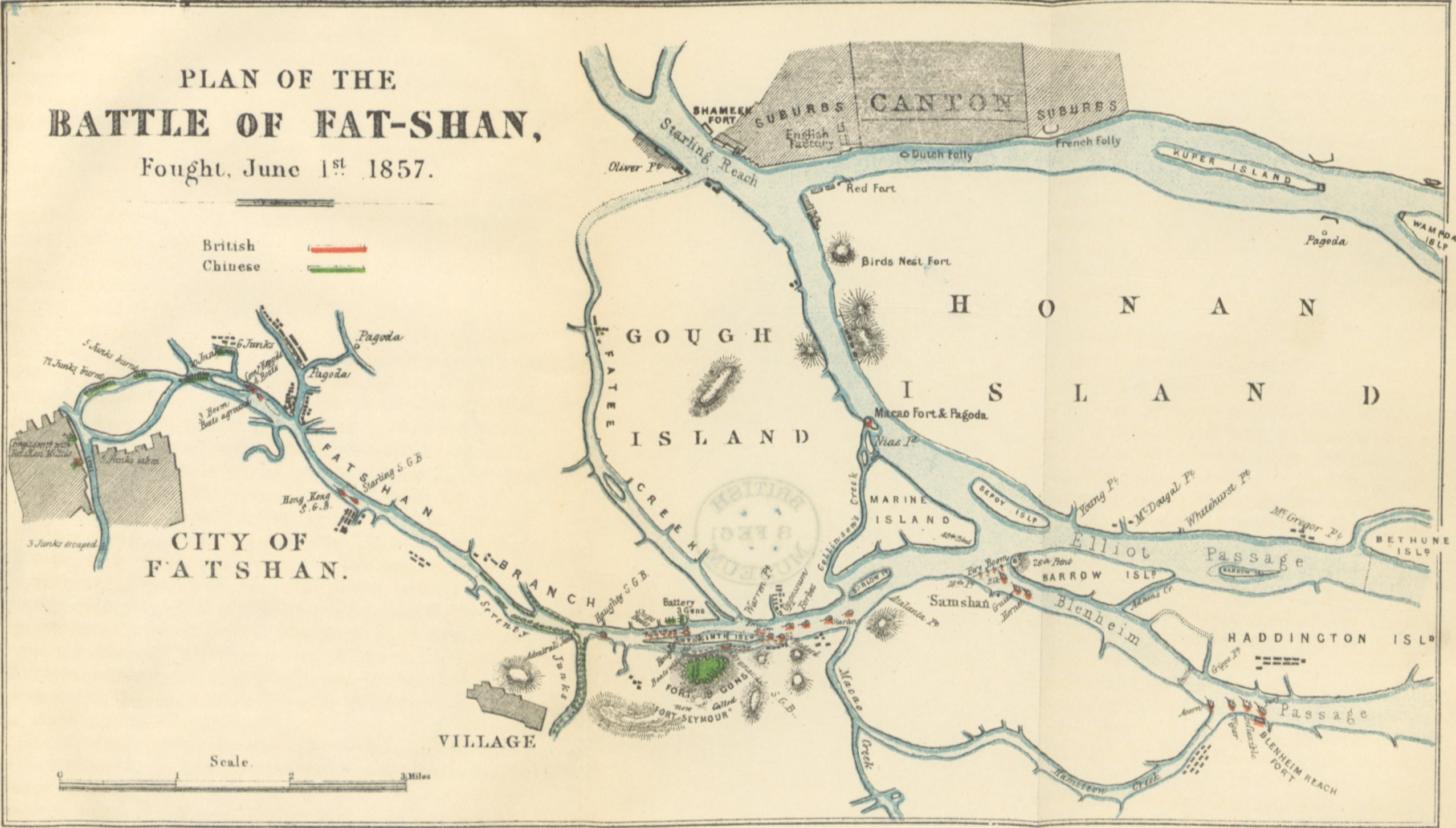
Plan of the battle

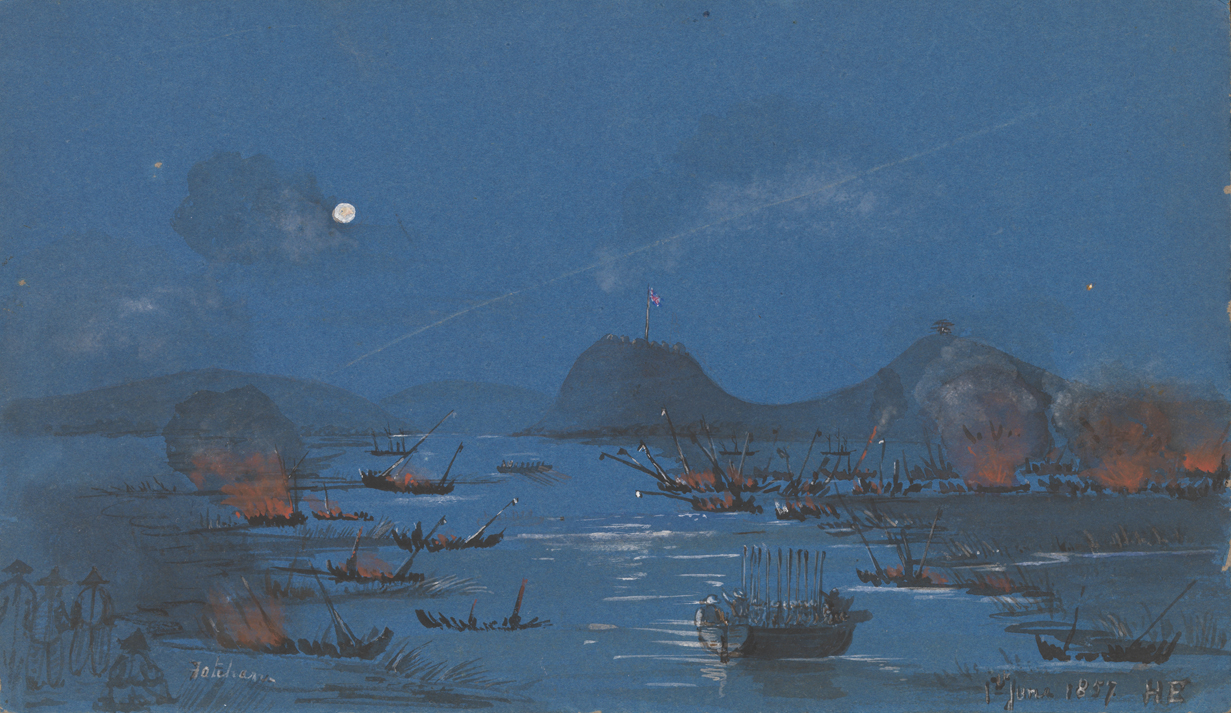
Naval action, Fatshan Creek

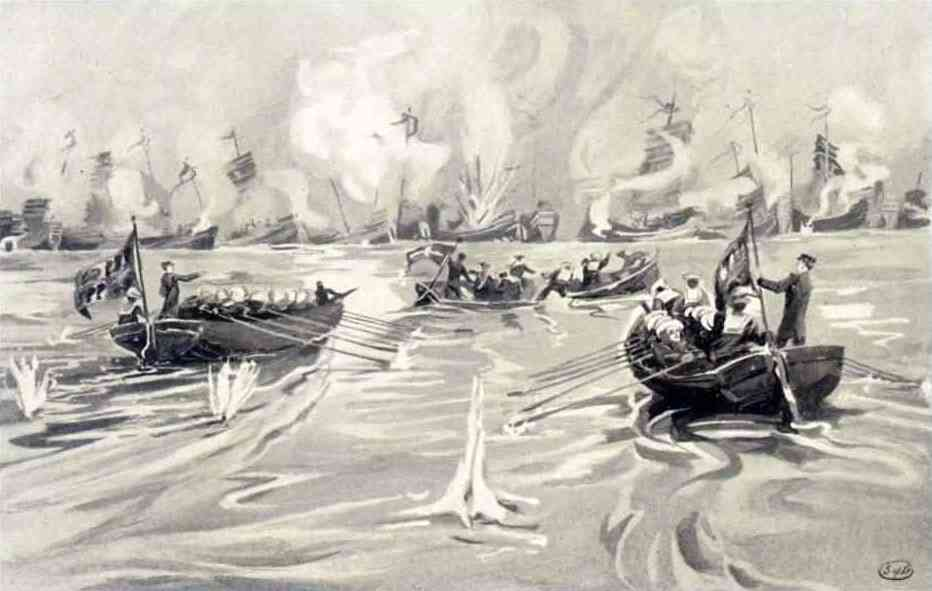
British rowboats

== See also ==
- Battle of Escape Creek

== Sources ==
- Carter, Thomas; Long, W. (2010). Medals of the British Army: And How They Were Won. Lancer International Incorporated. ISBN 9781935501275.
- Clowes, William Laird (1966) [1903]. The Royal Navy, a History from the Earliest Times to the Death of Queen Victoria. Vol. 7. New York: AMS Press.
- Jaques, Tony (2007). Dictionary of Battles and Sieges: F-O. Greenwood Press. ISBN 9780313335389.
- Jameson, William (2004). The Fleet that Jack Built: Nine Men who Made a Navy. Periscope Publishing. ISBN 9781904381280.
