= Henry Keppel =

Royal Navy Admiral of the Fleet (1809–1904)

Admiral of the Fleet The Honourable Sir Henry Keppel GCB OM
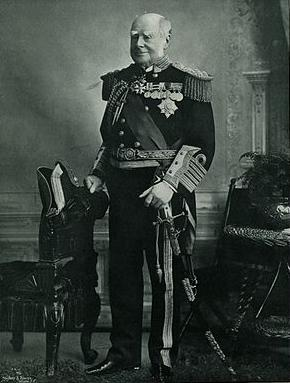
- Admiral of the Fleet Sir Henry Keppel
- Born: 14 June 1809; Kensington, London, England
- Died: 17 January 1904 (aged 94); Piccadilly, London, England
- Burial place: St Mary the Virgin, Winkfield
- Spouse(s): Katherine Louisa Crosbie (div); Jane Elizabeth West
- Military career
- Allegiance: United Kingdom
- Branch: Royal Navy
- Service years: 1822–1879
- Rank: Admiral of the Fleet
- Commands: HMS Childers; HMS Maeander; HMS St Jean d'Acre; HMS Rodney; HMS Colossus; Cape of Good Hope Station; South East Coast of America Station; China Station; Plymouth Command
- Conflicts: First Carlist War; First Opium War; Anglo-Bruneian War; Crimean War; Second Opium War
- Awards: Knight Grand Cross of the Order of the Bath; Member of the Order of Merit; Legion of Honour (France); Order of the Medjidie, 2nd Class (Ottoman Empire)

Admiral of the Fleet Sir Henry Keppel, GCB, OM (14 June 1809 – 17 January 1904) was a Royal Navy officer. His first command was largely spent off the coast of Spain, which was then in the midst of the First Carlist War. As commanding officer of the corvette HMS Dido on the East Indies and China Station he was deployed in operations during the First Opium War and in operations against Borneo pirates. He later served as commander of the naval brigade besieging Sebastopol during the Crimean War. After becoming second-in-command of the East Indies and China Station, he commanded the British squadron in the action with Chinese pirates at the Battle of Fatshan Creek when he sank around 100 enemy war-junks. He subsequently took part in the capture of Canton during the Second Opium War.

Keppel went on to be Commander-in-Chief, Cape of Good Hope and West Coast of Africa Station, then Commander-in-Chief, South East Coast of America Station, Commander-in-Chief, China Station and finally Commander-in-Chief, Plymouth.

== Early career ==
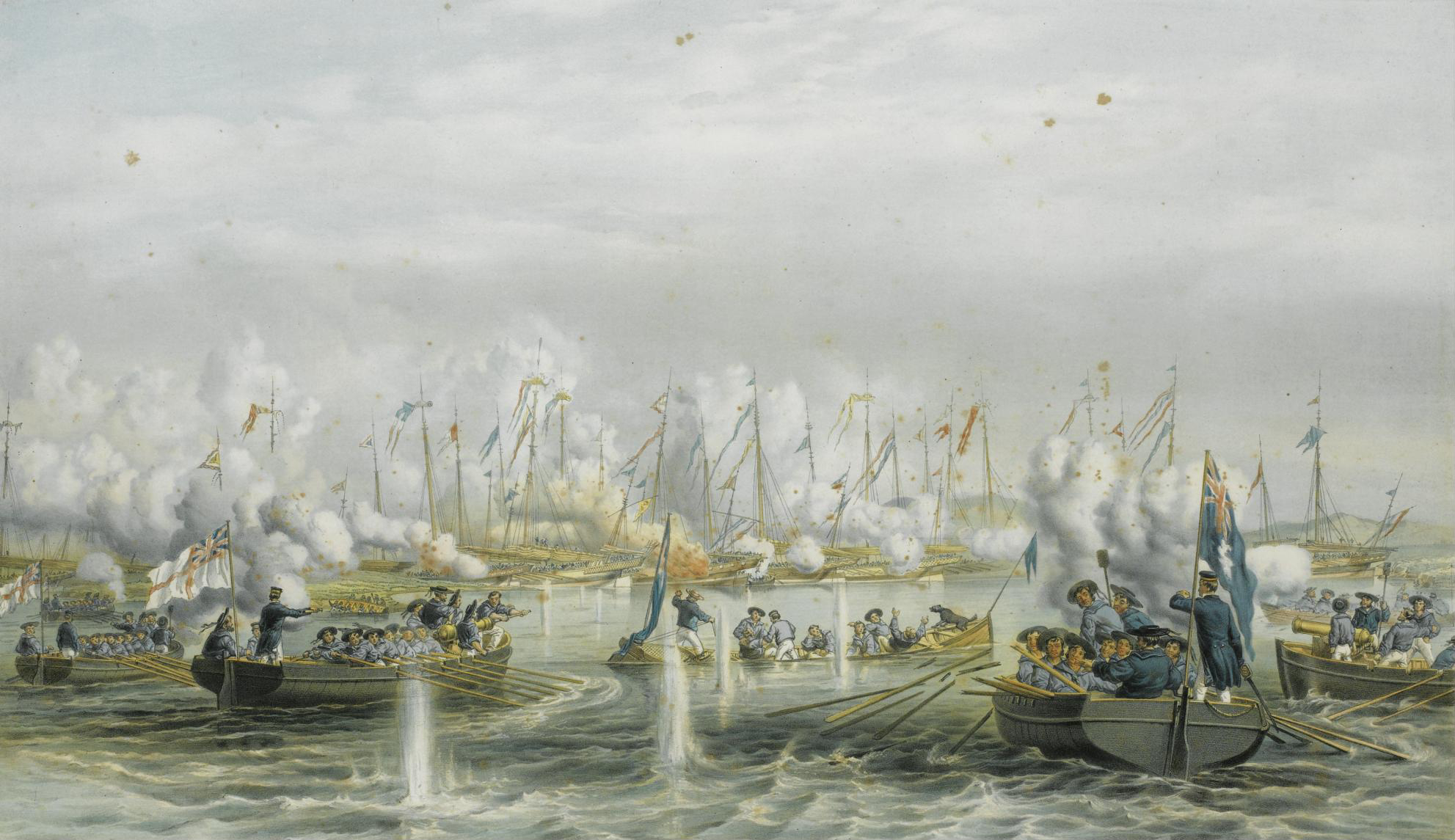
The advance of the British boats under Keppel's command during the Battle of Fatshan Creek by Oswald Walters Brierly

Keppel was born to William Keppel, 4th Earl of Albemarle, and Elizabeth Southwell Keppel, daughter of Edward Southwell, 20th Baron de Clifford. He joined the Royal Naval Academy at Portsmouth as a cadet in February 1822, and was appointed a midshipman in the sixth-rate HMS Tweed on the Cape of Good Hope Station. Promoted to lieutenant on 28 January 1829, he transferred to the fifth-rate HMS Galatea on the North America and West Indies Station in February 1830 and to the fifth-rate HMS Magicienne on the East Indies and China Station in July 1831.

Promoted to commander on 30 January 1833, Keppel became commanding officer of the brig HMS Childers in May 1834. His first command was largely spent off the coast of Spain, which was then in the midst of the First Carlist War. He was deployed in operations in support of the liberal forces of Maria Christina, the Regent of Spain at the time of the minority of Isabella II, who had faced a revolt by Carlos, Count of Molina. He was then engaged with the West Africa Squadron in operations to suppress the slave trade.

Promoted to captain on 5 December 1837, Keppel became commanding officer of the corvette HMS Dido on the East Indies and China Station and was deployed in operations during the First Opium War and in operations against Borneo pirates. He went on to become commanding officer of the fifth-rate HMS Maeander in November 1847 and was again deployed in operations against Iban rebels and the Sultanate of Brunei in the Anglo-Bruneian War.

In 1849, the English schoolmaster James Summers was arrested and imprisoned while on an excursion to Portuguese Macau for failing to doff his hat for a festival procession celebrating the Feast of Corpus Christi. Keppel, then the captain of HMS Maeander, requested the Portuguese authorities in Macau to release Summers, which was rejected. An incensed Keppel formed a rescue party from the crew of Maeander and attacked the gaol where Summers was held, freeing him. However, the raid led to an international incident between Britain and Portugal as four Portuguese soldiers and the daughter of a gaoler were killed or injured. Maria II of Portugal was deeply angered after hearing of the raid, and tensions only cooled after the British government apologised and paid reparations.

Keppel became commanding officer of the steam line-of-battle ship HMS St Jean d'Acre in May 1853. When the Crimean War broke out on 1854, HMS St Jean d'Acre formed part of the Baltic Fleet and the ship was deployed to the Black Sea. Keppel swapped commands with the captain of the sailing line-of-battle ship HMS Rodney, whose crew were all ashore, in July 1855 and served as commander of the naval brigade besieging Sevastopol in August and September 1855. He transferred to the command of the second-rate HMS Colossus in the Baltic Fleet in January 1856 and then assisted with the re-embarkation of the British troops in the Crimea. For his part in the Crimean War Keppel was appointed a Companion of the Order of the Bath on 5 February 1856, appointed a member of the French Legion of Honour on 2 August 1856 and awarded the Turkish Order of the Medjidie, 2nd class, on 3 April 1858.

Promoted to commodore, Keppel became second-in-command of the East Indies and China Station, with his broad pennant in the frigate HMS Raleigh, in September 1856. HMS Raleigh was lost on an uncharted rock near Hong Kong, and, although Keppel was subsequently court-martialed, he was honourably acquitted for the loss of the ship. He then transferred his pennant to the sixth-rate HMS Alligator. After commandeering the chartered steamer Hong Kong, he commanded the British squadron, which consisted of the Hong Kong and seven gun boats, in the action with Chinese pirates at the Battle of Fatshan Creek in June 1857 when he sank around 100 enemy war-junks. For his part in this action Keppel was advanced to Knight Commander of the Order of the Bath on 12 September 1857. He also took part in the capture of Canton in December 1857 during the Second Opium War.

== Senior command ==
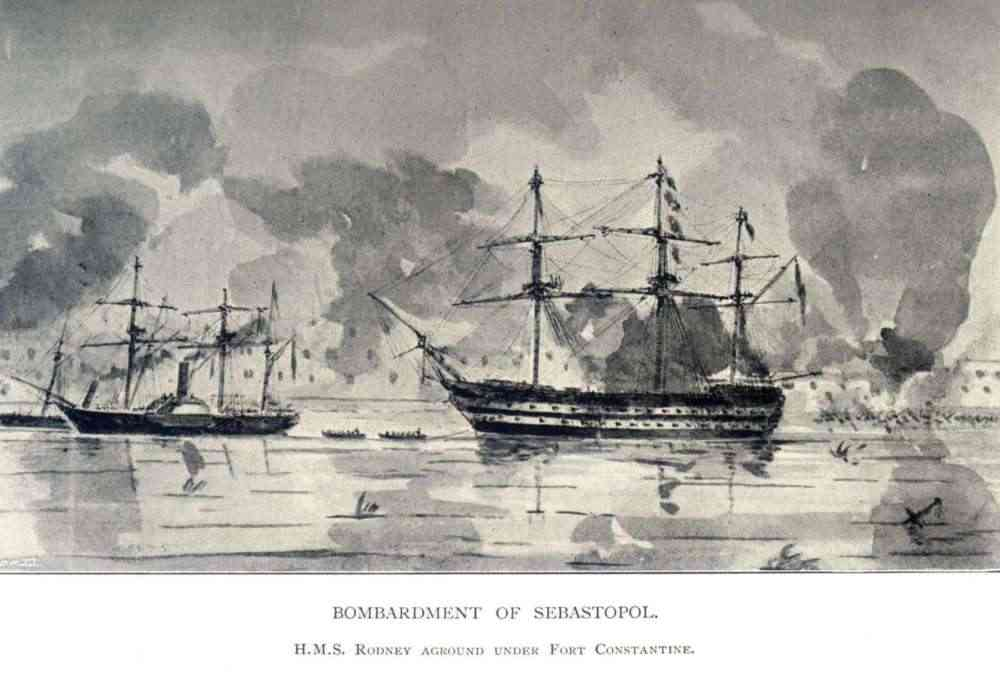
The second-rate HMS Rodney taking part, under Keppel's command, in the bombardment of Sebastopol; the ship later became Keppel's flagship on the China Station

The prevalence of peace gave Keppel no further chance of active service. Promoted to rear admiral on 22 August 1857, he was appointed a Groom in Waiting to the Queen on 24 September 1859 and became Commander-in-Chief, Cape of Good Hope and West Coast of Africa Station, with his flag in the frigate HMS Forte, in May 1860. During the sea passage out to this station he was accused of developing a relationship with Lady Grey, the wife of Sir George Grey, the Governor of Cape Colony, and was hastily transferred to become Commander-in-Chief, South East Coast of America Station instead.

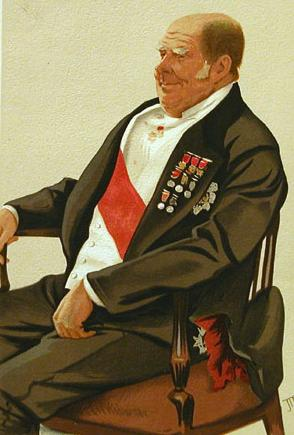
As depicted by James Tissot in Vanity Fair, 22 April 1876

Promoted to vice admiral on 11 January 1864, Keppel went on to be Commander-in-Chief, China Station, with his flag in the second-rate HMS Rodney, in January 1867. Promoted to full admiral on 12 July 1869 and advanced to Knight Grand Cross of the Order of the Bath on 20 May 1871, he took up his last command when he became Commander-in-Chief, Plymouth in November 1872.

Keppel was promoted to Admiral of the Fleet on 5 August 1877, appointed First and Principal Naval Aide-de-Camp to the Queen on 9 March 1878 and retired in June 1879. In 1883 he bought Grove Lodge, a property in Winkfield in Berkshire, and made it his home.

He was among the original recipients of the Order of Merit (OM) in the 1902 Coronation Honours list published on 26 June 1902, and received the order from King Edward VII at Buckingham Palace on 8 August 1902.

Sir Henry Keppel died in London on 17 January 1904 and was buried at the churchyard of St Mary the Virgin in Winkfield.

== Family ==
On 25 February 1839 Keppel married Katherine Louisa Crosbie, daughter of General Sir John Crosbie. Keppel's relationship with Lady Grey was discovered by her husband Sir George Grey in 1860, and this, together with accusations of infidelity against Sir George Grey, led to the breakdown of their marriage. Keppel married Jane Elizabeth West, daughter of Martin John West on 31 October 1861. By his second wife, he had one son, Colin Richard Keppel, and one daughter, Maria Walpole Keppel, who married Admiral Sir Frederick Tower Hamilton.

== Legacy ==
Keppel Harbour, a stretch of water at the southern tip of Singapore, was named in his honour as he had been instrumental in clearing the straits of pirates. The tower of St Mary's Church, Bishopstoke was built in 1909 to commemorate Keppel.

== Works ==
- Keppel, Henry (1846). The Expedition to Borneo of HMS. Dido for the Suppression of Piracy.
- Keppel, Henry (1853). A Visit to the Indian Archipelago in HMS Meander.
- Keppel, Henry (1899). A Sailor's Life under four Sovereigns (autobiography).

== Sources ==
- Darwin, Charles (1860). The Correspondence of Charles Darwin. Cambridge University Press. ISBN 9780521442411.
- Heathcote, Tony (2002). The British Admirals of the Fleet 1734–1995. Pen & Sword. ISBN 0-85052-835-6.
- O'Brien, Charles; Bailey, Bruce; Pevsner, Nikolaus; Lloyd, David W. (2018). Hampshire: South. The Buildings of England. London: Yale University Press. ISBN 978-0-300-22503-7.

Military offices
Preceded by Sir Frederick Grey	Commander-in-Chief, Cape of Good Hope Station; 1860	Succeeded by Sir Baldwin Walker
Preceded by Stephen Lushington	Commander-in-Chief, South East Coast of America Station; 1860–1861	Succeeded by Richard Warren
Preceded by Sir George King	Commander-in-Chief, China Station; 1867–1869	Succeeded by Sir Henry Kellett
Preceded by Sir Henry Codrington	Commander-in-Chief, Plymouth; 1872–1875	Succeeded by Sir Thomas Symonds
Honorary titles
Preceded by Sir James Hope	First and Principal Naval Aide-de-Camp; 1878–1879	Succeeded by Sir Astley Key
