= East Indies and China Station =

Commander-in-Chief, East Indies and China
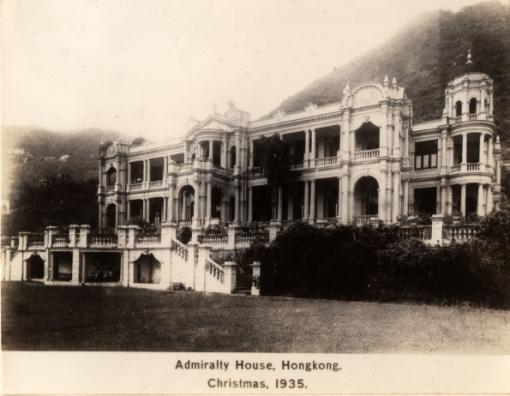
- Admiralty House, Hong Kong
- Active: 1831–1865
- Country: United Kingdom
- Branch: Royal Navy
- Type: Naval formation
- Garrison/HQ: Hong Kong

The Commander-in-Chief, East Indies and China was a formation of the Royal Navy from 1831 to 1865. Its naval area of responsibility was the Indian Ocean and the coasts of China and its navigable rivers.

The Commander-in-Chief was appointed in 1831; the appointment ceased to exist when it was separated into the East Indies Station and the China Station in 1865.

At the age of 67, Charles Austen was advanced to rear-admiral on 9 November 1846, and was appointed commander-in-chief for the East Indies and China on 14 January 1850, hoisting his flag the following day. He commanded the British expedition during the Second Anglo-Burmese War but died of cholera at Prome on 7 October 1852, at the age of 73. On 30 April 1852 Austen had been thanked for his services in Burma by the Governor-General of India, the Marquess of Dalhousie, who subsequently also formally recorded his regret for Austen's death.

In December 1852 Fleetwood Pellew returned to active service with his appointment as Commander-in-Chief, East Indies and China. His appointment caused some concern, with questions raised over the suitability of sending Pellew, considering his age and past background, and the unhealthy climate and tense diplomatic situation following the outbreak of the Second Anglo-Burmese War. Pellew raised his flag aboard HMS Winchester in April 1853, and by September 1854 he was off Hong Kong. Here he seems to have decided that he would not allow shore leave until the dangerous season for fevers and infections had passed, but neglected to make his reasoning known to his men. The crew were apparently in a mutinous mood, so Pellew ordered them to beat to quarters. When they refused, he sent the officers onto the lower deck to force them up at sword point. Several of the crew were wounded and the nascent mutiny was quashed. The news of these events was poorly received in Britain, The Times included several leading articles drawing attention to the mutiny on the Winchester, and the one on the Resistance many years before. Pellew was duly recalled by the Admiralty, never to serve at sea again.

James Stirling's final command was as Commander-in-Chief, China and the East Indies, and his flag, as Rear Admiral of the White, was hoisted aboard Winchester on 11 May 1854. Shortly afterwards news arrived that war had been declared on Russia (the Crimean War). Stirling was anxious to prevent Russian ships from sheltering in Japanese ports and menacing allied shipping and, after lengthy negotiations through the Nagasaki Magistrate, concluded the Anglo-Japanese Friendship Treaty. In November 1854, with Hong Kong Governor John Bowring, Stirling led a fleet up the Pearl River to Canton to support the Viceroy of Liangguang (modern day Guangdong and Guangxi) Ye Mingchen and his forces besieged by the Tiandihui army. The fleet carried weapons and ammunition, food and Qing reinforcements.

In August 1855, during the Crimean War, Winchester and Barracouta entered and first charted the waters of Peter the Great Gulf, while searching for the Russian squadron commanded by Vasily Zavoyko.

"In 1856 [Stirling] was recalled because he had failed in the primary naval duty of finding and destroying the Russian squadron - partly, perhaps, because of his preoccupation with the self-imposed task of negotiating with Japan."

Under Rear Admiral Michael Seymour's command after 1856, his ships were involved in operations arising from the attack on the British coaster Arrow. During the Second Opium War or "Arrow War," in China, Seymour commanded the Battle of the Bogue in November 1856, helped destroy the Chinese fleet in the Battle of Fatshan Creek in June 1857, captured Canton in December, and in 1858 he captured the forts on the Baihe (Hai River), compelling the Chinese government to consent to the Treaty of Tientsin.

== Commanders-in-Chief ==
Commanders-in-Chief included:
No = died in post

- Vice Admiral John Gore (1831-1834)
- Rear Admiral Thomas Capel (1834-1837)
- Rear Admiral Frederick Maitland (1837-1839) No
- Rear Admiral Gordon Bremer (January 1840-July 1840)
- Rear Admiral George Elliot (July 1840-November 1840)
- Rear Admiral Gordon Bremer (November 1840-October 1841)
- Rear Admiral William Parker (1841-1844)
- Rear Admiral Thomas Cochrane (1844-1846)
- Rear Admiral Samuel Inglefield (1846-1848) No
- Rear Admiral Francis Collier (1848-1849) No
- Rear Admiral Charles Austen (1850-1852) No
- Rear Admiral Fleetwood Pellew (1852-1854)
- Rear Admiral James Stirling (1854-1856)
- Rear Admiral Michael Seymour (1856-1859)
- Rear Admiral James Hope (1859-1862)
- Rear Admiral Augustus Kuper (1862-1864)
- Rear Admiral George King (1864-1865)
