= HMS Cressy (1853) =

Ship of the line of the Royal Navy

- A painting of Cressy at anchor off Naples by Tommaso de Simone

History

United Kingdom
- Name: Cressy
- Namesake: Battle of Crécy
- Ordered: 19 February 1844
- Builder: HM Dockyard, Chatham
- Laid down: April 1846
- Launched: 21 July 1853
- Completed: 9 March 1854
- Commissioned: 19 December 1853
- Out of service: 26 May 1861
- Fate: Sold for scrap, 1867

General characteristics (as built)
- Class & type: 80-gun, second-rate ship of the line
- Tons burthen: 3,707 bm
- Length: 195 ft 5 in (59.6 m) (gun deck)
- Beam: 55 ft (16.8 m)
- Draught: 25 ft 8 in (7.8 m) (deep load)
- Depth of hold: 21 ft (6.40080000 m)
- Installed power: Boilers; 1,076 ihp (802 kW)
- Propulsion: 1 screw; 1 single-expansion steam engine
- Sail plan: Full-rigged ship
- Speed: 7.2 knots (13.3 km/h; 8.3 mph)
- Complement: 750
- Armament: 80 muzzle-loading, smoothbore guns: Lower deck: 10 × 8 in (203 mm) shell guns + 18 × 32 pdr guns; Upper deck: 4 × 8 in shell guns + 24 × 32 pounders; Quarter deck & Forecastle: 24 × 32 pdrs

HMS Cressy was an 80-gun, second rate ship of the line built for the Royal Navy (RN) during the 1850s. The ship was converted to screw power while under construction. Completed in 1854, she played a minor role with the Baltic Fleet during the Crimean War of 1854–1856 against the Russian Empire. After the war Cressy was assigned to the Mediterranean Fleet until she was paid off in 1857. She served as a guard ship in 1858–1859. The ship was recommissioned for the Channel Squadron in 1859 although she was soon transferred to the Mediterranean Fleet. Two years later the ship was paid off. Cressy was sold for scrap in 1867 and subsequently broken up.

== Background and description ==
Cressy was designed by three graduates of the School of Naval Architecture who had written to the First Naval Lord, Admiral George Cockburn, complaining that the Surveyor of the Navy, William Symonds's designs lacked a scientific basis and were "mere speculation". Cockburn greatly disliked Symonds' designs which were radically different to previous practice, and ordered them to form a Committee of Naval Architecture at Chatham on 27 April 1842 to design three ships, one of which was Cressy, in accordance with their ideas. This provided a scientific route for Cockburn to attack Symonds and his designs. Their design was completed on 16 October 1843 and was a compromise in hull shape between Sir Robert Seppings's designs of the 1820s and Symonds's. The ship was considered to have too much tumblehome and used more curved timber than any other ship built since 1815. She proved to be a middling performer under both sail and steam.

The committee designed Cressy as an 84-gun, second rate. She was intended to measure 198 feet 5 inches (60.5 m) at the gun deck and 162 feet 1 inch (49.4 m) at the keel. She would have had a beam of 55 feet (16.8 m), a depth of hold of 21 feet 8 inches (6.6 m) and had a tonnage of 2,537 80/94 tons burthen. Her crew would have numbered 750 officers and ratings. The ship had the usual three-masted full-ship rig. Cressy's muzzle-loading, smoothbore armament was intended to consist of twenty-four 32-pounder (56 cwt) guns (Note: "Cwt" is the abbreviation for hundredweight, 56 cwt referring to the weight of the gun.) and six 8 in (203 mm) (65 cwt) shell guns on the lower gun deck. The upper gun deck was planned to have had thirty 56 cwt, 32-pounders and a pair of 8-inch shell guns. Between her forecastle and quarterdeck, the ship would have carried twenty-two 32-pounder guns, six long and sixteen short.

=== Screw conversion ===
Still under construction, Captain Baldwin Wake Walker, the new Surveyor of the Navy, ordered Cressy to be converted into an 80-gun, screw-propelled ship of the line in 1852 over concerns about the number of French screw ships of the line under construction. To evaluate the effects of the ship's fuller hull form on the propeller's efficiency, the least possible alteration to the stern was to be made and the ship was not to be lengthened as was usually done. Cressy displaced 3,707 long tons (3,766 t) and had a draught of 25 feet 8 inches (7.8 m). The ship was fitted with a 400-nominal horsepower, single-expansion steam engine built by Maudslay, Sons and Field. Her boilers produced enough steam that the two-cylinder, horizontal engine produced 1,076 indicated horsepower (802 kW) which gave the ship a speed of 7.2 knots (13.3 km/h; 8.3 mph) during her sea trials.

The ship's lower gun deck armament consisted of ten 8-inch shell guns and eighteen (56 cwt) 32-pounders. The upper gun deck had four 8-inch shell guns and twenty-four 32-pounders of 50 cwt. The combined armament of the forecastle and quarterdeck totalled twenty-four 42 cwt 32-pounders.

== Construction and career ==
Named after the 1346 Battle of Crécy, Cressy was the second ship of her name to serve in the RN. Ordered on 19 February 1842, the ship was laid down at HM Dockyard, Chatham in April 1846, but was reordered as a screw-propelled ship on 24 November 1852. Work began five days later and she was launched on 21 July 1853. Cressy was commissioned by Captain Richard Warren on 10 February 1854 and was completed at Sheerness Dockyard on 9 March. She was assigned to the Baltic Fleet and while moving through Køge Bay, Denmark, on 1 April, Cressy and the 91-gun Princess Royal accidentally collided with each other, neither much damaged. Cressy was present when the fleet rendezvoused with the French fleet on 13 June at Barösund and participated in the reconnaissance of the naval base and fortress of Kronstadt later that month. The ship was part of the force based near Nargen Island (now Naissaar) blockading Reval (now Tallinn) and the southern coast of the Gulf of Finland by late 1854. By 19 October, bad weather had forced the ships to withdraw to Kiel, Germany, where they blockaded the entrance to the Baltic Sea until December when they were ordered home.

The British returned to the Baltic in 1855 with the anchorage at Nargen Island reoccupied on 10 May. During a storm off the island of Seskar at the end of August, Cressy's rudder broke. The ship departed Nargen on 26 October and stopped at Kiel, before heading home. She was then transferred to the Mediterranean Fleet and returned home to be paid off on 15 May 1857. Cressy was recommissioned on 1 March 1858 as the guard ship at Sheerness by Captain Edward Halsted. She was transferred to the Channel Squadron in May 1859 under the command of Captain Charles Elliot and then to the Mediterranean in July. Captain Thomas Harvey relieved Elliot on 26 September 1860. The ship returned home and was paid off on 26 May 1861. Cressy was sold for scrap to Castle & Beech in 1867 and subsequently broken up at their facility in Charlton, London.

== Bibliography ==
- Brown, David K. (2015) [1990]. Before the Ironclad: Warship Design and Development 1815–1860. Naval Institute Press. ISBN 978-1-59114-605-6.
- Clowes, William Laird (1901). The Royal Navy: A History from the Earliest Times to the Present. Vol. VI. Sampson Low, Marston.
- Colledge, J. J.; Warlow, Ben & Bush, Steve (2020). Ships of the Royal Navy: The Complete Record of all Fighting Ships of the Royal Navy from the 15th Century to the Present (5th revised and updated ed.). Seaforth Publishing. ISBN 978-1-5267-9327-0.
- Greenhill, Basil & Giffard, Ann (1988). The British Assault on Finland 1854–1855: A Forgotten Naval War. Naval Institute Press. ISBN 0-87021-057-2.
- Lambert, Andrew D. (1984). Battleships in Transition: The Creation of the Steam Battlefleet 1815-1860. Conway Maritime Press. ISBN 0-85177-315-X.
- Lambert, Andrew (2011) [1990]. The Crimean War: British Grand Strategy Against Russia, 1853–56 (Second ed.). Ashgate. ISBN 978-1-4094-1011-9.
- Lambert, Andrew D. (1991). The Last Sailing Battlefleet: Maintaining Naval Mastery 1815 - 1850. Conway Maritime Press. ISBN 0-85177-591-8.
- Manning, T. D. & Walker, C. F. (1959). British Warship Names. Putnam. OCLC 838607.
- Winfield, Rif (2014). British Warships in the Age of Sail 1817–1863: Design, Construction, Careers and Fates. Seaforth Publishing. ISBN 978-1-84832-169-4.
