= Richard Warren (Royal Navy officer) =

Royal Navy Admiral (1806–1875)

Admiral Richard Warren
- Born: 1806
- Died: 29 July 1875 (aged 68–69)
- Military career
- Allegiance: United Kingdom
- Branch: Royal Navy
- Service years: 1822–1870
- Rank: Admiral
- Commands: HMS Magicienne; HMS Trincomalee; HMS Cressy; South East Coast of America Station; Nore Command
- Conflicts: Crimean War

Admiral Richard Laird Warren (1806 – 29 July 1875) was a Royal Navy officer who went on to be Commander-in-Chief, The Nore.

== Naval career ==
Born the son of Admiral Frederick Warren, Warren joined the Royal Navy in 1822. Promoted to captain in 1839, he commanded HMS Magicienne and then HMS Trincomalee. The Trincomalee was assigned to provide hurricane relief and to search vessels for slave-trade activities on the North American Station.

He also commanded HMS Cressy in the Black Sea during the Crimean War. He was appointed Commander-in-chief, South East Coast of America Station in 1861 and Commander-in-Chief, The Nore in 1869 and retired in 1870.

== Family ==
In 1844 he married Eleanor Charlotte Warren.

Military offices
Preceded by Henry Keppel	Commander-in-Chief, South East Coast of America Station; 1861–1864	Succeeded by Charles Elliot
Preceded by Sir Baldwin Walker	Commander-in-Chief, The Nore; 1869–1870	Succeeded by Sir Charles Elliot
