= HMS Nankin =

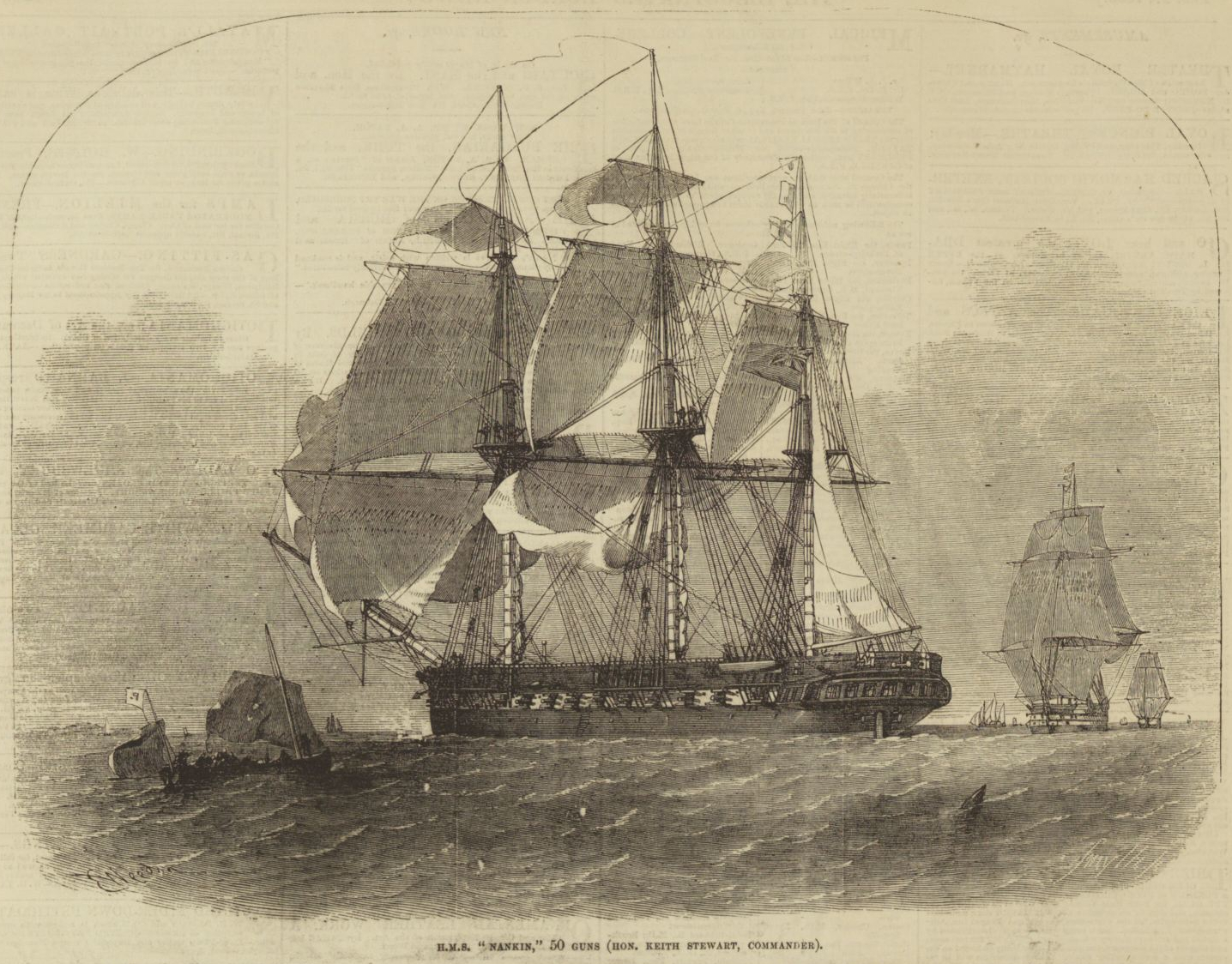
1855 picture of Nankin from the side

HMS Nankin was a fourth rate frigate of the Royal Navy. It was built by Oliver Lang in Woolwich dockyard in 1850 and named after the city of Nanking (now named Nanjing). It could hold 500 men and 50 guns, including a variety of guns, ranging from 32-pounder to 68-pounder. For structural reasons, the navy decided that eight guns would be mounted on the gangways amidships, but this also meant that no spar-decked frigates mounted guns in its waists. It was involved in the Second Opium War from 1856 to 1859, but was then moved back to Pembroke dock. It was sold in 1895.

== Dimensions ==
Dimensions
Displacement	2540 tons
Hull material	Wood
Length	185 feet(Including bow)
Width	50 feet
