= Battle of the Bogue (1856) =

Coordinates: 22°47′20″N 113°36′59″E

- Part of the Second Opium War
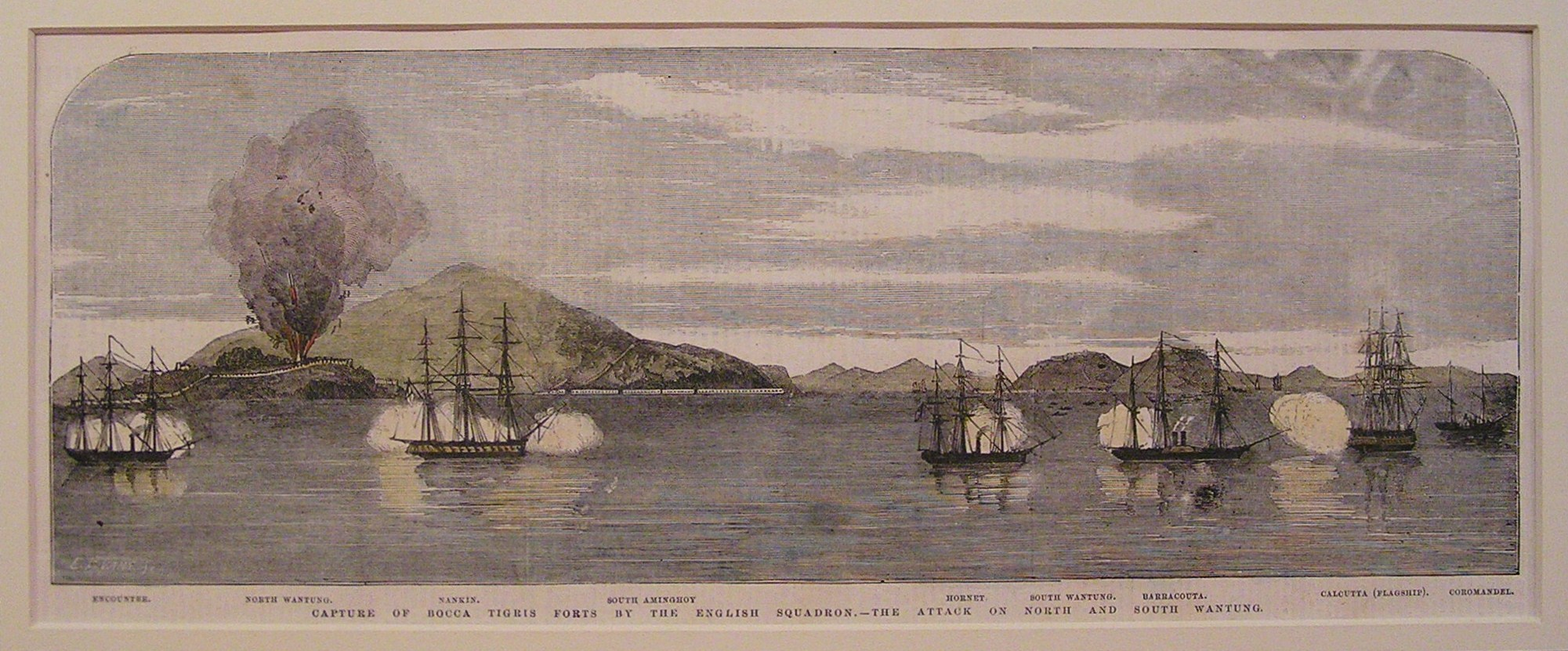
- Attack on the North and South Wangtong Islands
Date	12–13 November 1856
Location	Humen, Guangdong, China
Result	British victory

Belligerents
United Kingdom	Qing China

Commanders and leaders
Michael Seymour	Ye Mingchen

Strength
6 ships	2,000 (500 in each fort); 410 guns

Casualties and losses
1 killed 5 wounded	Unknown; 410 guns lost 4 forts captured

The Battle of the Bogue was fought between British and Chinese forces at the Humen strait (Bogue), Guangdong province, China, on 12–13 November 1856 during the Second Opium War. The British captured the forts in the Wangtong Islands on 12 November and the forts in Anunghoy Island the next day.

== Background ==
Before the battle, Rear-Admiral Michael Seymour, commander-in-chief of British forces, sent a summons to the Chinese commander of the Bogue forts:

The British Admiral wishes to spare life, and is not at war with the Chinese; and as it is necessary for him to hold possession of the Bogue Forts, until the conduct of the Viceroy Yeh can be referred to the Emperor of Pekin, one hour will be given for the purpose of clearing out; if this offer is at once accepted, boats will be permitted to pass to and from the main land and the Wantungs. In this case, the forts will remain uninjured, ready to be returned in the same state to the Chinese when these differences are over; and the rebels will neither be allowed to pass the Bogue Forts, nor to enter them whilst in our possession.

After an hour, Seymour received an answer; the Chinese commander could not give up the forts because he would "lose his head" and must therefore fight.

== Battle ==
On the 12 November, the British squadron attacked the two Wangtong Island forts, which were fully manned and had over 200 guns mounted. Stinkpots were thrown at the British who first entered the forts. The Chinese, who stood to their guns up to the moment of the British entering the embrasures, had boats ready to escape. The forts were captured after what Seymour called a "considerable, though ill-directed" resistance of about an hour. The British casualties were one killed and five wounded on board HMS Nankin. On the 13 November, the British attacked and captured the Anunghoy forts, which mounted 210 guns. Seymour reported that although "some resistance" was offered, there were no British casualties.

== Gallery ==
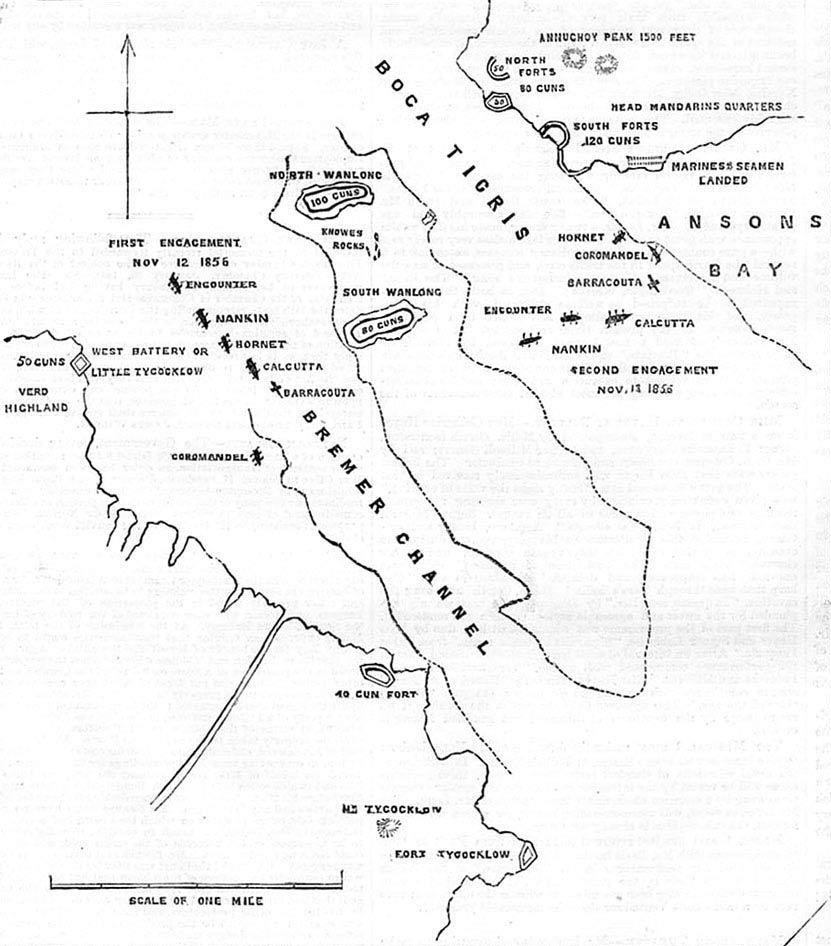
Map of the battle

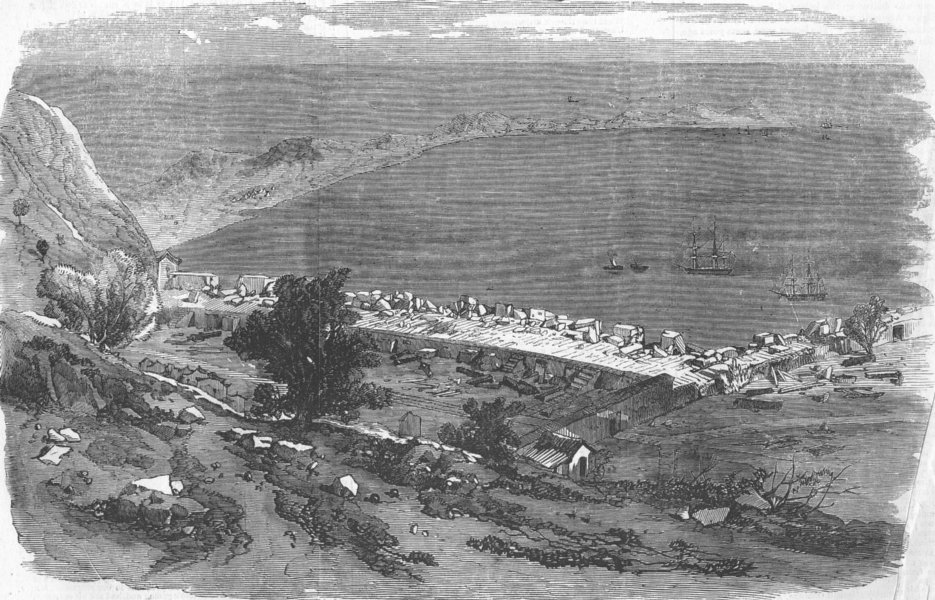
Interior of the Anunghoy forts after their demolition by the Nankin and Calcutta

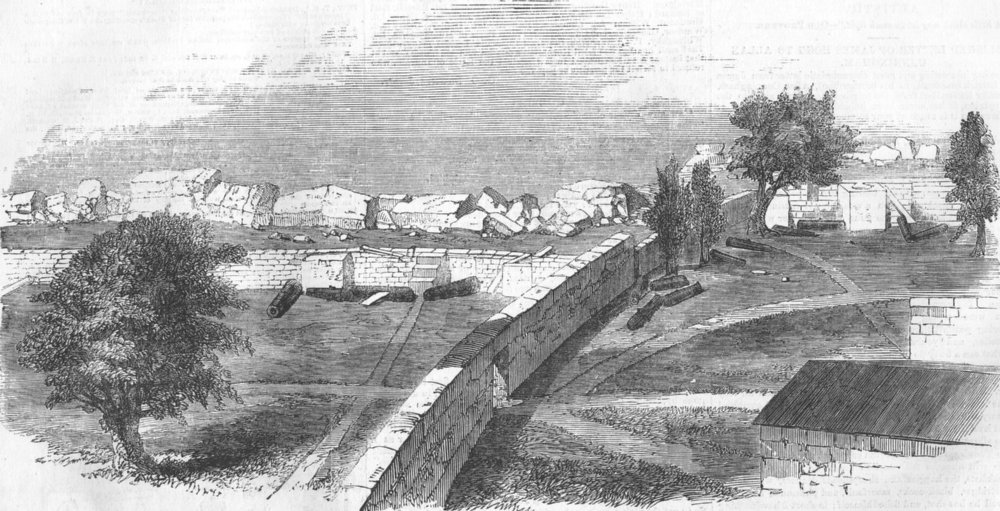
Second sketch of Anunghoy
