= Battle of Escape Creek =

Battle of Second Opium War (25–27 May 1857)

Coordinates: 23.038°N 113.522°E

- Part of the Second Opium War
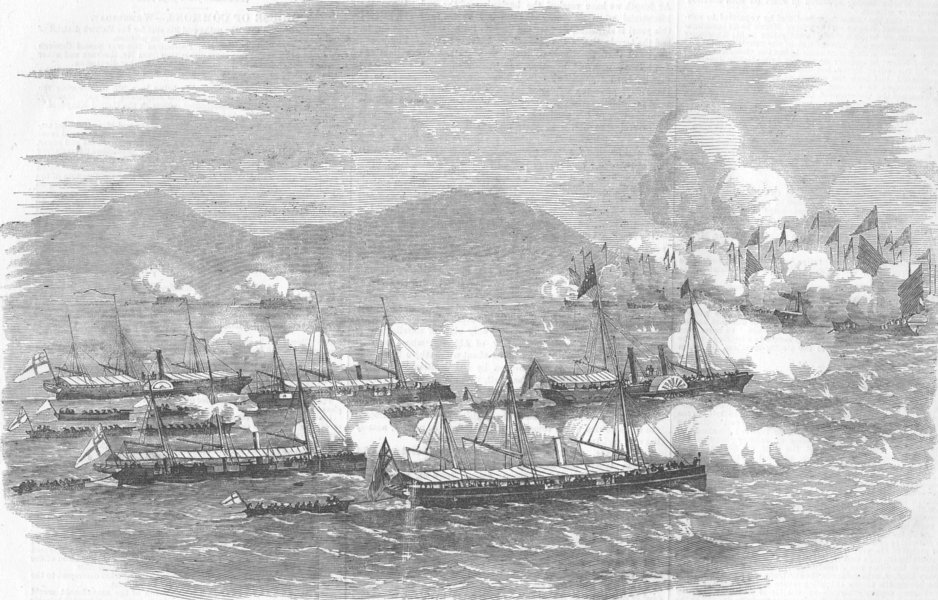
- Commodore Elliot leading gunboats to attack the Mandarin junks
Date	25–27 May 1857
Location	Escape Creek, Guangdong, China
Result	British victory

Belligerents
United Kingdom	Qing China

Commanders and leaders
(United Kingdom) Charles Elliot	Admiral Sonhay

Strength
13 gunboats 7 cutters & gigs	41 war-junks

Casualties and losses
31 killed or wounded 1 gig destroyed	27 junks captured or destroyed

The Battle of Escape Creek was a naval engagement fought between the United Kingdom's Royal Navy and the Qing Chinese naval force on 25–27 May 1857 during the Second Opium War. Commodore Charles Elliot's squadron chased the war-junks at Escape Creek (present-day East River) and then, once the British ships were grounded as the river narrowed, they chased them in the ships' boats until all the junks had been overhauled.

== Gallery ==
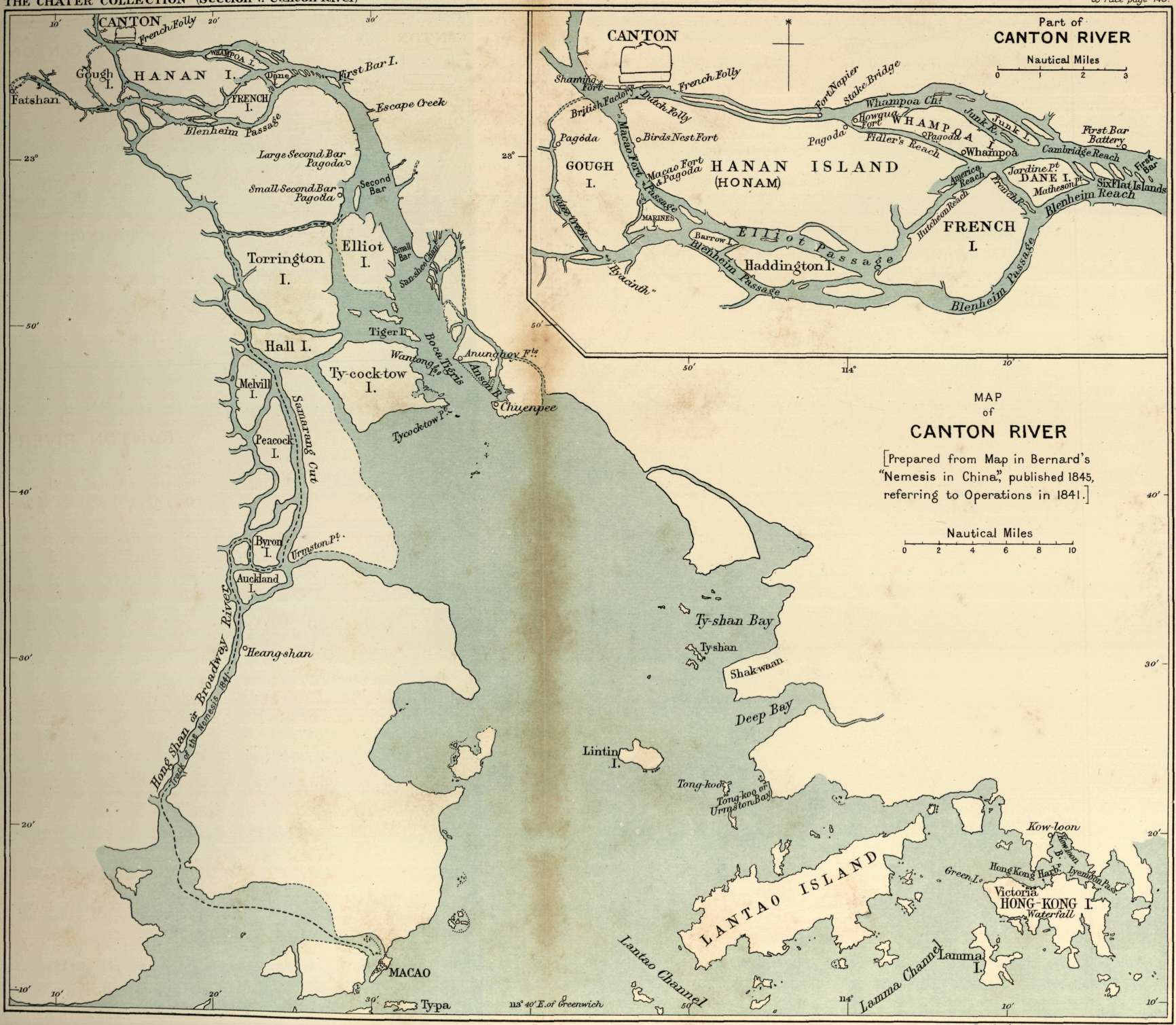
Map of Canton area showing Escape Creek near the top

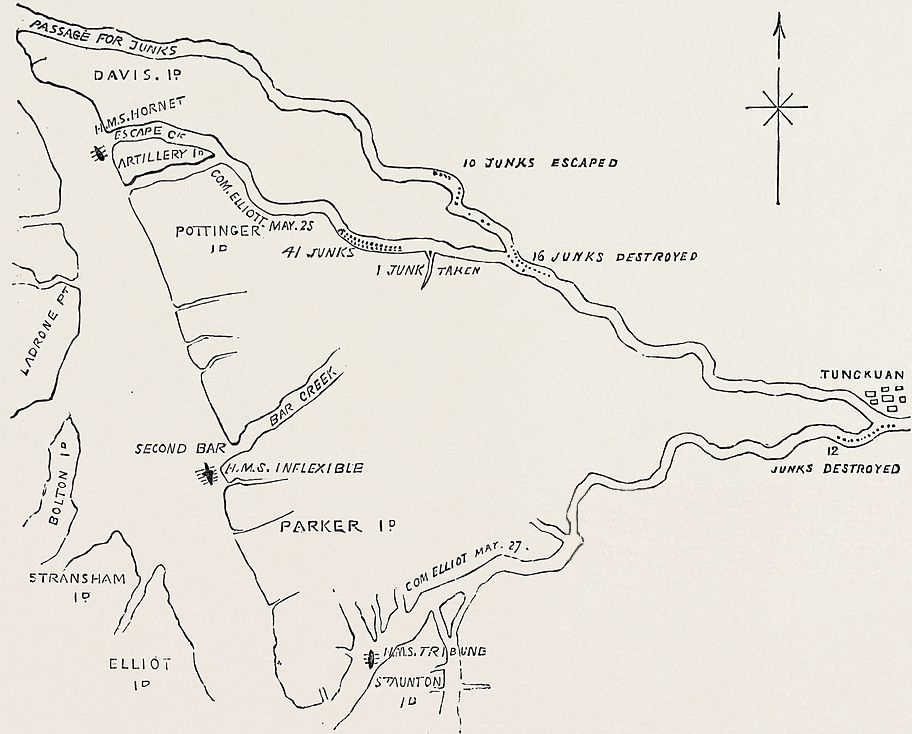
Map of the engagements

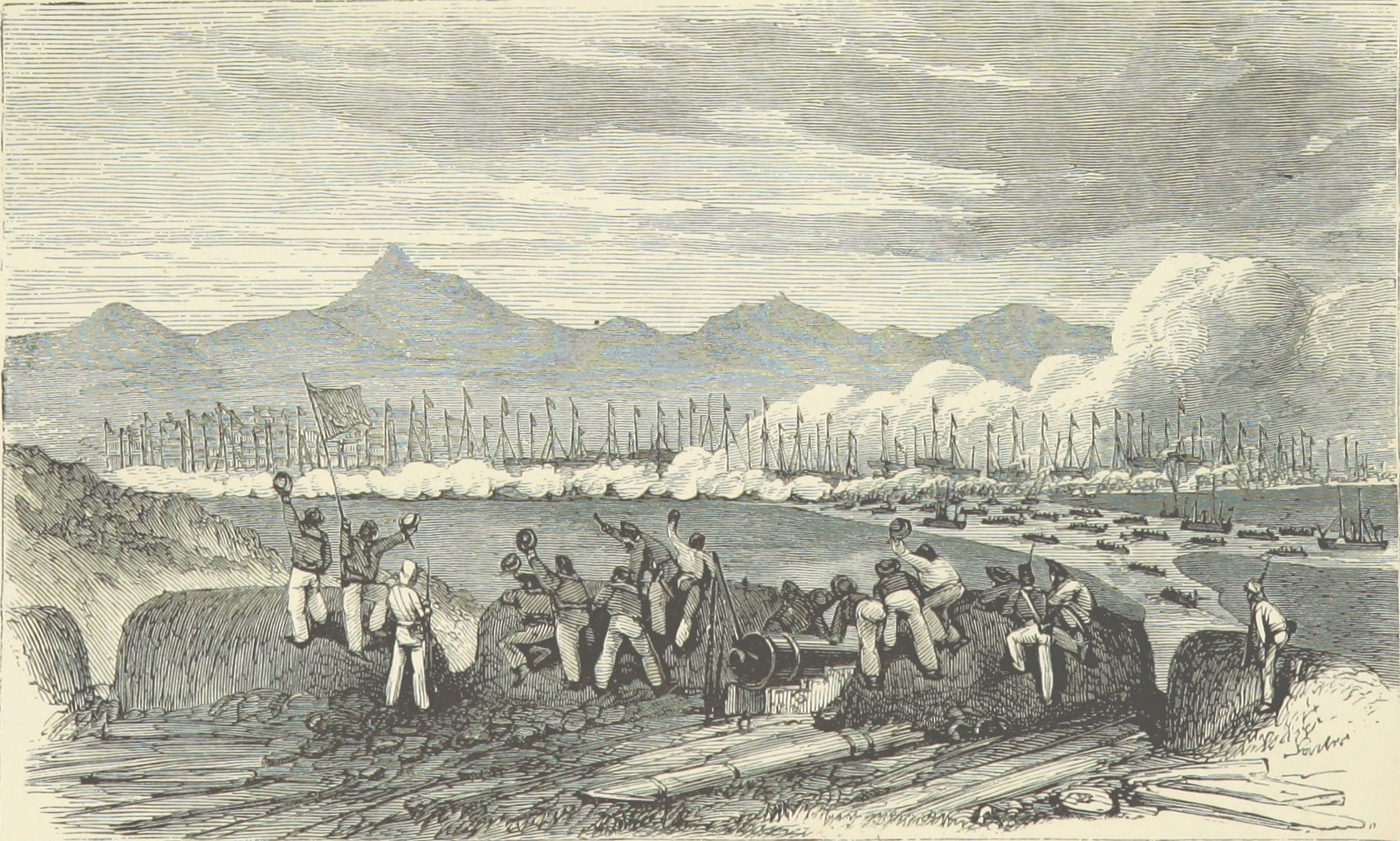
Attack on the junks

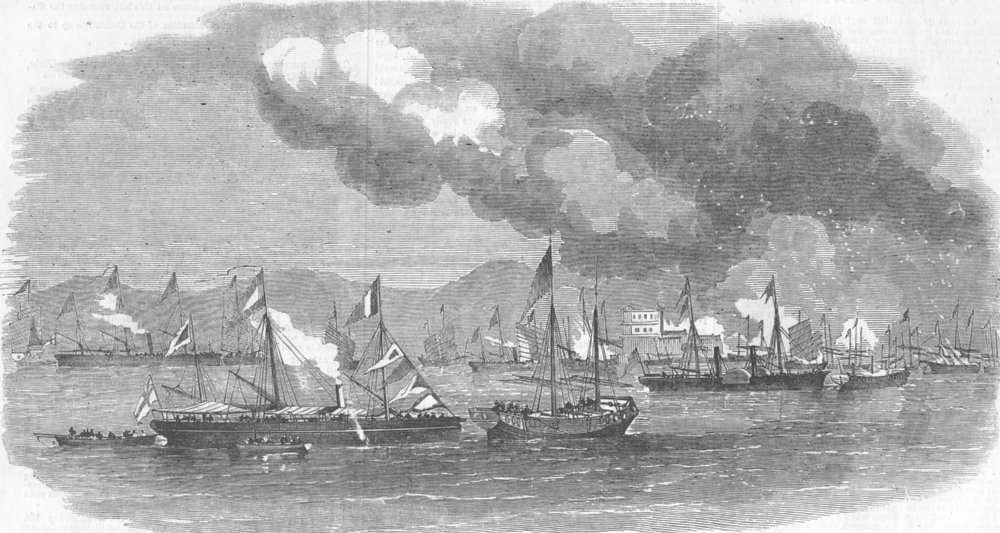
Burning of 27 captured junks
