= Michael Seymour (Royal Navy officer, born 1802) =

Royal Navy Admiral (1802–1887)

Admiral Sir Michael Seymour GCB
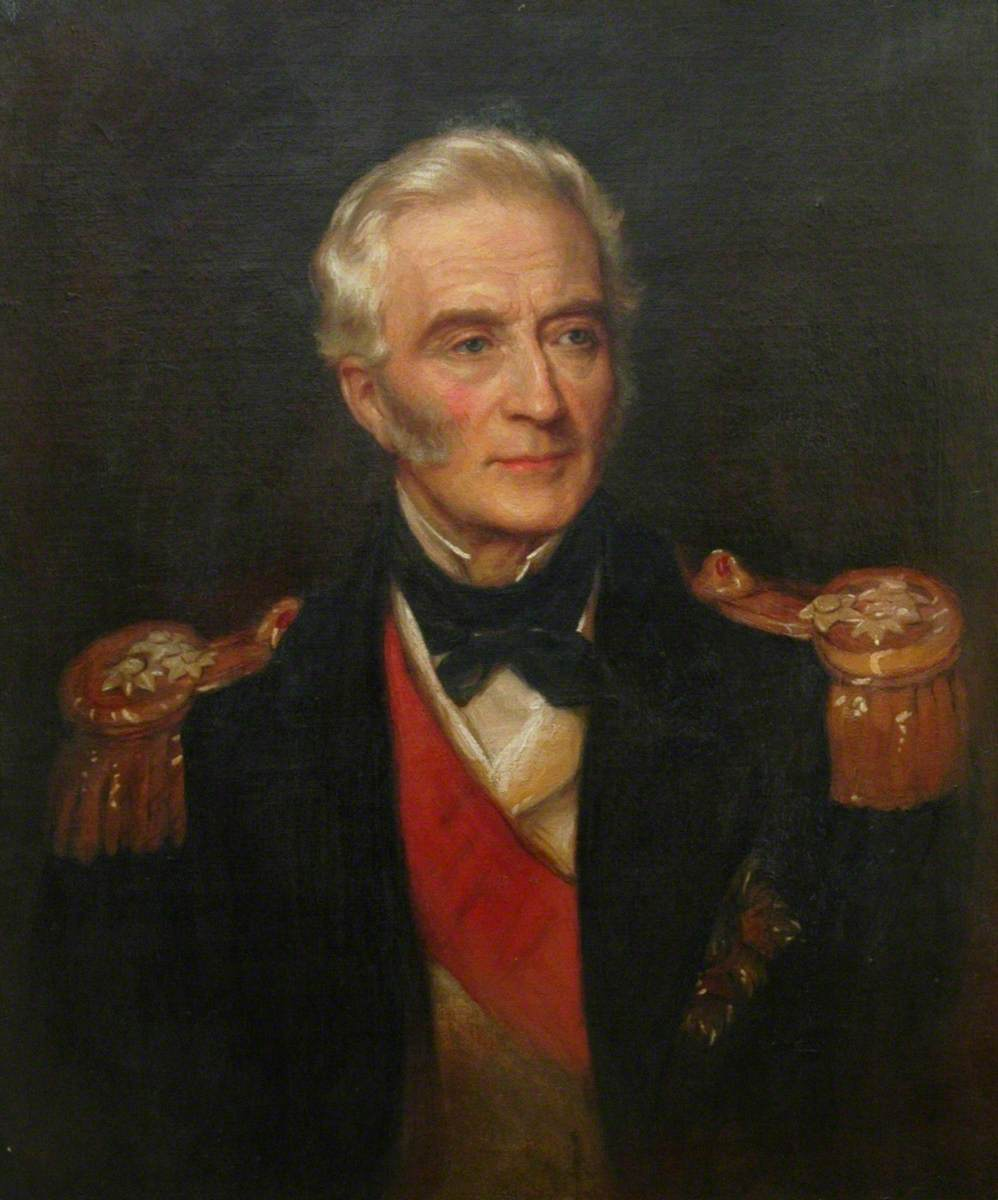
- Portrait of Admiral Seymour
- Born: 3 December 1802
- Died: 23 February 1887 (aged 84); Horndean, Hampshire, England
- Military career
- Allegiance: United Kingdom
- Branch: Royal Navy
- Service years: 1813–1870
- Rank: Admiral
- Commands: HMS Challenger; HMS Britannia; HMS Powerful; HMS Vindictive; China Station; Portsmouth Command
- Conflicts: Crimean War; Second Opium War
- Awards: Knight Grand Cross of the Order of the Bath

Admiral Sir Michael Seymour, GCB (3 December 1802 – 23 February 1887) was a Royal Navy officer who went on to be Commander-in-Chief, Portsmouth.

== Naval career ==
Born the third son of Admiral Sir Michael Seymour, 1st Baronet, Michael Seymour entered the Royal Navy in 1813. He was made lieutenant in 1822, commander in 1824 and was posted captain in 1826. From 1833 to 1835 he was captain of the survey ship HMS Challenger, and was wrecked in her off the coast of Chile. In 1841 he was given command of HMS Britannia and then of HMS Powerful. In 1845 he took over HMS Vindictive.

From 1851 to 1854 he was Commodore Superintendent of Devonport Dockyard. In 1854 he served under Sir Charles Napier in the Baltic during the Crimean War. He was promoted to Rear-Admiral that same year and, when the Baltic campaign was resumed in 1855 under Admiral the Hon. Richard Dundas, Seymour was second in command.

On 19 February 1856 he was appointed commander-in-chief of the East Indies and China Station. Flying his flag in HMS Calcutta, he conducted operations arising from the attack on the British coaster Arrow. During the Arrow War in China, he commanded the Battle of the Bogue in November 1856, helped destroy the Chinese fleet in the Battle of Fatshan Creek in June 1857, captured Canton in December, and in 1858 he captured the forts on the Baihe (Hai River), compelling the Chinese government to consent to the Treaty of Tientsin. He was made GCB in 1859. He sat as a Liberal Member of Parliament for Devonport from 1859 to 1863. In 1863 he was made Commander-in-Chief, Portsmouth, a post he held until 1866. He retired in 1870.

Seymour Road in Hong Kong Island was named after him.

== Family ==
In 1829 he married Dorothy Knighton: they had a son and three daughters. He was the uncle of Sir Edward Hobart Seymour, also a British admiral.

== Art work ==
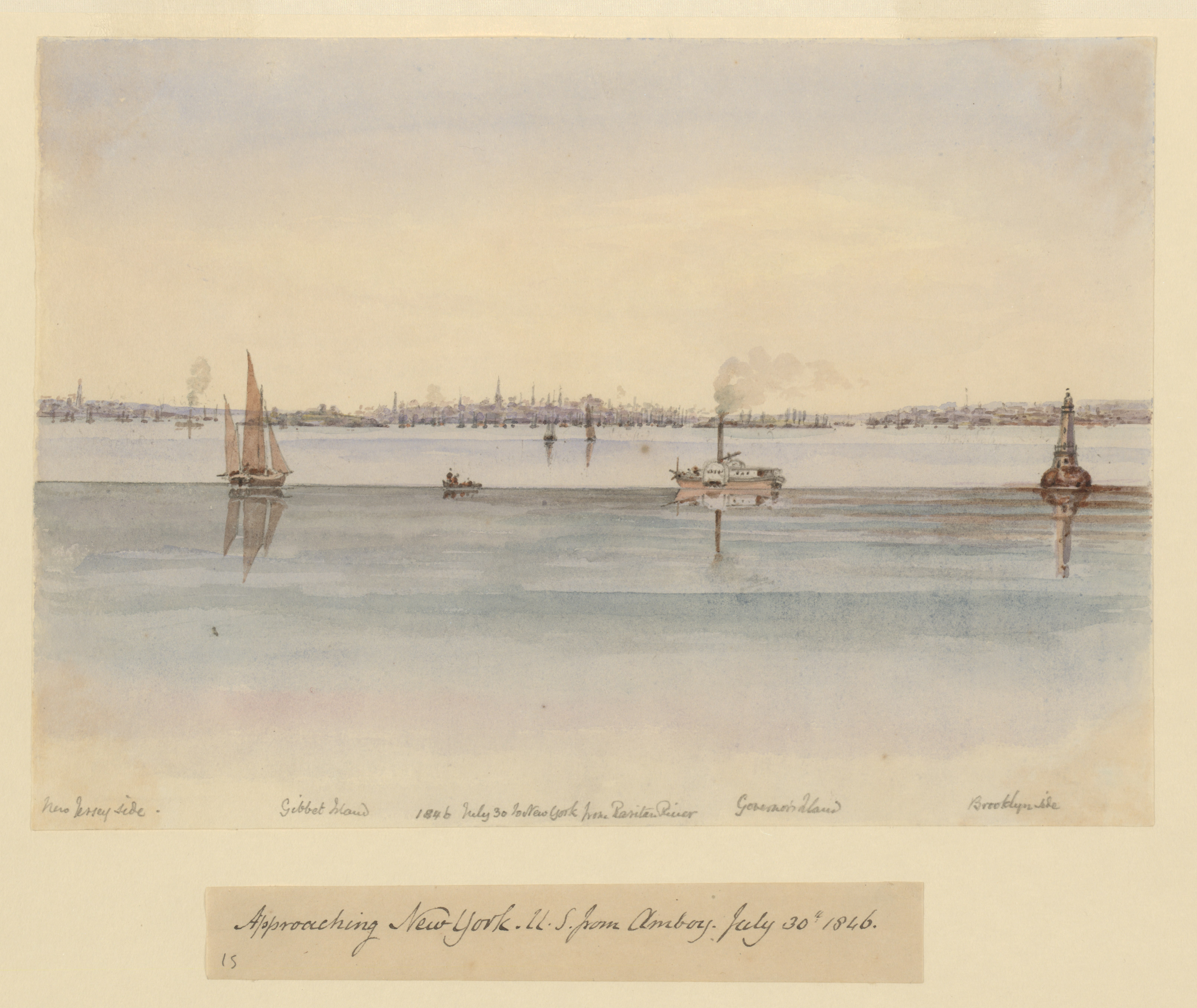
1846 July 30, to New York from Raritan River

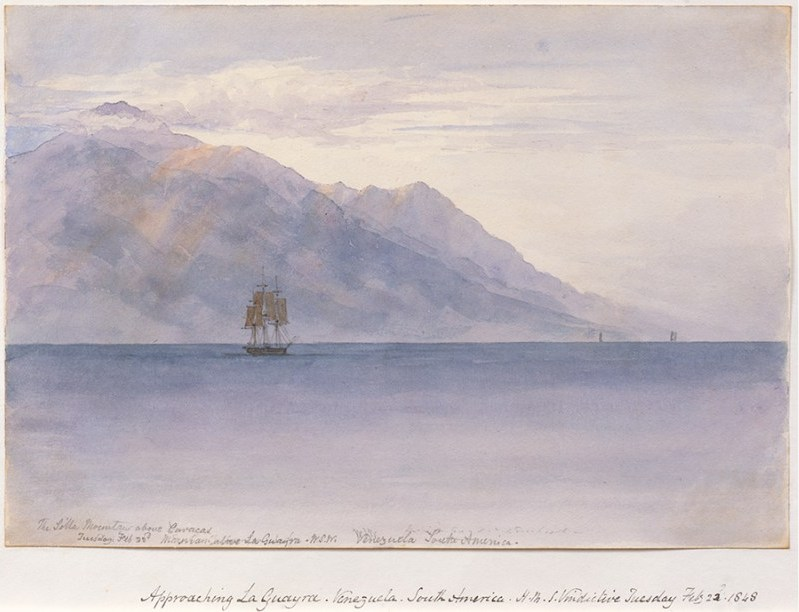
Approaching La Guaira, Venezuela

Military offices
Preceded by Sir James Stirling	Commander-in-Chief, East Indies and China Station; 1856–1859	Succeeded by Sir James Hope
Parliament of the United Kingdom
Preceded by Thomas Erskine Perry and James Wilson	Member of Parliament for Devonport; 1859–1863; With: James Wilson, to August 1859; Sir Arthur William Buller, from August 1859	Succeeded by William Ferrand and Sir Arthur William Buller
Military offices
Preceded by Sir Henry Bruce	Commander-in-Chief, Portsmouth; 1863–1866	Succeeded by Sir Thomas Pasley
Honorary titles
Preceded by Sir Provo Wallis	Vice-Admiral of the United Kingdom; 1876–1887	Office abolished (recreated in 1901 with Sir Michael Culme-Seymour, Bt)
