= Japan Foundation Awards =

Japan Foundation Awardsl
- Awarded for: individuals or organizations that have significantly contributed to the promotion of international mutual understanding and friendship through their academic, artistic, or cultural activities and are expected to continue to do so
- Country: Varies
- Presented by: Japan Foundation (JF)
- First award: 1973; 53 years ago
- Final award: 2021
- Currently held by: Hirokazu KOREEDA（Fim Director）[Japan] Mayumi Miyata（Shō (Japanese wind instrument) performer）[Japan] Faculty of Japanese Language and Culture, VNU University of Languages and International Studies / Faculty of Japanese, Foreign Trade University / Department of Japanese Studies, Hanoi University [Vietnam] Irmela Hijiya-Kirschnereit [Germany]
- Website: www.jpf.go.jp

The Japan Foundation Awards honor individuals and organizations for significant contributions to "the enhancement of mutual understanding between Japan and other countries."

== History ==
Activities in an academic or cultural field have been presented by the Japan Foundation annually since 1973.

In 1985, Eleanor Harz Jorden was the first woman to receive a Japan Foundation Award.

In 2020, the award selection that continued for 47 years was canceled for the first time due to COVID-19 pandemic. However, the nominated application for that year was carried over to the following year, and in 2021 four recipients were listed.

== Description ==
The awards help to further the mission of the foundation in language and culture.

Two types of awards (the Japan Foundation Awards and the Japan Foundation Special Prizes) previously composed the Japan Foundation Awards. But these awards are integrated into “The Japan Foundation Awards” in three categories: "Arts and Culture", "Japanese Language", and "Japanese Studies and Intellectual Exchange" from 2008.

== Recipients ==
=== Japan Foundation Awards ===
Year	Recipients	Country
1973	Serge Elisseeff (Professor, Harvard University / Japanese Studies)	U.S.A.
1973	The International House of Japan, Inc.	Japan
1973	Japan Society	U.S.A.
1973	Sophia University	Japan
1974	James William Fulbright (Former Senator)	U.S.A.
1974	Bernard Howell Leach (Potter)	U.K.
1975	Edwin Oldfather Reischauer (Professor, Harvard University; Former Ambassador to Japan / Japanese Studies)	U.S.A.
1975	Kojiro Yoshikawa (Professor Emeritus, Kyoto University; Chairman, The Institute of Eastern Culture)	Japan
1976	* John Whitney Hall (Professor, Yale University / Modern Japanese History)	U.S.A.
1976	Robert E. Ward (Professor, Stanford University / Politics)	U.S.A.
1976	The Toyo Bunko	Japan
1977	Ronald Philip Dore (Professor, University of Sussex)	U.K.
1977	Choei Ishibashi (Chairman, International Medical Society of Japan / Pediatrics)	Japan
1977	Meiji Newspapers and Magazine Library, the Faculty of Laws, the University of Tokyo	Japan
1978	Frank James Daniels (Professor Emeritus, University of London / Japanese Language Teaching Methodology)	U.K.
1978	James Lanius Stewart (Representative in Japan, The Asian Foundation)	U.S.A.
1978	Yasaka Takagi (Professor Emeritus, University of Tokyo; Member, The Japan Academy / U.S. Political History)	Japan
1979	Charles Burton Fahs (Former Minister at U.S. Embassy in Tokyo; Former Professor, Miami University)	U.S.A.
1979	Robert Guillain (Journalist)	France
1979	Shigeharu Matsumoto (Chairman, The International House of Japan, Inc.)	Japan
1980	George Cyril Allen (Professor Emeritus, University of London / Japanese Studies)	U.K.
1980	Hugh Borton (Senior Researcher, Asian Institute, Columbia University)	U.S.A.
1980	Shinobu Iwamura (Professor Emeritus, Kyoto University / Eastern Studies)	Japan
1981	Ungku Abdul Aziz (Vice Chancellor, University of Malaya / Economics)	Malaysia
1981	George Richard Storry (Professor Emeritus, University of Oxford / Japanese Studies)	U.K.
1981	The Institute of Eastern Culture	Japan
1982	Yoshitaro Amano (Honorary Director, The Museo Amano of Peru)	Peru
1982	Marius Berthus Jansen (Professor, Princeton University / Japanese Studies)	U.S.A.
1982	Akira Kurosawa (Film Director)	Japan
1983	Donald Keene (Professor, Columbia University / Japanese Literature)	U.S.A.
1983	René Sieffert (President, l'Institut National des Langues et Civilisations Orientales [INALCO])	France
1983	Shin'ichi Suzuki (President & Director, Talent Education Institute)	Japan
1984	Sir John Grenfell Crawford (Former Chancellor, Australian National University / Economics)	Australia
1984	Yoichi Maeda (Managing Director, The International House of Japan, Inc.)	Japan
1984	Edward George Seidensticker (Professor, Columbia University / Japanese Literature)	U.S.A.
1985	Bernard Frank (Professor, College de France / Japanese Literature, Religious Thought)	France
1985	Eleanor Harz Jorden (Professor, Cornell University / Linguistics, Japanese Language Teaching)	U.S.A.
1986	Fosco Maraini (President, Italian Association for Japanese Studies / Anthropology)	Italy
1986	The Japan Society of Northern California	U.S.A.
1987	James William Morley (Professor, Columbia University / International Relations)	U.S.A.
1987	Chie Nakane (Professor Emerita, University of Tokyo / Social Anthropology)	Japan
1988	Seiji Ozawa (Music Director, Boston Symphony Orchestra)	Japan
1988	Xia Yan (Vice-President, All-China Federation of Literary and Art Circles)	China
1989	David MacEachron (Advisor to the Board of Directors, the Japan Society (NY))	U.S.A.
1989	Alexander Slawik (Professor Emeritus, The University of Vienna / Ethnology, Asian Studies)	Austria
1990	Wieslaw Roman Kotanski (Professor, The University of Warsaw / Japanese Studies)	Poland
1990	Tadao Umesao (Director-General, National Museum of Ethnology)	Japan
1991	Byong-sam Han (Director-General, National Museum of Korea / Anthropology)	Korea
1991	Ian Nish (Professor Emeritus, London School of Economics, University of London / Anglo-Japanese relations)	U.K.
1992	Sutan Takdir Alisjahbana (Rector, Universitas Nasional / Literature)	Indonesia
1992	Frits Vos (Professor Emeritus, Leiden University / Japanese Studies)	Netherlands
1993	Josef Pittau, S.J. (President, The Pontifical Gregorian University)	Italy
1993	Toru Takemitsu (Composer)	Japan
1994	Toshio Kawatake (Professor Emeritus, Waseda University)	Japan
1994	Heinrich Pfeiffer (Secretary General, Alexander von Humboldt Foundation)	Germany
1995	Donald Richie (Writer / Film Historian)	U.S.A.
1995	Soshitsu Sen (Grand Master, Urasenke Tradition of Tea)	Japan
1996	O-Young Lee (Chair Professor, Ewha Womans University)	Korea
1996	Ezra Feivel Vogel (Director, Fairbank Center for East-Asia Research, Harvard University)	U.S.A.
1997	Roger Goepper (Professor, University of Cologne)	Germany
1997	Ping-hua Sun (President, The China-Japan Friendship Association)	China
1998	Ikuma Dan (Composer, Member of the Art Academy of Japan)	Japan
1998	Robert Anthony Scalapino (Robson Research Professor of Government Emeritus, University of California at Berkeley)	U.S.A.
1999	Frank Bray Gibney (President, The Pacific Basin Institute at Pomona College)	U.S.A.
1999	Wolfgang Sawallisch (Conductor, Music Director of the Philadelphia Orchestra Honorary Conductor Laureate of the NHK Symphony Orchestra)	Germany
2000	Myong Kwan Chi (Director, Institute of Japanese Studies, Hallym University)	Korea
2000	Yoneo Ishii (President, Kanda University of International Studies)	Japan
2001	William G. Beasley (Emeritus Professor of the History of the Far East, University of London)	U.K
2001	Ikuo Hirayama (Artist)	Japan
2002	Gerald L. Curtis (Burgess Professor of Political Science, Columbia University)	U.S.A.
2002	Makoto Ooka (Poet)	Japan
2003	Yoshiaki Ishizawa (Professor, Faculty of Foreign Studies, Sophia University)	Japan
2003	Josef Kreiner (Director, Institute of Japanese Studies, The University of Bonn)	Austria
2004	Toshiko Akiyoshi (Jazz Pianist, Jazz Music Composer)	Japan
2005	Hayao Miyazaki (Animated Film Director)	Japan
2006	Joe and Etsuko Price (Directors, The Shin'enKan Foundation)	U.S.A.
2007	Royall Tyler (Former Professor and Head of the Japan Centre, Faculty of Asian Studies, Australian National University)	Australia
2008	Arts and Culture: Marco Muller (Director of the Venice International Film Festival)	Italy
2008	Japanese Language: Angela Hondru (Professor of Japanese Literature and Civilization, Hyperion University)	Romania
2008	Japanese Studies and Intellectual Exchange: Kenneth B. Pyle (Professor, University of Washington)	U.S.A.
2009	Arts and Culture: Boris Akunin (Writer)	Russia
2009	Japanese Language: Alliance of Associations of Teachers of Japanese (AATJ)	U.S.A.
2009	Japanese Studies and Intellectual Exchange: Arthur Stockwin (Former director of the Nissan Institute of Japanese Studies at the University of Oxford)	U.K.
2010	Arts and Culture: Tadao Sato (Film Critic)	Japan
2010	Japanese Language: Savitri Vishwanathan (Former Professor of Japanese Studies, University of Delhi)	India
2010	Japanese Studies and Intellectual Exchange: Ben-Ami Shillony (Professor Emeritus of Japanese Studies, The Hebrew University of Jerusalem)	Israel
2011	Arts and Culture: TAMBUCO Percussion Ensemble	Mexico
2011	Japanese Language: Department of Japanese and Japanese Literature, Faculty of Arts, Cairo University	Egypt
2011	Japanese Studies and Intellectual Exchange: Augustin Berque (Retired Professor, School of Advanced Studies in the Social Sciences)	France
2014	Charles David Allis	U.S.A.
2016	Cai Guo-Qiang	China
2017	Alexandra Munroe (Senior Curator, Asian Art, and Senior Advisor, Global Arts, Solomon R. Guggenheim Museum)	U.S.A.
2018	Spanish-Japanese Cultural Center of the University of Salamanca	Spain
2018	Yoko Tawada	Japan
2019	Shuntaro Tanikawa (Poet)	Japan
2019	Association of Indonesian Alumni From Japan (PERSADA)	Indonesia
2019	Ewa Pałasz-Rutkowska (Professor, University of Warsaw)	Poland
2021	Hirokazu KOREEDA (Fim Director)	Japan
2021	Mayumi Miyata (Shō (Japanese wind instrument) performer)	Japan
2021	Faculty of Japanese Language and Culture, University of Languages and International Studies – Vietnam National University, Hanoi (VNU) / Faculty of Japanese, Foreign Trade University / Department of Japanese Studies, Hanoi University	Vietnam
2021	Irmela Hijiya-Kirschnereit	Germany

=== Special Prizes ===
From 1974 to 2007, Special Prizes have been conferred, supplementing the list of those recognized by the Foundation.

Year	Recipients	Country
1974	Japan Center for International Exchange	Japan
1974	The Japanese Cultural Society, Singapore	Singapore
1975	The Asian Students Cultural Association	Japan
1975	The European Association for Japanese Studies	Europe
1975	The Maison Franco-Japonaise	Japan
1976	Deutsche Gesellschaft für Natur-und Völkerkunde Ostasiens in Tokyo	Germany
1976	The Fukuoka UNESCO Association	Japan
1977	The International Society for Educational Information	Japan
1977	Simul International, Inc.	Japan
1978	The Tokyo School of Japanese Language, The Institute for Research in Linguistic Culture	Japan
1978	The Kodokan	Japan
1979	The Australia, Japan and Western Pacific Economic Relations Research Committee, A.N.U.	Australia
1979	Ken Kurihara (Compilatory Staff, Diplomatic Record Office)	Japan
1980	Africa Society of Japan	Japan
1980	The Society for Teaching Japanese as a Foreign Language	Japan
1981	The Nihon Ki-in	Japan
1981	Publishers Association for Cultural Exchange, Japan	Japan
1982	The Asiatic Society of Japan in Tokyo	
1982	The Inter-University Center for Japanese Language Studies in Tokyo	
1983	The Asian Cultural Centre for UNESCO	Japan
1983	The International Students Institute	Japan
1984	AFS International / Intercultural Programs, Inc.	U.S.A.
1984	Kawakita Memorial Film Institute	Japan
1985	The International Education Center	Japan
1985	Japan-China Cultural Exchange Association	Japan
1986	Shotaro Iida (Associate Professor, University of British Columbia / Indian Studies, Buddhism)	Canada
1986	The Japan-Netherlands Institute	Japan
1987	Lokesh Chandra (Director, International Academy of Indian Culture / Buddhism)	India
1987	Josef Kreiner (Professor, Bonn University / Japanese Ethnology)	Austria
1988	Japanese Canadian Cultural Centre (Toronto)	Canada
1988	Jean-Jacques Origas (Professor, l'Institut National des Langues et Civilisations Orientales)	France
1989	Akio Hosono (Professor, The University of Tsukuba / Economics, Latin American Studies)	Japan
1989	Japan Association for Foreign Student Affairs	Japan
1990	The Indonesian Foundation for Intercultural Learning	Indonesia
1990	The University of Tokyo Press	Japan
1991	La Asociacion Argentino-Japonesa (Argentine-Japanese Association)	Argentine
1991	Japan Silver Volunteers, Inc.	Japan
1992	The Association for Japanese-Language Teaching	Japan
1992	Peter Kornicki (University Lecturer in Japanese, University of Cambridge) [U.K.] / Nozomu Hayashi (Associate Professor, Toyoko Gakuen Women's College / Japanese Literature)	Japan
1992	Yuriko Kuronuma (Violinist, President of Academia Yuriko Kuronuma)	Mexico
1993	Iwanami Hall	Japan
1993	Tatyana Lyvovna Sokolova-Delyusina (Translator, Member of the Moscow Literator Committee)	Russia
1994	Kodansha International Ltd.	Japan
1994	Phaisith Phipatanakul (Secretary General, National Assembly)	Thailand
1995	The Association for the Conservation of National Treasures	Japan
1995	Haji Abdul Razak Abdul Hamid (Head, Look East Policy Programme, Centre of Preparatory Education, MARA Institute of Technology)	Malaysia]
1996	Donald Keene Center of Japanese Culture, Columbia University	U.S.A.
1996	Midori Goto (Violinist / Founder and President of the Midori Foundation)	Japan / U.S.A.
1997	Centre of Japanese Art and Technology "Manggha" in Cracow	Poland
1997	Kai Nieminen (Translator of Japanese Literature, Japanologist, Writer)	Finland
1998	Thomas Erdos (Artistic Director, Theatre de la Ville)	France
1998	Pusan Korea-Japan Cultural Exchange Association	Korea
1998	Suntory Foundation	Japan
1999	Japanese American National Museum	U.S.A.
1999	Ahmet Mete Tuncoku (Professor, Middle East Technical University)	Turkey
1999	Tadashi Yamamoto (President, Japan Center for International Exchange)	Japan
2000	The Daido Life Foundation	Japan
2000	Tikotin Museum of Japanese Art, Haifa Museums	Israel
2000	Willy Freddy Vande Walle (Department Chair Section of Japanese Studies, Department of Oriental and Slavonic Studies, The Catholic University of Leuven)	Belgium
2001	Kosta Balabanov (President of the Society for Macedonian-Japanese Friendship and Cooperation, Honorary Consul-General of Japan in Skopje)	Macedonia
2001	The Berliner Festspiele	Germany
2001	Naoyuki Miura (President, Artistic Director of Music From Japan, Inc.)	Japan
2002	"Japanese Mothers for Foreign Students" Movement of the Tokyo YWCA	Japan
2002	The Old Japan Students' Association, Thailand (OJSAT)	Thailand
2002	Warsaw University, Oriental Studies Institute, Department of Japanese and Korean Studies	Poland
2003	Far Eastern National University, Institute of Oriental Studies	Russia
2003	Mikio Kato (Trustee and Executive Director, International House of Japan)	Japan
2003	Turkish Japanese Foundation	Turkey
2004	James Quandt (Senior Programmer, Cinematheque Ontario)	Canada
2004	Kurayoshi Takara (Professor, Faculty of Law and Letters, the University of the Ryukyus)	Japan
2004	Dok Bong Yi (Professor, Division of Foreign Languages, Dongduk Women's University)	Korea
2005	China Japanese Educational Association	China
2005	Tabassum Kashmiri (Former Foreign Instructor, Osaka University of Foreign Studies)	Pakistan
2005	Philippine Educational Theater Association	Philippines
2006	Yongdeok Kim (Dean, Graduate School of International Studies, Seoul National University)	Korea
2006	Saint-Petersburg State University, Faculty of Asian and African Studies	Russia
2006	Yamagata International Documentary Film Festival Organizing Committee	Japan
2007	Ayse Selçuk Esenbel (Professor, Boğaziçi University)	Turkey
2007	Levy Hideo (Novelist; Professor, Hosei University)	U.S.A.
2007	Fram Kitagawa (Art Director; Chairman, Art Forum Gallery Co.)	Japan
