= Irmela Hijiya-Kirschnereit =

German Japanologist and translator

Irmela Hijiya-Kirschnereit (born 20 August 1948 in Korntal) is a German Japanologist and translator. In 1992 she was awarded Germany's most prestigious prize for distinction in research, the Gottfried Wilhelm Leibniz Prize.

== Life ==
From 1967 to 1969 she studied Japanology, Sinology, Philosophy and Sociology at Hamburg University. She then studied at the Ruhr University in Bochum (1969-1970), and in the same year took up a scholarship to study at Waseda University (1970–1972) and Tokyo University. On her return, she completed her doctorate (1972–1975) summa cum laude at the Department of Oriental Studies of the Ruhr University in Bochum, combining Japanology, German Studies and the Communication Science. After a further year of specialization in Germanic and Comparative Literature, she taught at the same faculty (1977–1985). In 1980, she obtained her postdoctoral qualification for teaching, and joined the German Research Foundation under a five-year grant with the Heisenberg Programme.

On the expiry of her grant, she obtained an appointment as extraordinary Professor in the Department of Social Sciences at Hitotsubashi University in Tokyo, where she taught courses on both Japanese Literature and the sociology of literature. In 1986 she was appointed to the newly established chair of Japanology at the University of Trier. In 1991 she was called to a professorial position at the Free University of Berlin, where she has been active down to the present day.

In 1993, Irmela Hijiya-Kirschnereit became a founding member of the Berlin-Brandenburg Academy of Sciences and Humanities, received the Federal Cross of Merit of Germany in 1995 and was Director of the German Institute for Japanese Studies in Tokyo from 1996 to 2004. For her services in promoting mutual understanding between German and Japanese culture she was awarded the Eugen and Ilse Seibold Prize in 2001. She also served as president of the European Association for Japanese Studies (1994 -1997).

She is also general editor of both the Japanese Library series published by Insel Verlag (Japanische Bibliothek) with 32 volumes published (1993-2000) and of the Iaponia Insula series published by Iudicium (15 volumes) dedicated to studies on Japanese culture and society. She is also on the editorial board of Monumenta Nipponica and the Japan Forum, the journal of the British Association for Japanese Studies.

When not professionally engaged, she pursues a very active interest in the culinary arts.

== Publications ==
- Selbstentblößungsrituale: Zur Theorie und Geschichte der autobiographischen Gattung Shishosetsu in der modernen japanischen Literatur, Otto Harrowitz, Wiesbaden 1981. (2nd.rev.ed.2005)
- Das Ende der Exotik Suhrkamp, Frankfurt am Main, 1988
- Was heißt: Japanische Literatur verstehen? Suhrkamp, Frankfurt am Main, 1990
- Rituals of self-revelation: Shishosetsu as literary genre and socio-cultural phenomenonHarvard Univ. Press, Cambridge, Massachusetts. 1996 (tr. of 1981)
- Überwindung der Moderne? Suhrkamp, Frankfurt am Main, 1996.
- Kulturbeziehungen zwischen Japan und dem Westen seit 1853 Iudicium, Munich, 1999
- Forschen und Fördern im Zeichen des Ginkgo Iudicium, Munich, 1999
- Canon and identity DIJ, Berlin, 2000
- Japanische Gegenwartsliteratur, Ed. Text und Kritik, Munich, 2000
- Japan , Insel, Frankfurt am Main, 2000 .
- Eine gewisse Farbe der Fremdheit , Iudicium, Munich, 2001
- Selbstentblößungsrituale zur Theorie und Geschichte der autobiographischen Gattung ”Shishosetsu” in der modernen japanischen Literatur, 2nd ed. Iudicium Munich, 2005

== Translations ==
Inoue Yasushi Der Fälscher, Insel, Frankfurt am Main 1999 (= Aru gisakka no shōgai 1951)
