= Kreiner =

Kreiner is a surname. Notable people with the surname include:

- David Kreiner (born 1981), Austrian Nordic combined skier
- Josef Kreiner (born 1940), Austrian Japanology ethnologist
- Kathy Kreiner (born 1957), Canadian alpine skier
- Kim Kreiner (born 1977), American javelin thrower
- Laurie Kreiner (born 1954), Canadian alpine skier
- Marion Kreiner (born 1981), Austrian snowboarder
- Stefan Kreiner (born 1973), Austrian Nordic combined skier
- Tamás Kreiner, Hungarian composer

Fictional characters:

- Fitz Kreiner, character in the Doctor Who novel series Eighth Doctor Adventures
