= Alexander Slawik =

Austrian Nazi sociological scientist and ethnologist

- Born: 27 December 1900; Austria Budweis
- Died: 19 April 1997 (aged 96); Vienna
- Occupations: sociological scientist, ethnologist

Alexander Slawik (27 December 1900 – 19 April 1997) was a sociological scientist, ethnologist, Nazi and professor in Vienna, who also worked on cultural themes. He was a pioneer of Japanology and Japanese ethnological studies in Vienna in the 1930's. During the Second World War, Slawik worked as a cryptographer and translator on the Japanese desk of the Cipher Department of the High Command of the Wehrmacht. He continued to work in his old age, and, up until his death, was working on collecting material for a work on the Susanoo-no-Mikoto and the cultural history of the Izumo area in ancient Japan.

== Life ==
Alexander Slawik was the son of an Imperial and Royal (German: kaiserlich und königlich) (Abbr. KuK) officer family who was part of the Austria-Hungary monarchy and grew up in Kraków, where his father was commander of the city. Through conversations with his father, Slawik became interested in Japan and the Japanese language. His father was interested in the Russo-Japanese War and had made significant contributions to the corpus. His father purchased a course in the Chinese language for Slawik which was his first introduction to grammar. While attending secondary school in Krems an der Donau, he began the study of Japanese, through an extensive study of Kojiki that describes the mythical origins of Japan and the classical Japanese history book, Nihon Shoki.

As an 18-year-old, he found himself destitute and penniless in Vienna after the end of the war in 1918 and a failed apprenticeship as a metalworker. He then began to study law in order to make a living, but when he failed his staatsexamen, (state exams) he was only too happy to give up this career in favour of East Asian studies. He earned his livelihood at this time as a commercial employee, working as a clerk at Siemens-Schuckert (1924–31).

Through his contacts with the small Japanese community in Vienna he remained in contact with the field. Slawik came into contact with the Austrian diplomat, former imperial envoy in Beijing and sinologist Arthur von Rosthorn, who would later become a mentor. Through discussions with Rosthorn, Slawik formulated a dissertation through the study of early contacts between Japan, Korea and China during the Han dynasty. However, Slawik was informed by the deans office that the University of Vienna, where his mentor Rosthorn held an honorary professor, that it was not possible to obtain a doctorate, since at that time the disciplines of sinology and Japanology did not yet exist in Vienna. Through his Vienna circle, he met the poet, neurologist and psychiatrist Mokichi Saitō where the discussed Tanka stories and the ethnologist Masao Oka (岡正雄) who would have a profound effect on Salwik. In 1931, he returned to study with a focus on Japanese ethnogenesis, where he was promoted to Dr. Phil with a thesis called: Cultural strata in Old Korea (German:Kulturschichten in Alt-Korea)

== Career ==
In 1937, a planned appointment to the Fujian University of the SVD Order, which later became the Fujian Normal University in Beijing was prevented by the outbreak of the Second Sino-Japanese War in East Asia. He then taught as a lecturer for Japanese language at the Consular Academy in Vienna, later also at the University of Vienna. At that time he was already engaged in the underground for the Nazi Party, which would later lead to his dismissal from state civil service in 1945.

Together with the cultural anthropologist Oka Masao, he established an institute of learning at the University of Vienna, known as the Japan Institute (Institut für Japankunde). This institute was donated by Baron Mitsui Takaharu (高原 高原) in 1938. Masao became the chair of the Institute for Japanese Studies which began to take students in April 1939, while Slawik became his assistant.

When World War II began, he was conscripted into the Wehrmacht.

Through his efforts to preserve the Japan Institute and particularly its library, he gained the trust of the anthropologist, Professor Wilhelm Koppers, who was director of the Institute of Ethnology at the University of Vienna. Starting from 1948 he was appointed as an assistant Professor, then assistant to Koppers, particularly with the establishment of the library at the university. He later became the head of a Japan department. From 1964 he was promoted to Professor extraordinarius, within the Institute of Ethnology, which was transferred to an independent institute for Japanese studies in 1965. He was the director until his retirement in 1971.

For the first time, he visited Japan, with the support of UNESCO (Paris) during 1957-58. During the stay, he undertook field studies at the Ainu and in Kyushu villages (Kyushu). The collected Ainu of the Saru Valley cult objects are an important part of the collection of the Museum of Ethnology, Vienna.

At the invitation of the Japanese Foreign Ministry in 1966, he researched the Fukuoka area. During 1968-69, further work on Hokkaido and Kyushu laid the cornerstone of the interdisciplinary project, developed and managed by him, whose aim was the comprehensive recording of the culture of a historically comprehensible space. The result of this long-standing project, a documentation on the topography, social and economic history, the rural equipment inventory as well as the situation of the Burakumin in the Aso basin (Asō Bay), was published in three volumes.

Among the pupils of Slawik, who made a name for themselves in Japanese studies in the "Wiener Schule", were Josef Kreiner, Peter Pantzer and Sepp Linhart.

When Slawik retired, he spent his life in a Viennese retirement home. When he died, he was buried at the Vienna Central Cemetery.

== War work ==
During the Second World War, Dr Slawik, along with Dr Wolfgang Schmal, ran the Japanese desk of the language department of Cipher Department of the High Command of the Wehrmacht as he was the most experienced individual with Second Lieutenant (German: Leutnant) Dr Walter Adler in command. Little is known of Wolfgang Schmal or Walter Adler.

== Awards ==
- Order of the Sacred Treasure 3rd class in 1966
- Order of the Sacred Treasure 2nd class with Star, Gold and Silver Rays in 1987
- Prize of the Japan Foundation 1989
- Honorary Cross for Science and Art 1st Class
- Gold decoration for services to the state of Vienna

== See also ==
- History of Japan
