= Eremocharis =

Eremocharis may refer to:

- Eremocharis (grasshopper), a genus of grasshoppers in the family Pamphagidae
- Eremocharis (plant), a genus of plants in the family Apiaceae
