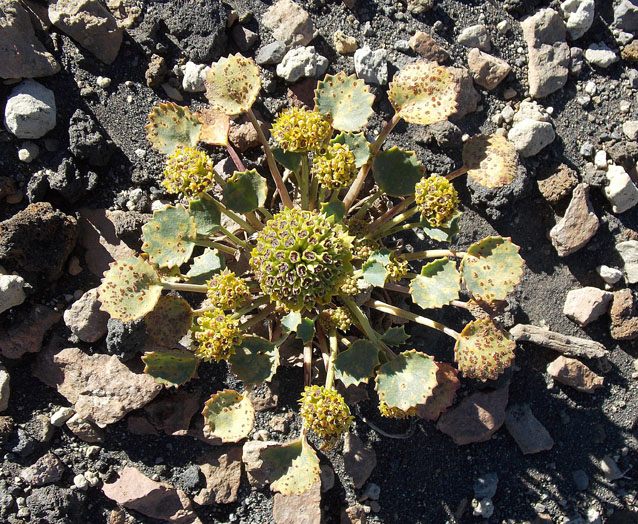

Scientific classification
- Kingdom: Plantae
- Clade: Tracheophytes
- Clade: Angiosperms
- Clade: Eudicots
- Clade: Asterids
- Order: Apiales
- Family: Apiaceae
- Subfamily: Azorelloideae; G.M.Plunkett & Lowry

= Azorelloideae =

Subfamily of plants

Azorelloideae is a subfamily in the family Apiaceae. It has been estimated it originated from South America.

== Genera ==
- Asteriscium
- Azorella
- Bolax
- Bowlesia
- Dichosciadium
- Dickinsia
- Diplaspis
- Diposis
- Domeykoa
- Drusa
- Eremocharis
- Gymnophyton
- Homalocarpus
- Oschatzia
- Pozoa
- Spananthe
