= Peter Kornicki =

English Japanologist

Peter Francis Kornicki
- Born: 1 May 1950 (age 76); Maidenhead, England
- Education: Lincoln College, Oxford; St Antony's College, Oxford
- Occupations: Japanologist, academic, writer
- Employer: University of Cambridge
- Known for: Studies of Japanese book history and languages in Asia
- Title: Emeritus Professor of Japanese
- Spouse: Francesca Orsini (m. 1998)
- Children: 2
- Awards: Order of the Rising Sun, Japan Foundation Award, Yamagata Bantō Prize

Peter Francis Kornicki (born 1 May 1950) FBA is an English Japanologist. He is Emeritus Professor of Japanese at Cambridge University and Emeritus Fellow of Robinson College, Cambridge. He is particularly known for his studies of the history of the book and of languages in Asia. In 2018, Kornicki was awarded the Order of the Rising Sun 3rd Class, Gold Rays with Neck Ribbon in recognition of his outstanding contribution to the promotion of Japanese Studies in the UK and thus to deeper mutual understanding between Japan and the United Kingdom.

== Life and career ==
Kornicki was born at Maidenhead on 1 May 1950, the eldest son of Sq/Ldr Franciszek Kornicki and Patience Ceredwin Kornicka (née Williams). He went to schools in Malta, Aden and Cyprus and was then educated at St George's College, Weybridge.

He matriculated at Lincoln College, Oxford, initially to read Classics. He graduated with First Class Honours in Japanese with Korean in 1972. He spent the academic year 1972-3 as a Japanese Ministry of Education foreign student at Tokyo University of Education (now Tsukuba University) and then returned to Oxford and in 1975 received an MSc in Applied Social Studies. He then moved to St Antony's College, Oxford to begin work on a DPhil on Japanese literature of the Meiji period.

In 1976 he was awarded a Japan Foundation fellowship for study in Japan and spent 18 months at the Research Institute for the Humanities at Kyoto University, studying under Professors Asukai Masamichi and Yoshida Mitsukuni. He taught Japanese at the University of Tasmania from 1978 to 1982, and was subsequently an associate professor at the Research Institute for the Humanities at Kyoto University.

In 1985 he came to Cambridge, where he has been a fellow of Robinson College since 1986, and was Deputy Warden from 2008 to 2018. He was President of the European Association for Japanese Studies (EAJS) in 1997-2000. In 2007-2008 he held the Sandars Readership in Bibliography at Cambridge University.

His main research interest is in the history of the book in Japan, but he is also interested in the lives and work of the British pioneer japanologists Frederick Victor Dickins, William George Aston, Ernest Mason Satow and Basil Hall Chamberlain.

== Personal life ==
In 1975, Kornicki married Catharine Olga Mikolaski. Together they had two children: one daughter and one son. His first wife died in 1995. In 1998, he married Francesca Orsini, an Italian scholar of South Asian literature.

== Honours ==
- Japan Foundation Award, 1992.
- British Academy, Fellow (FBA), 2000.
- Lincoln College, Oxford, Honorary Fellow, 2004.
- Yamagata Bantō Prize, Osaka Prefecture, 2013

== Works ==
=== Books ===
- The Book in Japan: A Cultural History from the Beginnings to the Nineteenth Century, Leiden: Brill, 1998. Paperback, University of Hawaii Press, 2000. ISBN 978-0-8248-2337-5
- Early Japanese Books in Cambridge University Library: A Catalogue of the Aston, Satow and von Siebold Collections, with N. Hayashi (Cambridge University Press), pp. xx + 520, 1991 ISBN 978-0-521-36496-6
- Kornicki, Peter F. (2018). Languages, Scripts, and Chinese Texts in East Asia. Oxford: Oxford University Press. ISBN 0198797826.
- The Cambridge Encyclopedia of Japan, coedited with Richard Bowring (Cambridge University Press), pp. 400, 1993 ISBN 978-0-521-40352-8
- Captain Oswald Tuck and the Bedford Japanese School, 1942-1945, London: Pollino Publishing, 2019. xxiv, 115 pages ISBN 9781526207852
- Eavesdropping on the Emperor: Interrogators and Codebreakers in Britain’s War with Japan, Oxford, New York: Oxford University Press, 2021. xxx, 402, [44] pages. ISBN 9780197602805

=== Articles and lectures ===
- "Having Difficulty with Chinese? - The Rise of the Vernacular Book in Japan, Korea and Vietnam." Sandars Lectures, 2008.
