= Charles Dunn (Japanologist) =

British Japanologist

Charles J. Dunn (June 24, 1915 – July 30, 1995) was a British Japanologist who played a critical role in establishing the field of Japanese studies within the United Kingdom. In 1982 he was awarded the Order of the Rising Sun by Japanese Emperor Hirohito.

== Life and career ==
Born in 1915, Dunn was educated at Queen Mary University of London where he earned a BA in French literature in 1936. He then worked for three years with the Special Branch of the Metropolitan Police and as a school teacher before joining the Royal Navy in 1943. Because of his background in foreign languages, the War Office assigned him to become a military translator and sent him to learn Japanese in an 18-month course at the SOAS University of London. Displaying a gift both for Japanese and teaching, he was permanently assigned to the SOAS University of London as a lecturer to military translators in training for the remainder of the war.

After the war, Dunn continued as lecturer at the SOAS; beginning with undergraduate courses in modern Japanese in 1947. He remained there until his retirement in 1982; having achieved the position of professor in 1970. In 1966, he published both the book Everyday Life in Traditional Japan, and his doctoral dissertation on Japanese theatre. He served terms as president of the British Association for Japanese Studies and president of the European Association for Japanese Studies. He was awarded the Order of the Rising Sun in 1982 by Japanese Emperor Hirohito. He died in 1995 at the age of 80.
