= Josef Kreiner =

Professor Josef Kreiner
- Born: 15 March 1940; Vienna, Austria
- Citizenship: Austrian
- Education: University of Vienna
- Scientific career
- Fields: Japanology ethnology
- Workplaces: University of Bonn; University of Tokyo
- Doctoral advisor: Alexander Slawik

Josef Kreiner (15 March 1940 in Vienna) is an Austrian Japanology ethnologist who held the positions of Professor of Japanese studies at the University of Bonn and Director of the Japanological Seminar of the University of Bonn from 1977 until his retirement in 2008.

== Life ==
Josef Kreiner was the son of Anton and Anna Kreiner. Kreiner studied the ethnology of Japan, its people and its prehistory at the University of Vienna and University of Tokyo. He was promoted in 1964 to Dr Phil at the University of Vienna. After two years, as a lecturer at the Institute of Japanese Studies, Kreiner habilitated in Japanology in Vienna, under Alexander Slawik. From 1969 - 1971 Kreiner spent his time at the University of Bonn as a lecturer before taking the venia legendi at Bonn in 1970. He was sub subsequently promoted to Professor of Japanese Studies in Vienna, and between 1971 and 1977 Kreiner was Director of the Institute of Japanese Studies. From 1975 to 1979, Kreiner was President of the European Association for Japanese Studies. From 1977 to 2008 Kreiner was Professor of Japanese Studies at the University of Bonn.

== Work ==
Kreiner is a pioneer of ethnological Japanese research and a specialist for Okinawa and the Ainu. Kreiner was a co-founder of the European Association for Japanese Studies and was later president between 1973-1980. He was the first director of the German Institute for Japanese Studies and was later founder of the Philipp-Franz von Siebold Foundation. It was named in honour of Philipp Franz von Siebold, German physician, botanist, who achieved prominence by his studies of Japanese flora and fauna and the introduction of Western medicine in Japan. In 2013, well after his retirement, Kreiner worked as a visiting Fellow for special tasks at the Hōsei University to supervise, among others, the newly founded International Association of Ryukyuan and Okinawan Studies. In 2015, he was a visiting scholar at the Tokyo National Museum.

In 2015 an award was created called the Josef Kreiner Hosei University Award for International Japanese Studies by Hosei University Research Center for International Japanese Studies staff to honour Josef Kreiner for his efforts to promote Japanese studies in Europe.

== Societies ==
- 2008 Kreiner was elected as an honorary member to the European Association for Japanese Studies.
- 1991 Member of the Academia Europaea.
- 1980 Corresponding member of the Austrian Academy of Sciences
- 1997 Corresponding member of the North Rhine-Westphalian Academy of Sciences, Humanities and the Arts.

== Awards and honours ==
- 2008 Order of the Rising Sun, with golden rays
- 2005 Eugen and Ilse Seibold Prize of the Deutsche Forschungsgemeinschaft
- 1995 Higa Shunchô prize of the Society for Cultural Research Okinawa
- 1987 Special prize of the Japan Foundation
- 1996 Yamagata Bantō prize of Ôsaka Prefecture
- 1996 Federal cross of merit 1st class

== Bibliography ==
The following are the books authored, co-authored, or edited by Kreiner.

- Kreiner, Josef; Ölschleger, Hans-Dieter; Möhwald, Ulrich (2004). Modern Japanese society, Series: Handbuch der Orientalistik, 5, Japan, 9. Leiden: Brill. ISBN 9789004105164.
- Kreiner, Josef (1996). The impact of traditional thought on present-day Japan., Series: Monographien aus dem Deutschen Institut für Japanstudien der Philipp-Franz-von-Siebold-Stiftung, 11. München: Iudicium. ISBN 9783891294918.
- Kreiner, Josef (1995). Japan in global context : papers presented on the occasion of the fifth anniversary of the German Institute for Japanese Studies, Tōkyō., Series:Deutsches Institut für Japanstudien <Tōkyō>., Monographien aus dem Deutschen Institut für Japanstudien der Philipp-Franz-von-Siebold-Stiftung. München: Iudicium-Verl. ISBN 9783891294901.
- Kreiner, Josef (1993). European studies on Ainu language and culture. Munchen: Iudicium. ISBN 9783891294864.
- Kreiner, Josef; Ölschleger, Hans-Dieter (2008). Theories and methods in Japanese studies: current state and future developments : papers in honor of Josef Kreiner. Göttingen: Vandenhoeck & Ruprecht Unipress:Bonn University Press. ISBN 978-3899713558.
- Kreiner, Josef (2006). Japaneseness versus Ryūkyūanism papers read at the Fourth International Conference on Okinawan Studies, Bonn Venue, March 2002. Bonn: Bonn Bier. ISBN 9783936366198.
- Kreiner, Josef (2016). Japanese collections in European museums, With special reference to Buddhist art. Bonn Bier'sche Verlagsanstalt. ISBN 9783936366556.
- Kreiner, Josef; zaidan, Toyota (2005). Irene, Tomoe; Steineck, Maria; Kreiner, Josef; Steineck, Raji C. (eds.). Reports from the Toyota Foundation symposium, Königswinter 2003 general prospects. Bonn: Bier’sche Verlagsanstalt. ISBN 9783936366068.
- Kreiner, Josef (1956). Japan und die Mittelmächte im Ersten Weltkrieg und in den zwanziger Jahren., Series:Studium Universale, Bd. 8. Bonn: Bouvier. ISBN 9783416040082.
