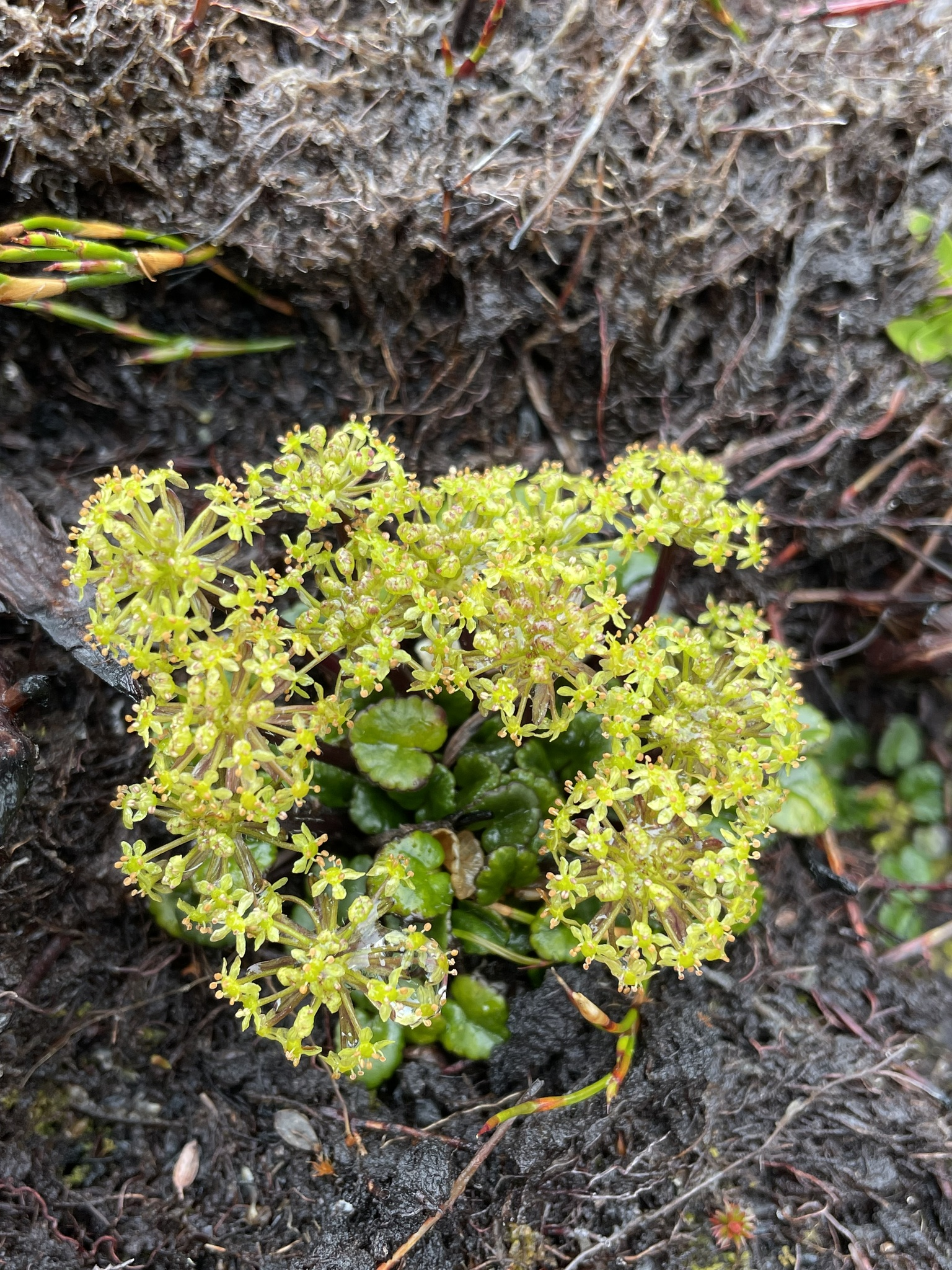

Scientific classification
- Kingdom: Plantae
- Clade: Tracheophytes
- Clade: Angiosperms
- Clade: Eudicots
- Clade: Asterids
- Order: Apiales
- Family: Apiaceae
- Genus: Diplaspis
- Species: D. cordifolia

Binomial name
- Diplaspis cordifolia (Hook.) Hook.f.
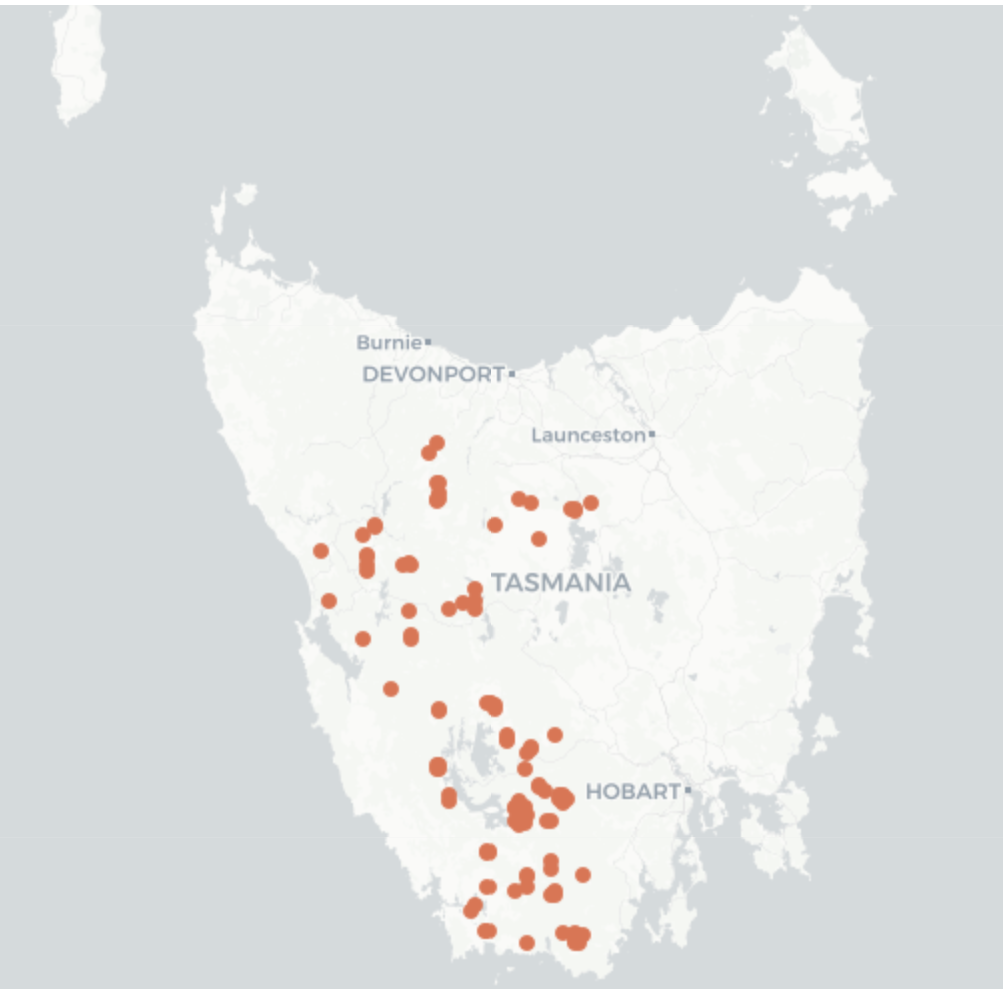
- Distribution of Displaspis cordifolia from the Atlas of Living Australia

= Diplaspis cordifolia =

Species of flowering plant

Diplaspis cordifolia is an endemic Tasmanian herb, known commonly as western mountain-pennywort. It is found in alpine vegetation communities across Tasmania, most commonly in the West and South-western areas.

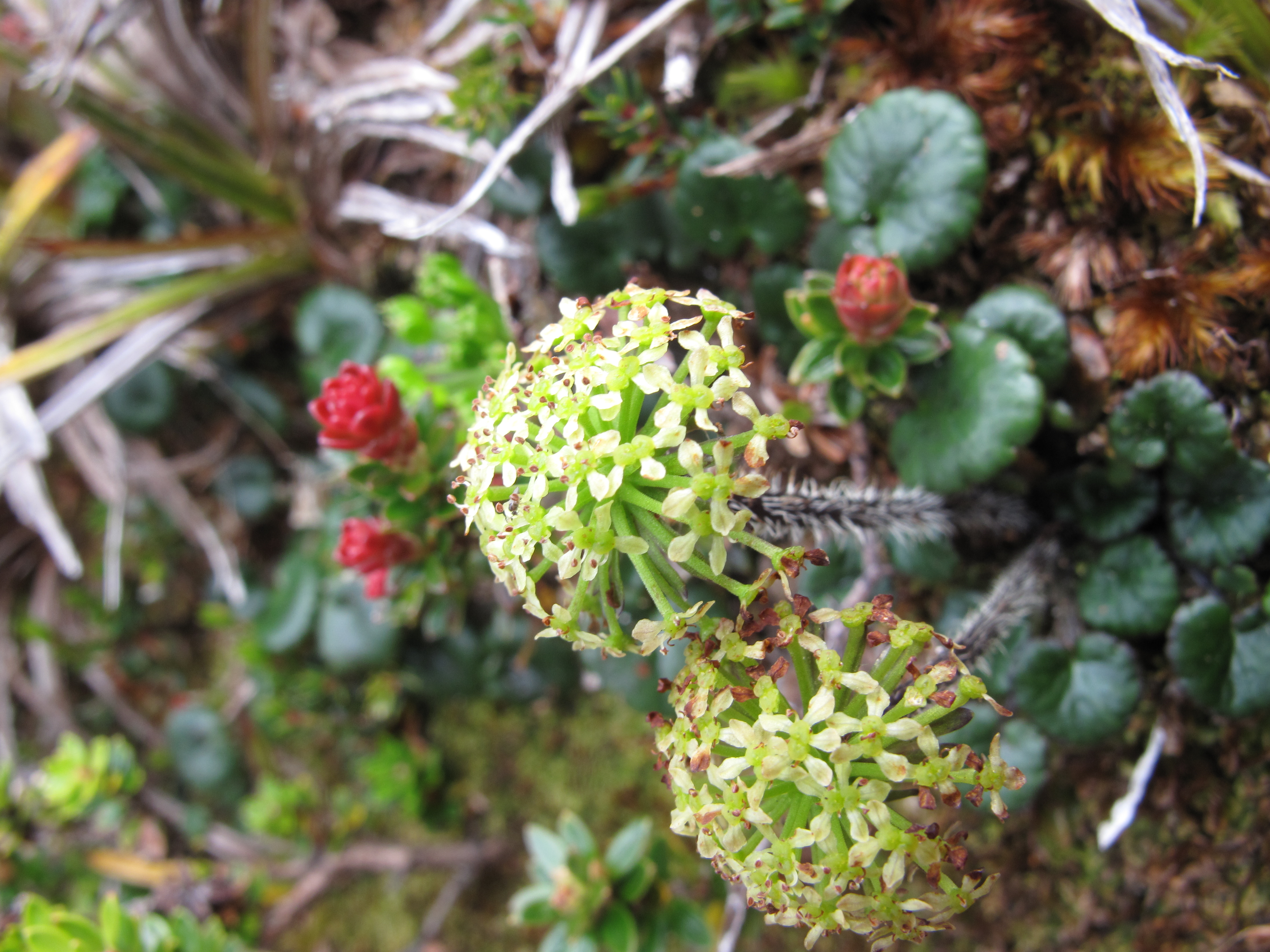
Diplaspis cordifolia hiding in an alpine rock crevice

== History ==
Diplaspis cordifolia was first named by Joseph Dalton Hooker in 1856, in Hooker's journal The botany of the Antarctic voyage of H.M Discovery ships Erebus and Terror. III. Flora Tasmaniae 1(2). Diplaspis cordifolia is one of three members of the Diplaspis genus with two other species: Diplaspis hydrocotyle and Diplaspis nivis.

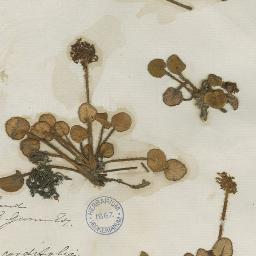
A specimen of Diplaspis cordifolia from Kew's herbarium

== Description ==
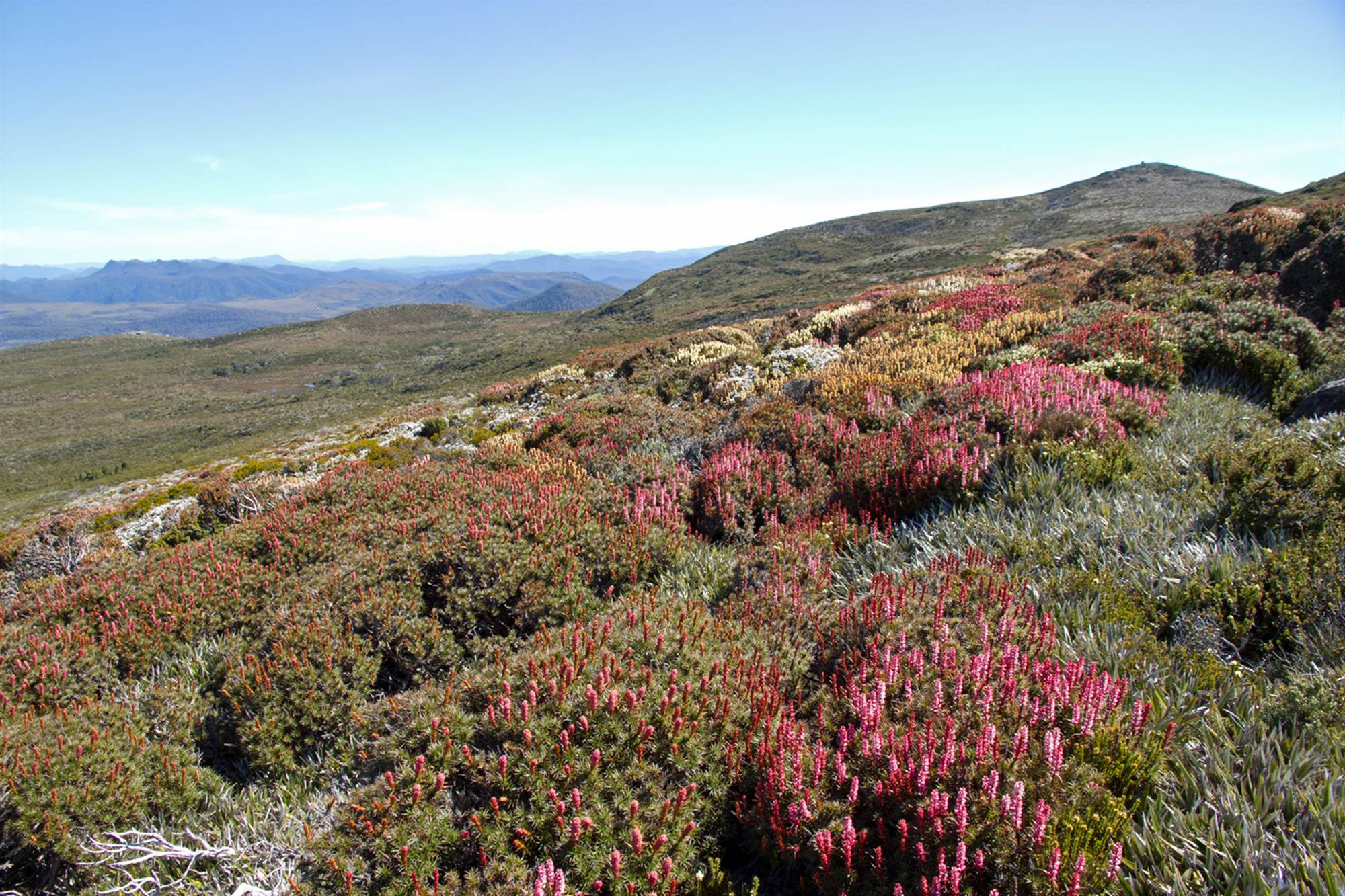
An example of a Tasmanian alpine vegetation community, where Diplaspis cordifolia individuals would likely be present

Diplaspis cordifolia is a perennial herb with creeping rhizomes. The species grows between 2–13 cm (0.79–5.12 in) high, with petioles pilose or on rare occasions glabrous. Its leaves range in size from 0.7–1.5 cm (0.28–0.59 in), and are small and orbicular with crenulate margins.

It has a dark green rosette, and over 20 flowers per umbel. The flower petals are 1–1.5 mm (0.039–0.059 in) long and 0.7–0.9 mm (0.028–0.035 in) wide in bisexual flowers, or 1.3–1.7 mm (0.051–0.067 in) long and 0.7–1 mm (0.028–0.039 in) wide in male flowers.

A thick stalk of a few centimetres long holds the flowers and fruit. The fruit is 2.5–3.4 mm (0.098–0.134 in) long, 1.3–1.5 mm (0.051–0.059 in) wide and 1.4–2.5 mm (0.055–0.098 in) deep, and flushed with purple in colour.

== Differentiation ==
The easiest way to first identify which member of Diplaspis is being identified is based on location. Diplaspis nivis is not present in Tasmania, therefore only Diplaspis cordifolia and Diplaspis hydrocotyle are found in Tasmania. Another identifying character is Diplaspis nivis does not have crenate margins.

In order to separate Diplaspis cordifolia from Diplaspis hydrocotyle, one must look at the flowers and leaf margins. Diplaspis cordifolia is androdioecious, with its margin lobes overlapping and leaf margins recurving at the hydathodes, whereas Diplaspis hydrocotyle only has bisexual flowers and has no overlapping present in their lamina lobes. The styles and stylopodium of Diplaspis cordifolia are also significantly longer than that of Diplaspis hydrocotyle, making up a 1/3 of the total fruit length.

== Habitat and distribution ==
Diplaspis cordifolia is endemic to the Australian island state of Tasmania. It is considered to be part of a community of high-alpine plants and has been reported to be found at altitudes ranging from 800 to 1,400 m (2,600 to 4,600 ft) above sea level. It is found in crevices and between rocks, and prefers peaty soils, which are high in nutrients.

Within alpine areas, it has been recorded in coniferous heath vegetation, bolster heath vegetation, heath vegetation, bog vegetation and short alpine herb field vegetation. Diplaspis cordifolia can be found at locations in Tasmania such as: Cradle Mountain, Mt Field, and the Southwest National Park. Tasmanian alpine environments are dominated by hardy shrubs and sedges, and their soils are largely composed of shallow layers of peat.

== Conservation status and threats ==
The conservation status of Diplaspis cordifolia is currently unknown, as it is not listed under the International Union for Conservation of Nature's Red List of Threatened Species. However this does not mean that Diplaspis cordifolia is not at risk, as the impacts of issues such as climate change and population growth continue to worsen over time. As bushfires increase in frequency and intensity, alpine plants such as Diplaspis cordifolia, will no longer be able to persist in their usual habitats. Other threats include damage to the physical structure of the plants themselves which can prevent them from growing and reproducing successfully. A large number of Tasmanian hiking trails are located in alpine areas Diplaspis cordifolia is present in, such as Mt Field National Park and Southwest National Park. As tourist numbers along the trails rise, the risk of Diplaspis cordifolia being trampled increases as well.

== Synonyms ==
Diplaspis cordifolia has also been known/recorded under the following synonyms:

- Pozopsis cordifolia Hook.
- Pozoopsis cordifolia Benth.
- Huanaca cordifolia (Hook.) F.Muell
- Huacana cordifolia A.D.Chapm.
