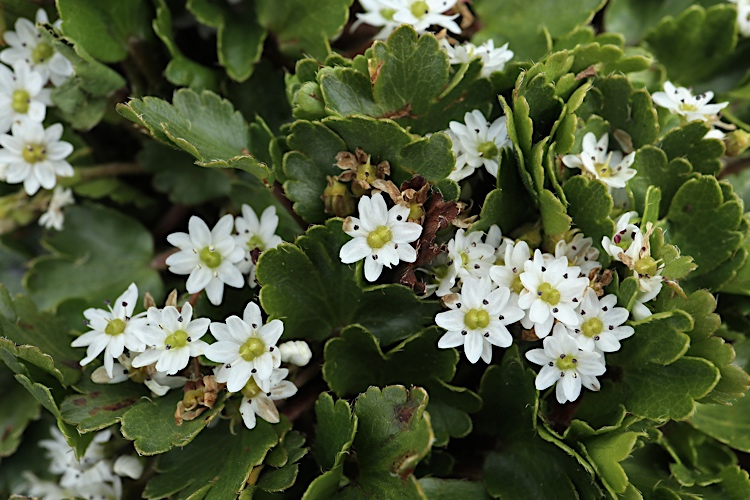

Scientific classification
- Kingdom: Plantae
- Clade: Embryophytes
- Clade: Tracheophytes
- Clade: Spermatophytes
- Clade: Angiosperms
- Clade: Eudicots
- Clade: Asterids
- Order: Apiales
- Family: Apiaceae
- Genus: Dichosciadium; Domin
- Species: D. ranunculaceum

Binomial name
- Dichosciadium ranunculaceum (F.Muell.) Domin

= Dichosciadium =

Genus of plants

Dichosciadium ranunculaceum is a species of flowering plant belonging to the family Apiaceae, and the sole species in genus Dichosciadium. It is a small, flat perennial herb that can grow up to 20 cm wide. The species is native to southeastern Australia, and is commonly referred to as Wreath Pennywort.

== Description ==
Dichosciadium ranunculaceum are herbs with a basal rosette up to 10–20 cm in diameter and is commonly found in big patches within herb fields, bogs, and damp areas. They are formed from branching taproots, with a parsnip smell when fresh. Dichosciadium ranunculaceum has many dark green, hairy, and glossy leaves, making it a distinguishing factor from other neighbouring herbs. Its leaves are a circular to ovate shape ~11-24mm long and ~12-24mm in diameter. Each leaf has a 3-7 lobe that is irregular along a crenate margined leaf. Dichosciadium ranunculaceum has a broad-cuneate or rounded base and its petiole is ~2–7 cm long.

Dichosciadium ranunculaceum has 3-7 flowers in each umbel, a hispid peduncle ~3–5 cm long, and narrow-oblong bracts ~11mm long. It has white flowers, that blooms in January to February, with 5 petals and 5 sepals ~5-10mm in diameter, as well as a green pistil and, 5 purple mericarps. Each fruit is elliptic ~2.5–7 mm long and mericarps with outer faces flattened.

== Habitat & Distribution ==
Dichosciadium ranunculaceum is native alpine herb only found throughout south-east Australia from Mount Kosciuszko to the mountains in western Tasmania. It has a life span of at least 3 years that returns to grow yearly when the ideal climate condition starts. Dichosciadium ranunculaceum is commonly found at an elevation of 1800-2200m above sea level.

== History and phylogenetic relationships ==
The Azorella clade is a sister group to Bowlesia. Dichosciadium ranunculaceum had to be placed in the Azorella clade due to the lack in hollow fruits commonly found in the subtribe Bowlesiinae. Plants in the Azorella clade has mat-forming habits similar to Dichosciadium ranunculaceum. They exhibit an intricate pattern of relationships in the plastid phylogeny. All species within the Azorelloideae subfamily is grouped based on the presence of a woody endocarp, the absence of vittae, and distinct oil ducts. They consist of plants across Australia and South America. The name Dichosciadium ranunculaceum comes from rānunculus which is Latin for little frog. It refers to plants preferring marsh habitats, similar to a frog’s habitat.
