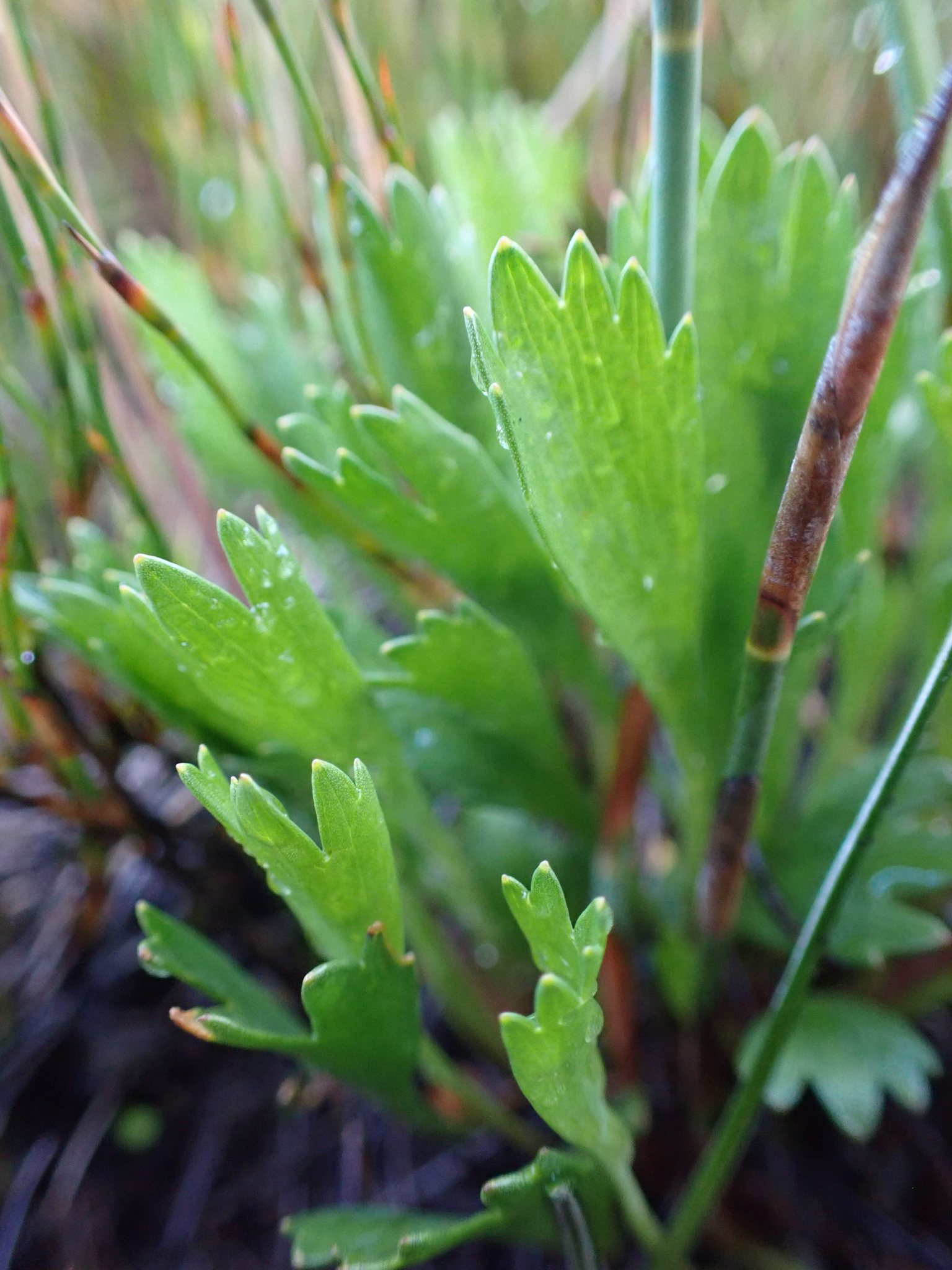
- Oschatzia cuneifolia

Scientific classification
- Kingdom: Plantae
- Clade: Tracheophytes
- Clade: Angiosperms
- Clade: Eudicots
- Clade: Asterids
- Order: Apiales
- Family: Apiaceae
- Subfamily: Azorelloideae
- Genus: Oschatzia; Walp.

Synonyms
- Microsciadium Hook.f.

= Oschatzia =

Genus of flowering plant

Oschatzia is a genus of flowering plants belonging to the family Apiaceae. It is also in the subfamily of Azorelloideae.

Its native range is south-eastern Australia, it is found in the states of New South Wales, Tasmania and Victoria.

The genus name of Oschatzia is in honour of Adolph Oschatz (1812–1857), and German doctor and botanist.He was also an inventor of microtomy. It was first described and published in Ann. Bot. Syst. Vol.1 on page 340 in 1848.

== Species ==
The following species are recognised in the genus Oschatzia:

- Oschatzia cuneifolia (F.Muell.) Drude
- Oschatzia saxifraga (Hook.f.) Walp.
