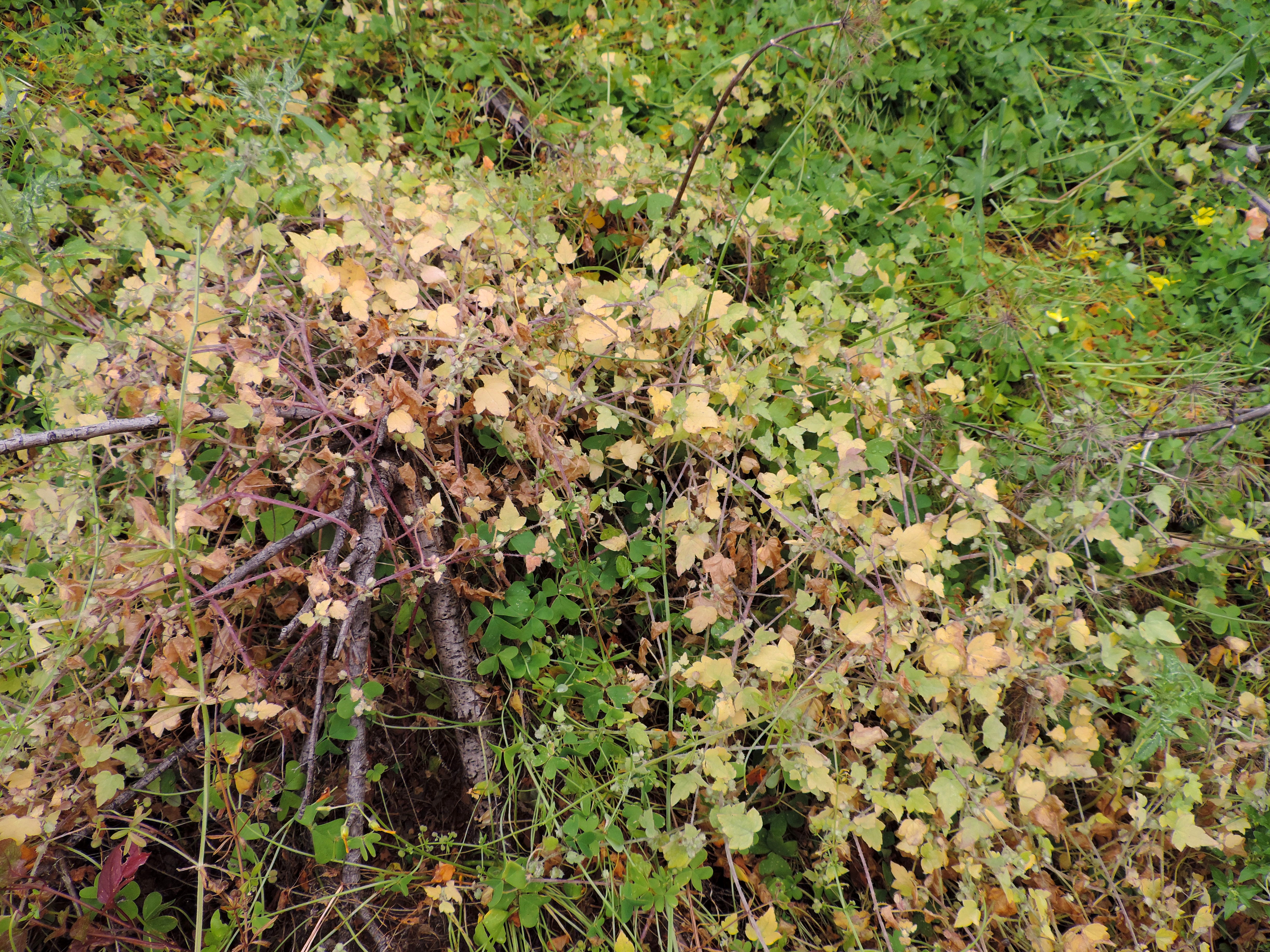

Scientific classification
- Kingdom: Plantae
- Clade: Tracheophytes
- Clade: Angiosperms
- Clade: Eudicots
- Clade: Asterids
- Order: Apiales
- Family: Apiaceae
- Subfamily: Azorelloideae
- Genus: Drusa; DC.
- Species: D. glandulosa

Binomial name
- Drusa glandulosa (Poir.) H.Wolff ex Engl.

= Drusa =

Monotypic genus of flowering plants

Drusa is a monotypic genus of flowering plants belonging to the family Apiaceae. It has one known species, Drusa glandulosa.

Its native range is Macaronesia (found on Canary Islands and Madeira), Morocco and Somalia.

Its genus name is in honour of André Pierre Ledru (1761–1825), French clergyman and botanist, and it was published and described by French botanist Augustin Pyramus de Candolle in Ann. Mus. Hist. Nat. Vol.10 on page 466 in 1807.

Drusa glandulosa (Poir.) H.Wolff ex Engl. has the following synonyms; Bowlesia glandulosa (Poir.) Kuntze, Bowlesia oppositifolia Buch, Drusa glandulosa f. glaucescens G.Kunkel, Drusa oppositifolia DC. and Sicyos glandulosus Poir.
