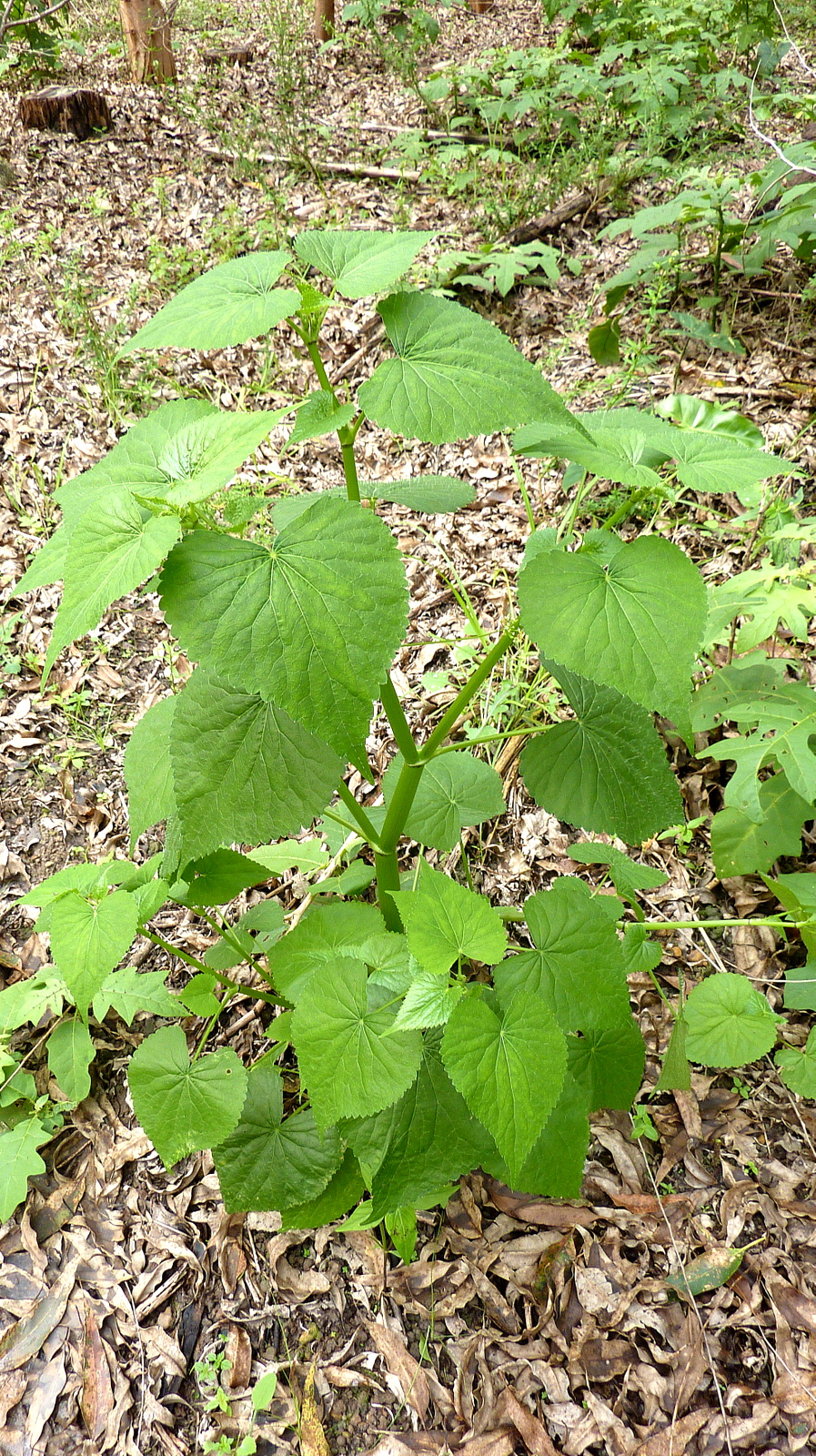

Scientific classification
- Kingdom: Plantae
- Clade: Tracheophytes
- Clade: Angiosperms
- Clade: Eudicots
- Clade: Asterids
- Order: Apiales
- Family: Apiaceae
- Subfamily: Azorelloideae
- Genus: Spananthe; Jacq.

= Spananthe =

Genus of plants

Spananthe is a genus of flowering plants belonging to the family Apiaceae.

Its native range is Mexico to Tropical America.

Species:

- Spananthe paniculata Jacq.
- Spananthe peruviana (H.Wolff) G.K.Müll.
