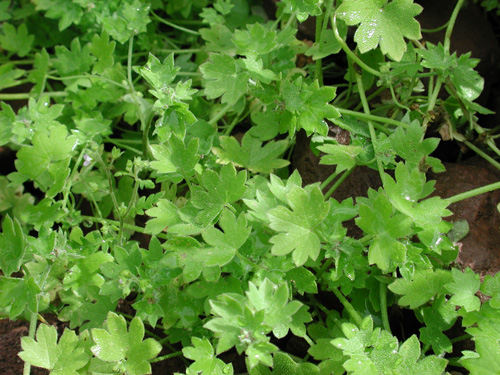

Scientific classification
- Kingdom: Plantae
- Clade: Embryophytes
- Clade: Tracheophytes
- Clade: Spermatophytes
- Clade: Angiosperms
- Clade: Eudicots
- Clade: Asterids
- Order: Apiales
- Family: Apiaceae
- Genus: Bowlesia
- Species: B. incana

Binomial name
- Bowlesia incana Ruiz & Pav.

Synonyms
- Bowlesia incana f. crassifolia Urb.; Bowlesia asiatica Nasir; Bowlesia geraniifolia Schltdl.; Bowlesia incana f. tenera (Spreng.) Urb.; Bowlesia nodiflora C.Presl ex DC.; Bowlesia rotundifolia Phil.; Bowlesia rubra Larrañaga; Bowlesia septentrionalis J.M.Coult. & Rose; Bowlesia tenera Spreng.

= Bowlesia incana =

Species of flowering plant

Bowlesia incana is a species of flowering plant, known by the common name hoary bowlesia, in the family Apiaceae. It is native to South America and the southeastern and southwestern United States as far north as Washington. It can also be found in Pakistan and New Zealand as an introduced species. It grows in many types of habitat. This is a small annual herb growing thin, spreading stems less than 60 centimeters long. The leaves are borne on long petioles and have multilobed rounded or kidney-shaped blades less than 3 centimeters wide. The green herbage of the plant is coated in fine white hairs. The inflorescences of yellow-green flowers appear in the leaf axils. The tiny inflated fruit is only 2 millimeters wide.
