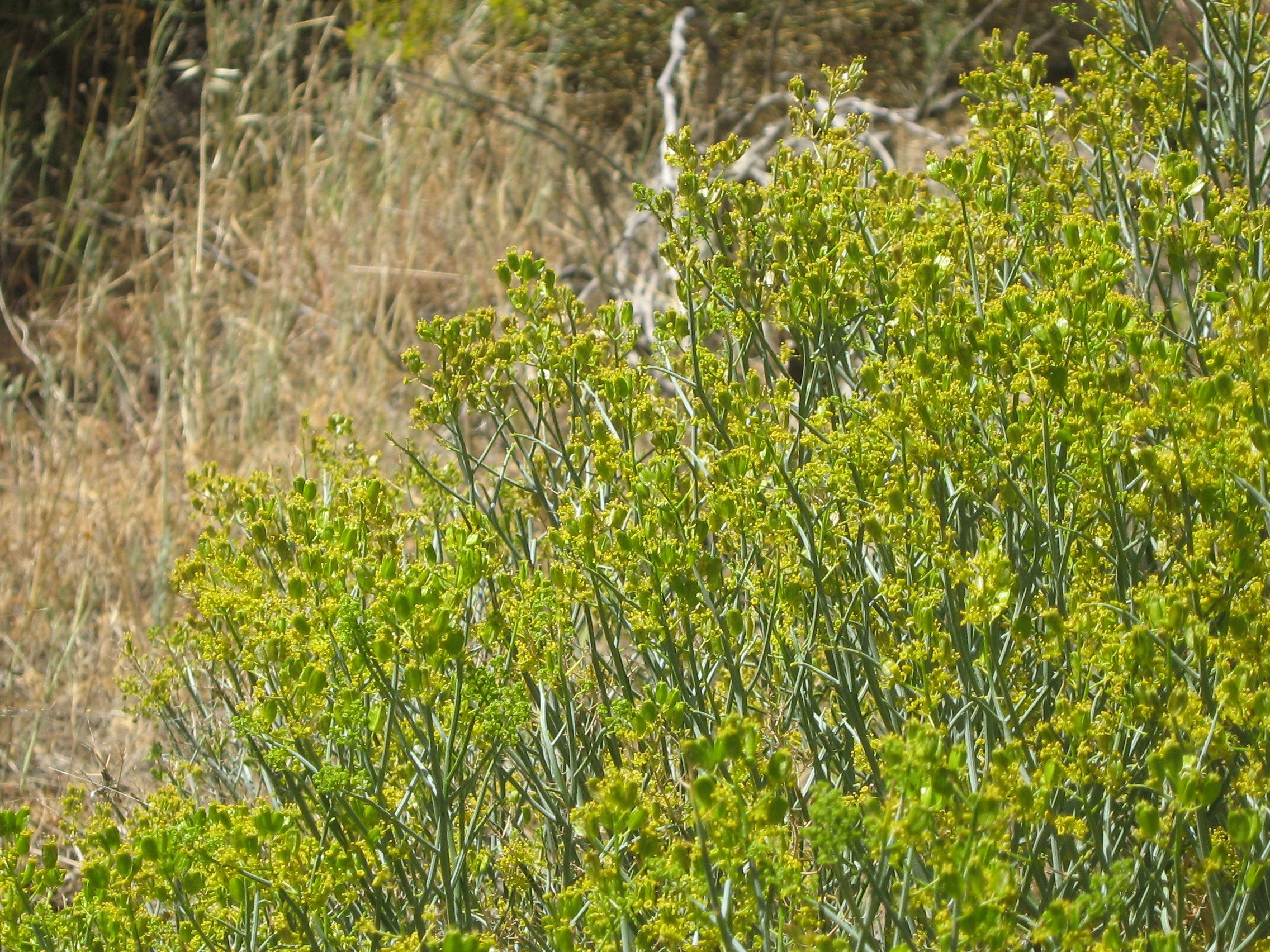
- Gymnophyton isatidicarpum

Scientific classification
- Kingdom: Plantae
- Clade: Tracheophytes
- Clade: Angiosperms
- Clade: Eudicots
- Clade: Asterids
- Order: Apiales
- Family: Apiaceae
- Subfamily: Azorelloideae
- Genus: Gymnophyton; Clos

= Gymnophyton =

Genus of plants

Gymnophyton is a genus of flowering plants belonging to the family Apiaceae.

Its native range is Chile to Western Argentina.

Species:

- Gymnophyton flexuosum Clos
- Gymnophyton foliosum Phil.
- Gymnophyton isatidicarpum (DC.) Mathias & Constance
- Gymnophyton polycephalum (Gillies & Hook.) Clos
- Gymnophyton robustum Clos
- Gymnophyton spinosissimum Phil.
