= Japanese studies =

Area studies focused on Japan

Japanese studies or Japan studies (Japanese: 日本学, Hepburn: Nihongaku), sometimes known as Japanology in Europe, is a sub-field of area studies or East Asian studies involved in social sciences and humanities research on Japan. It incorporates fields such as the study of Japanese language, history, culture, literature, philosophy, art, music, cinema, and science.

The historical roots of Western Japanese studies may be traced back to Portuguese traders based in Nagasaki during the Sengoku period, with Luís Fróis detailing Historia de Japam ('History of Japan') and João Rodrigues for compiling Arte da Lingoa de Iapam ('Art of the Tongue of Japan'), and later the Dutch traders in Dejima, during the Edo period (1603–1867). The foundation of the Asiatic Society of Japan at Yokohama in 1872 by Western scholars such as Ernest Satow and Frederick Victor Dickins was an important event in the development of Japanese studies as an academic discipline.

== Japanese studies organizations and publications ==
In the United States, the Society for Japanese Studies has published the Journal of Japanese Studies (JJS) since 1974. This is a biannual academic journal dealing with research on Japan in the United States. JJS is supported by grants from the Japan Foundation, Georgetown University, and the University of Washington in addition to endowments from the Kyocera Corporation and the National Endowment for the Humanities.

The British Association for Japanese Studies (BAJS), founded in 1974, is an association primarily sponsored by Toshiba and the Japan Foundation. The BAJS publishes an academic journal called Japan Forum.

In Europe, the European Association for Japanese Studies (EAJS) is also funded by Toshiba and the Japan Foundation. It has held triennial conferences around Europe since 1973. Other academic journals dealing with Japanese studies include Monumenta Nipponica, a biannual English-language journal affiliated with Sophia University in Tokyo, and Social Science Japan Journal, published by Oxford University Press.

Scholarship on Japan is also within the purview of many organizations and publications dealing with the more general field of East Asian studies, such as the Association for Asian Studies or the Duke University publication Positions: Asia Critique.

The International Research Center for Japanese Studies (Nichibunken) maintains an online database of institutions involved in Japanese studies research worldwide, including information on 1,640 institutions of Japanese studies. The database indicates that the country with the most institutions of Japanese studies outside the United States and Japan is China (121), while other countries containing a significant number of institutions include South Korea (85), England (69), Germany (64), Canada (61), Australia (54), and France (54).

Since the declaration of 2010 as the "Japan Year" in Turkey, a yearly Japan Studies Conference has been held in Turkey.

== Scholarly journals ==
- Bulletin of the National Museum of Japanese History, In Japanese
- East Asian History
- Japan Forum
- Japanese Studies
- Japanese Journal of Religious Studies
- Journal of Japanese Studies
- Monumenta Nipponica, Japanese studies, in English
- Sino-Japanese Studies
- Social Science Japan Journal

== See also ==
- International Research Center for Japanese Studies
- Japan Academy
- Japanophilia
- List of Japanologists
- Oriental studies
