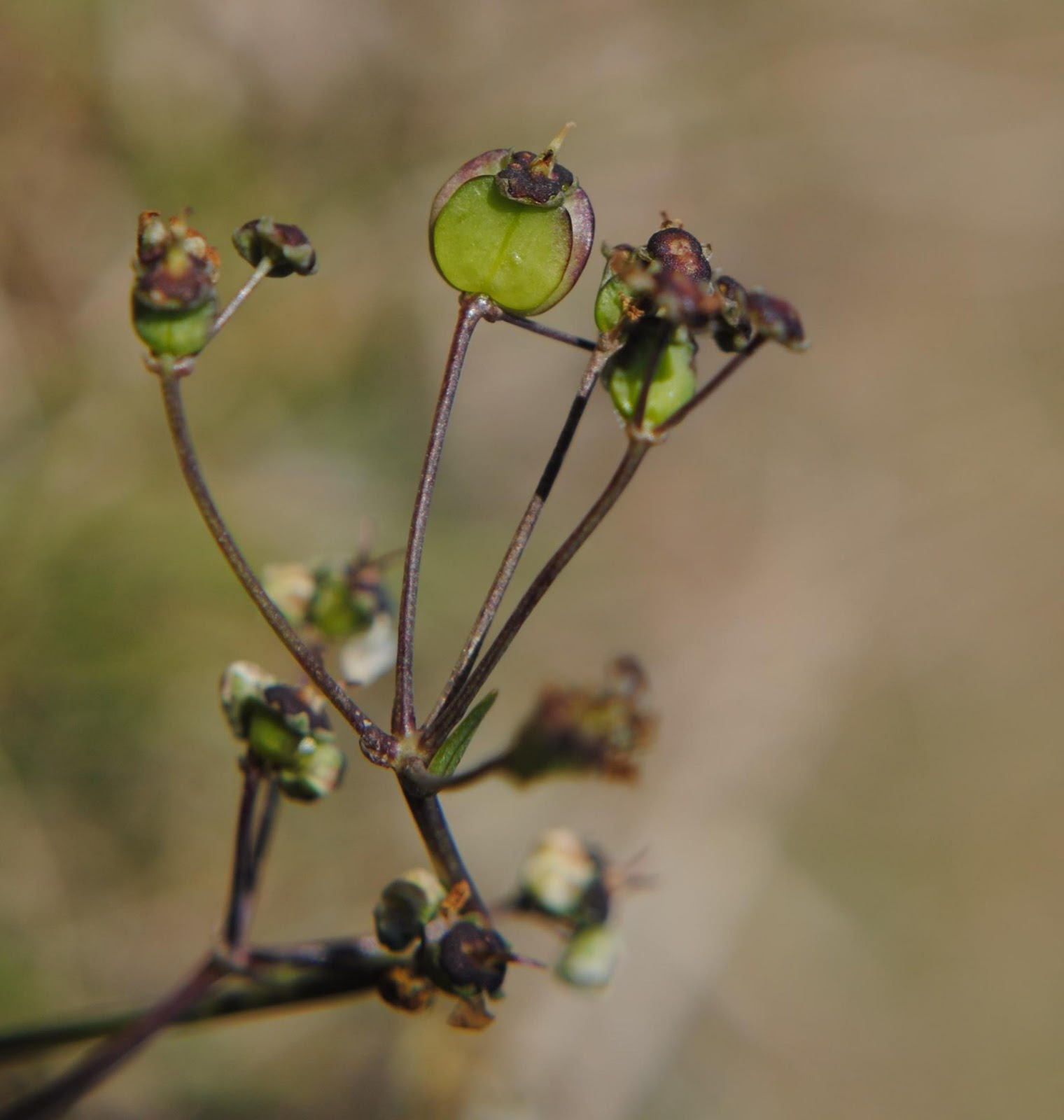
- Diposis saniculaefolia

Scientific classification
- Kingdom: Plantae
- Clade: Tracheophytes
- Clade: Angiosperms
- Clade: Eudicots
- Clade: Asterids
- Order: Apiales
- Family: Apiaceae
- Subfamily: Azorelloideae
- Genus: Diposis; DC.

= Diposis =

Genus of plants

Diposis is a genus of flowering plants belonging to the family Apiaceae.

Its native range is Southern South America.

Species:

- Diposis bulbocastanum DC.
- Diposis patagonica Skottsb.
- Diposis saniculifolia (Lam.) DC.
