= Francesca Orsini =

Italian scholar of South Asian literature

Francesca Orsini FBA
- Citizenship: Italy
- Occupations: Scholar, literary critic, historian
- Employer: SOAS University of London
- Known for: Scholarship on Hindi and Urdu literature, multilingual literary cultures, book and print history, and North Indian literary traditions
- Spouse: Peter Kornicki
- Awards: Fellow of the British Academy (2017)

Francesca Orsini FBA is an Italian scholar of South Asian literature. She is currently Professor of Hindi and South Asian Literature at the School of Oriental and African Studies (SOAS), University of London. She previously lectured at the University of Cambridge, before joining SOAS in 2006. For the 2013/2014 academic year, she was Mary I. Bunting Institute Fellow at the Radcliffe Institute for Advanced Study, Harvard University.

== Personal life ==
In 1998, Orsini married Peter Kornicki, an English Japanologist. Orsini is an Italian citizen, and has not applied for either UK citizenship or permanent residence.

== Visa violation accusation in India ==
On 20 October 2025, she was denied entry into India at Indira Gandhi International Airport in Delhi and sent back. According to officials associated with India’s Ministry of Home Affairs, Orsini had been blacklisted in March 2025 for violating the conditions of her tourist visa, allegedly by undertaking academic/research activities during an earlier visit that were not permitted under that visa category. Earlier reports said that no reason was initially given to Orsini when she was stopped at the airport, and her husband also said that the authorities had not explained the decision to her.

== Honours ==
In July 2017, Orsini was elected a Fellow of the British Academy (FBA), the United Kingdom's national academy for the humanities and social sciences. Her scholarship focuses on Hindi and Urdu literature, multilingual literary cultures, book and print history, and the literary traditions of North India.

== Selected works ==
- Francesca, Orsini (2002). The Hindi Public Sphere 1920-1940: Language and Literature in the Age of Nationalism. Oxford: Oxford University Press. ISBN 978-0195650846.
- Orsini, Francesca (2004). The Oxford India Premchand. Oxford: Oxford University Press. ISBN 978-0195665017.
- Orsini, Francesca, ed. (2006). Love in South Asia: A Cultural History. Cambridge: Cambridge University Press. ISBN 978-0521856782.
- Orsini, Francesca (2009). Print and Pleasure: Popular Literature and Entertaining Fictions in Colonial North India. Delhi: Permanent Black. ISBN 978-8178242491.
- Orsini, Francesca (2009). The Hindi Public Sphere 1920–1940: Language and Literature in the Age of Nationalism. New Delhi: OUP India. ISBN 978-0199088805.
- Orsini, Francesca (2010). Before the Divide: Hindi and Urdu Literary Culture. Telangana: Orient BlackSwan. ISBN 978-8125038290.
- Orsini, Francesca; Sheikh, Samira, eds. (2014). After Timur Left: Culture and Circulation in Fifteenth-century North India. Oxford: Oxford University Press. ISBN 978-0199450664.
- Orsini, Francesca; Butler Schofield, Katherine, eds. (2015). Tellings and Texts: Music, Literature and Performance in North India. Open Book Publishers. doi:10.11647/obp.0062. ISBN 978-1783741021.
