= Domeykoa =

Scientific classification
- Kingdom: Plantae
- Clade: Tracheophytes
- Clade: Angiosperms
- Clade: Eudicots
- Clade: Asterids
- Order: Apiales
- Family: Apiaceae
- Subfamily: Azorelloideae
- Genus: Domeykoa; Phil.

Genus of plants

Domeykoa is a genus of flowering plants belonging to the family Apiaceae.

Its native range is southern Peru to northern Chile.

German-Chilean botanist Rudolfo Amando Philippi named the genus Domeykoa in honour of Ignacy Domeyko (1802–1889), Polish-Chilean geologist, mineralogist, and educator, The genus was first described in Florula Atacamensis in 1860.

Known species:

- Domeykoa amplexicaulis (H.Wolff) Mathias & Constance
- Domeykoa andina Saldivia & Faúndez
- Domeykoa oppositifolia Phil.
- Domeykoa perennis I.M.Johnst.
- Domeykoa saniculifolia Mathias & Constance
