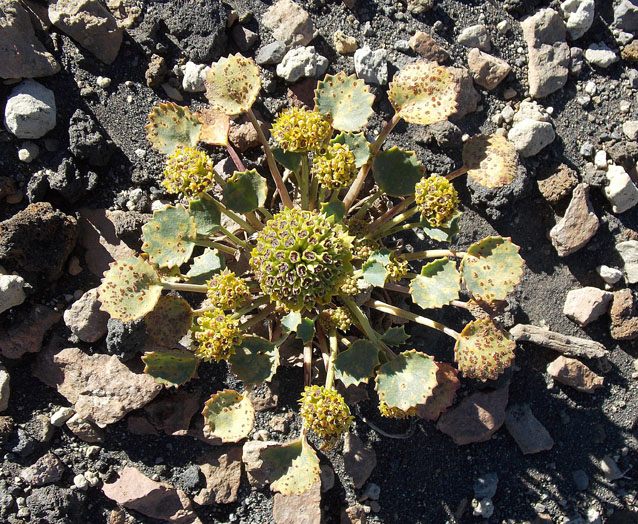
- Pozoa volcanica

Scientific classification
- Kingdom: Plantae
- Clade: Tracheophytes
- Clade: Angiosperms
- Clade: Eudicots
- Clade: Asterids
- Order: Apiales
- Family: Apiaceae
- Subfamily: Azorelloideae
- Genus: Pozoa; Lag.

= Pozoa =

Genus of flowering plant

Pozoa is a genus of flowering plants belonging to the family Apiaceae, subfamily Azorelloideae.

== Distribution ==
It is native to Argentina and Chile in southern South America.

== Taxonomy ==
The genus name of Pozoa is in honour of José Pozo (fl. 1800), a Spanish botanist at a botanical garden in Madrid. It was first described and published in Gen. Sp. Pl. on page 13 in 1816.

== Known species ==
According to Kew:

- Pozoa coriacea Lag.
- Pozoa volcanica Mathias & Constance
