= James Quandt =

Canadian film historian

James Quandt is a Canadian film historian and festival programmer, best known as the longtime head programmer of the TIFF Cinematheque program of film retrospectives.

Originally from Saskatoon, Saskatchewan, Quandt first moved to Toronto in the mid-1980s to work as curator of film screening series at the Harbourfront Centre. In 1990, when the Toronto International Film Festival took over management and operations of Gerald Pratley's Ontario Film Institute, Quandt was named Pratley's successor as head of the program, which was renamed Cinematheque later the same year. Exhibitions and retrospectives he has created for TIFF also frequently toured internationally.

He has also been a regular contributor of film criticism and analysis to Artforum magazine and The Criterion Collection, and has been the editor of scholarly monographs on the films of Robert Bresson, Shōhei Imamura, Kon Ichikawa and Apichatpong Weerasethakul.

He retired from TIFF in 2021, after having led the Cinematheque program for 31 years.

== Awards ==
He was named a chevalier of France's Ordre des Arts et des Lettres in 1995 in honour of his work analyzing and curating French film, and was awarded the Japan Foundation's Special Prize for Arts and Culture in 2004 for his work on Japanese film.

In 2001 he was named the recipient of the Toronto Film Critics Association's Clyde Gilmour Award.
