= Ian Nish =

British Japanologist (1926–2022)

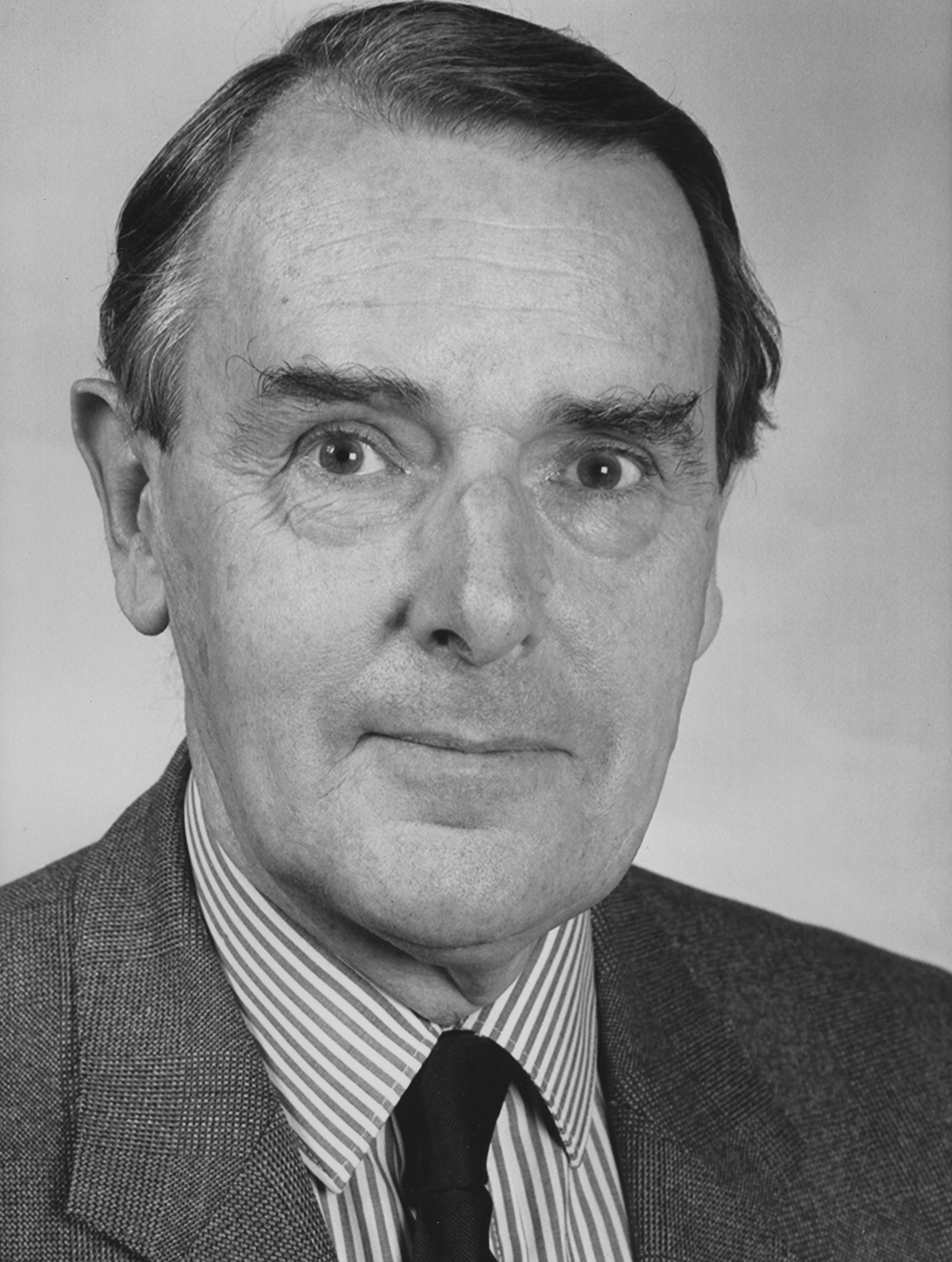
Ian Nish

Ian Hill Nish CBE (3 June 1926 – 31 July 2022) was a British historian and academic. A specialist in Japanese studies, he was Professor of International History at the London School of Economics and Political Science (LSE), where he taught from 1963 until his retirement in 1991. His scholarship relating to the Anglo-Japanese Alliance, Japanese foreign policy and Anglo-Japanese relations in the twentieth century has garnered international renown.

== Early life and war years ==
Nish was born in Burghmuirhead, Edinburgh, on 3 June 1926, to David Nish and Marion née Hill. He was educated at George Watson's College.

World War II gave opportunity to many young non-Japanese to become specialists in Japanese studies, and Nish became one of them. His first encounter with Japan came around 1941 when he was still an Edinburgh schoolboy. His school announced a government program for volunteers who wanted to learn difficult Oriental languages, but he was too young then to apply. He was called up for service in the British Armed Forces in 1944, and completed infantry and artillery training after being transferred from the Royal Air Force. He was then posted to India with the Intelligence Corps. He put in for a crash course in Japanese and was accepted. The School of Japanese Studies had been opened in an old mansion in Simla, and it later moved to Karachi. The program had strong courses in Japanese language, but nothing in Japanese history or the nature of Japanese society. With the end of the war and the end of the course in 1946, the "semi-linguists" were sent to the Southeast Asia Translation and Interrogation Center in Johor Bahru, British Malaya. The course graduates were given translation duties, and were used as interpreters for interrogations at Changi prison.

In 1947, within a few months of his graduation, Nish, serving in the rank of captain, was ordered to the British Commonwealth Occupation Force in Japan. In Kure, Nish found himself in the headquarters of the Combined Services Detailed Interrogation Center. Amongst varied duties in the Translation Section, he was assigned to translate regional newspapers. In that role, he and others were not called upon to draw on their knowledge of the older 'kanji' which they had learned, since a working list of 1,800 characters had been specified by the Ministry of Education for use in the press from New Year's Eve, 1946.

== Academic career ==
In 1948, on his return to the United Kingdom, Nish chose to pick up his interrupted honors degree in history at the University of Edinburgh, rather than starting a degree in Japanese at the School of Oriental and African Studies (SOAS) in London. He was awarded his M.A. at Edinburgh in 1951. In Japan, Nish had collected material on the Anglo-Japanese alliance which had been formalized in 1902. With that material in hand, he moved to SOAS to begin work on his doctorate under the supervision of William G. Beasley. He became a student member of the Japan Society of London and the China Society.

Nish's first academic appointment was to the history department of the University of Sydney. He spent six months in Japan on his way to Australia in 1957. He remembers that Sydney students at that time were becoming more interested in Japan. As he recalls, the courses in Asian history were ranked as popular during this period. Nish, who was the first editor of the Journal of the Oriental Society of Australia, stayed in Australia until 1962.

Nish joined the Department of International History at the London School of Economics and Political Science in 1963 and remained there until his retirement in 1991. His research focused on Japanese foreign relations, including the Anglo-Japanese Alliance, the Russo-Japanese War, and Japan's relations with international institutions.

He was an instrumental figure in the establishment of the British Association for Japanese Studies in 1974 and later served as its secretary. He was president of the European Association for Japanese Studies from 1985 to 1988. He also chaired the Japan Foundation Endowment Committee from 1983 to 1991 and served on the council of the Japan Society.

Nish retired in 1991. He then accepted the position of honorary senior research associate of the Suntory Toyota International Centre for Economics and Related Disciplines (STICERD). This position proved invaluable in enabling Nish to complete certain research projects which were crowded out by administrative chores during his last years of teaching. In 2001-2002, two volumes of his collected writings were simultaneously published in Britain and Japan.

Following a Japanese government initiative announced in 1995, Nish served as convenor of the British contributors to the Anglo-Japanese History Project, with Chihiro Hosoya as his Japanese counterpart. The project held conferences and workshops in Britain and Japan and produced six volumes covering political, diplomatic, economic, cultural, and strategic relations between the two countries.

To mark the centenary of the Russo-Japanese War, Nish compiled and introduced the eight-volume collection The Russo-Japanese War, 1904–5.

In 2016, at the age of 90, Nish published his final major work, the two-volume The History of Manchuria, 1840–1948: A Sino-Russo-Japanese Triangle.

== Personal life and death ==
Nish died on 31 July 2022, at the age of 96.

=== Honors ===
- Japan Academy (Honorary member), 2007.
- Commander of the Order of the British Empire.
- Order of the Rising Sun, Gold Rays with Neck Ribbon, 1991.
- Japan Foundation: Japan Foundation Award, 1991.

== Selected works ==
In a statistical overview derived from writings by and about Nish, OCLC/WorldCat encompasses roughly 200+ works in 300+ publications in 4 languages and 7,000+ library holdings.

2003

- Nish, Ian, ed. The Russo-Japanese War, 1904-5: A Collection of Eight Volumes. Folkestone, Kent : Global Oriental. ISBN 978-1-901903-06-5 (set) -- OCLC 56955351
  - Volume 1: Historical Introduction Selected papers and Documents by Ian Nish
  - Volume 2: A Staff officer’s Scrap-book during the Russo-Japanese War, Vol. I (1905) by Sir Ian Hamilton. ISBN 978-1-901903-17-1
  - Volume 3: A Staff officer’s Scrap-book during the Russo-Japanese War, Vol. II (1907) by Sir Ian Hamilton. ISBN 978-1-901903-22-5
  - Volume 4: With the Russians in Manchuria (1905) by Maurice Baring. ISBN 978-1-901903-27-0
  - Volume 5: The War in the Far East (1905) by Charles à Court Repington. ISBN 978-1-901903-32-4
  - Volume 6: Port Arthur. The Siege and Capitulation (1906) by Ellis Ashmead-Bartlett. ISBN 978-1-901903-37-9
  - Volume 7: From Libau to Tsushima: A narrative of the voyage of Admiral Rojdestvensky’s fleet to Eastern seas, including a detailed account of the Dogger Bank Incident, tr. Major Frederick Rowlandson Godfrey (1906) By Eugene S. Politovsky. ISBN 978-1-901903-42-3
  - Volume 8: The Battle of Tsushima Between the Japanese and Russian Fleets, fought on 27 May 1905, tr. Captain Alexander Bertram Lindsay (1912) by Captain Vladimir Semeoff; combined with A Subaltern in Old Russia, tr. Ivor Montagu (1944) by Lieutenant-General A.A. Ignatyev. ISBN 978-1-901903-47-8

2002

- Nish, Ian. Collected Writings, Part 2: Japan, Russian and East Asia. (Collected Writings of Modern Western Scholars on Japan, Vol. 7.) London: Routledge. ISBN 978-1-903350-12-6 (cloth)

2001

- Nish, Ian. Collected Writings, Part 1. (Collected Writings of Modern Western Scholars on Japan, Vol. 6.) London: Routledge. ISBN 978-1-873410-60-8 (cloth)

2000

- Nish, Ian. "Echoes of Alliance, 1920-1930" in The History of Anglo-Japanese Relations, Vol. I (edited by Ian Nish and Yoichi Kibata). London: Macmillan.
- _________. "Itō Hirobumi's Overseas Sojourns," Bulletin of the European Association of Japanese Studies, Vol. 55.
- _________. "Nationalism in Japan" in In Asian Nationalism (edited by M. Leifer). London: Routledge.
- _________. Nichi-ei Kotsushi, Vol. I: 1600-1930; Vol. II: 1930-2000. Tokyo: University of Tokyo Press.
- _________. "Policies of the European Powers in Southeast Asia, 1893-1910" in King Chulalongkorn's Visit to Europe (edited by C. Tingsabadh). Bangkok: Chulalongkorn University Press.
- _________. "Repercussions of the Asia-Pacific War on Independence Movements in Indonesia" in Europe, Southeast Asia in the Contemporary World (edited by P. Bunnag, F. Knipping, S. Chonchirdsin, S. Nomos.
- _________ and Yoichi Kibata. The History of Anglo-Japanese Relations: The Political-diplomatic Dimension. Vol. I: 1600-1930; Vol. II: 1930-2000. London: Macmillan. ISBN 978-1-4039-1967-0

1999

- Nish, Ian."Aoki Shūzō 1844-1914" in Britain and Japan: Biographical Portraits, Vol. 3 (edited by J.E. Hoare). London: Curzon.
- _________. "Auviarsi del Giappone verso L'Autonomia Economica: La Marina Mercantile" in La Rinascita di una Grande Potenza (edited by V. Ferretti, G. Giordano). Francoangeli.
- _________. "Britain and Postwar Thinking on Decolonization in Southeast Asia, 1943-1946" in Europe and Southeast Asia in the Contemporary World (edited by F. Knipping). Nomos.
- _________. "Changing Japan," Euro-Japanese Journal, Vol. 6, No. 1.
- _________. "George Bailey Sansom and his Tokyo Friends, 1903-47," Bulletin of the Asiatic Society of Japan, No. 8.
- _________. "Sir George Sansom: Diplomat and Historian" (Annual Cortazzi Lecture) in Proceedings of the Japan Society.

1994

- Nish, Ian and James E. Hoare, eds. Britain & Japan: Biographical Portraits, Vol. II. London: RoutledgeCurzon. ISBN 1-873410-62-X
- _________, ed. Britain & Japan: Biographical Portraits, Vol. I. Folkestone, Kent: Japan Library. ISBN 1-873410-27-1

1972

- Nish, Ian. (1972). Alliance in Decline: A Study in Anglo-Japanese Relations 1908-23. London: Athlone Press. ISBN 978-0-485-13133-8 (cloth)

1966

- Nish, Ian. (1966). The Anglo-Japanese Alliance: The diplomacy of two island empires 1894-1907. London: Athlone Press. [reprinted by RoutledgeCurzon, London, 2004. ISBN 978-0-415-32611-7 (paper)]

=== Centre for Economic Performance ===
Prof. Nish co-authored a number of Centre for Economic Performance (CEP) papers:

- 2005 - On the Periphery of the Russo-Japanese War Part II by Ian Nish, David Steeds: Paper No. IS/2005/491: Read Full paper (pdf) -- May '08.
- 2004 - On the Periphery of the Russo-Japanese War - Part I by John Chapman, Ian Nish: Paper No. IS/2004/475: Read Full paper (pdf) -- 2008
- 2003 - Studies in the Anglo-Japanese Alliance (1902-1923). Gordon Daniels, Janet Hunter, Ian Nish, David Steeds: Paper No. IS/2003/443: Read Full paper (pdf) -- May 2008
- 2002 - Anglo-Japanese Alliance by Ayako Hotta-Lister, Ian Nish, David Steeds: Paper No. IS/2002/432: Read [ Full paper (pdf) -- May '08]
- 1997 - Japan in the 1950s by Valdo Ferretti, Peter Lowe, Ian Nish: Paper No. IS/1997/322.
- 1994 - The Sino-Japanese War of 1894-5 in its International Dimension by J Berryman, K Neilson, Ian Nish: Paper No. IS/1994/278.
- 1991 - Aspects of the Allied Occupation of Japan, Part II by Susie Harries, Ian Nish, L. van Poelgeest: Paper No. IS/1991/229.
- 1991 - Japan - Thailand Relations by Nigel Brailey, Patrick Davis, Junzo Iida, Ian Nish: Paper No. IS/1991/228.
- 1991 - East Asia in the Postwar Period, 1945-55 by Farooq Bajwa, Yoichi Kibata, Ian Nish, Ann Trotter: Paper No. IS/1991/225.
- 1991 - The Occupation of Japan 1945-52 by Akira Amakawa, Makoto Iokibe, Walter Miller, Ian Nish: Paper No. IS/1991/224.
- 1991 - The British Commonwealth and its Contribution to the Occupation of Japan, 1945-1948 by W G Beasley, Sir Hugh Cortazzi, Bruce Kirkpatrick, T B Millar, Ian Nish: Paper No. IS/1991/227: Read Full paper (pdf) -- May '08.
- 1990 - Shigemitsu Studies by Antony Best, Ian Nish, L. van Poelgeest, Takahiko Tanaka: Paper No. IS/1990/219.
- 1990 - Shigemitsu Studies by Antony Best, Ian Nish, L. van Poelgeest, Takahiko Tanaka: Paper No. IS/1990/219.
- 1990 - The Soviet Union in East Asia by Jonathan Haslam, Ian Nish, Jon Pardoe, Zhang Yongjin: Paper No. IS/1990/213.
- 1990 - The Social History of Occupied Japan: 1: Some Sources and Problems, 2: British Writings on Japanese Historyby Gordon Daniels, Janet Hunter, Ian Nish: Paper No. JS/1990/214: Read Full paper (pdf) -- May '08.
- 1990 - The Japanese Constitution of 1889 by Stephen S. Large, Ian Nish, Chuhei Sugiyama: Paper No. IS/1989/208.
- 1989 - Educational and Technological Exchange in 19th Century Asia by Oliver Checkland, E C.T. Chew, Ian Nish, Chuhei Sugiyama: Paper No. IS/1989/204.
- 1989 - Japan and the Second World War. Toshiko Marks, Ian Nish, R. John Pritchard; Paper No. IS/1989/197.
- 1989 - Interwar Japanby Janet Hunter, James W. Morley, Takafusa Nakamura, Ian Nish (1989): Paper No. IS/1989/187.
- 1988 - Borrowing and Adaptation: Studies in Tokugawa, Meiji and Taisho Japan by Naoki Hiraishi, Ian Nish (1988): Paper No' IS/1988/177.
- 1987 - South Asia in International Affairs 1947-56 by Premen Addy, Ian Nish, Anita Inder Singh, Takahiko Tanaka: Paper No. IS/1987/166.
- 1987 - Aspects of the Korean War by Akira Iriye, Olof Lidin, Peter Lowe, Ian Nish: Paper No. IS/1987/152.
- 1986 - German-Japanese Relations in the 1930s by Nobutoshi Hagihara, Kiyoshi Ikeda, Ian Nish, Erich Pauer: Paper No' IS/1986/140.
- 1986 - Anglo-Japanese Relations in the 1930s and 1940s by A Adamthwaite, Yoichi Kibata, Ian Nish: Paper No. IS/1986/137.
- 1986 - Aspects of the Allied Occupation of Japan by H Baerwald, Roger Buckley, Ian Nish, Ann Trotter: Paper No. IS/1986/131.
- 1985 - Anglo-Japanese Naval Relations by John Chapman, Ian Gow, Kiyoshi Ikeda, Ian Nish, Chit-Chung Ong: Paper No. IS/1985/127.
- 1985 - 1945 in South-East Asia - Part Two by Ian Nish, Masaya Shiraishi: Paper No. IS/1985/123.
- 1985 - 1945 in South-East Asia - Part One by Louis Allen, Ian Nish, T. Smitabhindu, Judith Stowe: Paper No. IS/1985/116.
- 1984 - Aspects of Anglo-Korean Relations by Roger Bullen, James Hoare, Ian Nish: Paper No. IS/1984/90.
- 1984 - The Tripartite Pact of 1940: Japan, Germany and Italy by Ernest Bramsted, John Chapman, Jost Dulffer, Ian Nish: Paper No. IS/1984/107.
- 1983 - The British Commonwealth and the Occupation of Japan by G Bolton, Gordon Daniels, G Goodman, Hamish Ion, Ian Nish, Eiji Takemae: Paper No. IS/1983/78.
- 1982 - Some Aspects of Soviet-Japanese Relations in the 1930s by B Bridges, John Chapman, Jonathan Haslam, Akira Iriye, Ian Nish, Haruhiko Nishi: Paper No. IS/1982/56.
- 1982 - The East Asian Crisis, 1945-1951 - The Problem of China, Korea and Japan by Roger Dingman, Chihiro Hosoya, Ian Nish: Paper No. IS/1982/49.
- 1982 - Bakumatsu and Meiji: Studies in Japan's Economic and Social History by Oliver Checkland, Gordon Daniels, Janet Hunter, J-P Lehmann, Ian Nish, Shinya Sugiyama: Paper No. IS/1982/42.
- 1981 - The Russian Problem in East Asia by Peter Lowe, Ian Nish, Naotake Nobuhara, David Steeds: Paper No. IS/1981/38.
- 1980 - Some Foreign Attitudes to Republican China by Dudley Cheke, Taichiro Mitani, Ian Nish, David Steeds, Ann Trotter: Paper No. IS/1980/16.

== See also ==
- Global Oriental
