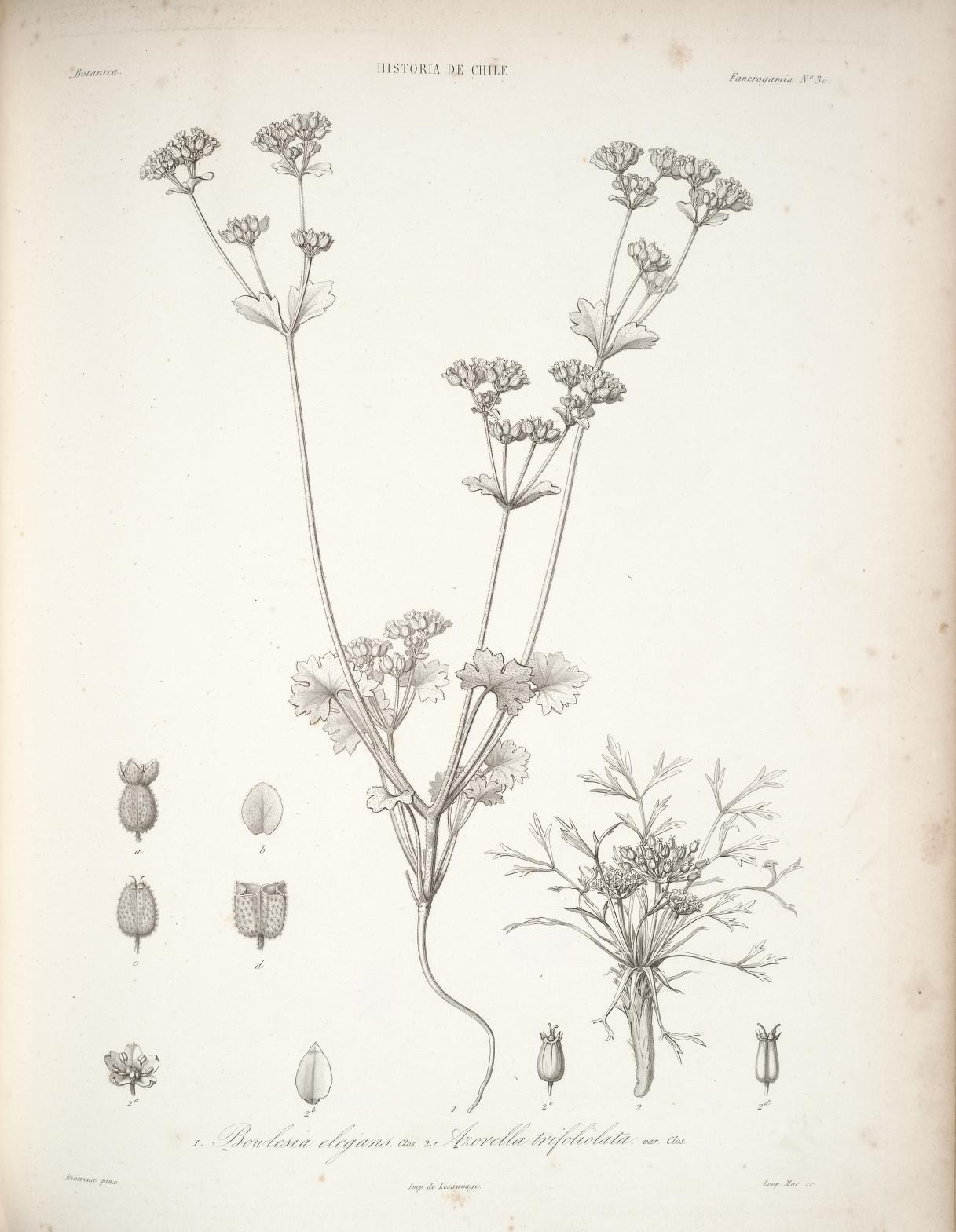
- Homalocarpus bowlesioides botanical illustration

Scientific classification
- Kingdom: Plantae
- Clade: Embryophytes
- Clade: Tracheophytes
- Clade: Angiosperms
- Clade: Eudicots
- Clade: Asterids
- Order: Apiales
- Family: Apiaceae
- Subfamily: Azorelloideae
- Genus: Homalocarpus; Hook. & Arn.

Species
- See text

Synonyms
- Elsneria Walp.

= Homalocarpus =

Genus of flowering plants

Homalocarpus is a genus of flowering plants in the family Apiaceae, found in Chile. They are annual herbs with white, yellow, red or purple flowers.

== Species ==
Currently accepted species include:

- Homalocarpus bowlesioides Hook. & Arn.
- Homalocarpus dichotomus (Poepp. ex DC.) Mathias & Constance
- Homalocarpus digitatus (Phil.) Mathias & Constance
- Homalocarpus dissectus Mathias & Constance
- Homalocarpus integerrimus (Turcz.) Mathias & Constance
- Homalocarpus nigripetalus (Clos) Mathias & Constance
