= Dickinsia =

Scientific classification
- Kingdom: Plantae
- Clade: Tracheophytes
- Clade: Angiosperms
- Clade: Eudicots
- Clade: Asterids
- Order: Apiales
- Family: Apiaceae
- Subfamily: Azorelloideae
- Genus: Dickinsia; Franch.
- Species: D. hydrocotyloides

Binomial name
- Dickinsia hydrocotyloides Franch.

Synonyms
- Cotylonia bracteata C.Norman

Genus of plants

Dickinsia is a monotypic genus of flowering plants belonging to the family Apiaceae. The only known species is Dickinsia hydrocotyloides.

Its native range is Central China.

The genus is named after Frederick Dickins (1838–1915), British scholar and amateur botanist. It was first published and described by Adrien René Franchet in Nouv. Arch. Mus. Hist. Nat., séries 2, Vol.8 on page 244 in 1885 (publ. 1886).
