= Asteriscium =

Scientific classification
- Kingdom: Plantae
- Clade: Tracheophytes
- Clade: Angiosperms
- Clade: Eudicots
- Clade: Asterids
- Order: Apiales
- Family: Apiaceae
- Subfamily: Azorelloideae
- Genus: Asteriscium; Cham. & Schltdl.

Species
- 9; see text

Synonyms
- Bustillosia Clos (1848); Cassidocarpus C.Presl ex DC. (1830); Dipterygia C.Presl ex DC. (1830)

Genus of flowering plants

Asteriscium is a genus of flowering plant in the family Apiaceae, with 9 species. It is endemic to temperate South America.

== Species ==
Nine species are accepted.

- Asteriscium aemocarpon Clos
- Asteriscium argentinum Chodat & Wilczek
- Asteriscium chilense Cham. & Schltdl.
- Asteriscium closii (Kuntze) Mathias & Constance
- Asteriscium famatinense Hieron. & H.Wolff
- Asteriscium fimbriatum Speg.
- Asteriscium glaucum Hieron. & H.Wolff
- Asteriscium novarae Constance & Charpin
- Asteriscium vidalii Phil.
