= National Museum of Japanese History =

- 国立歴史民俗博物館
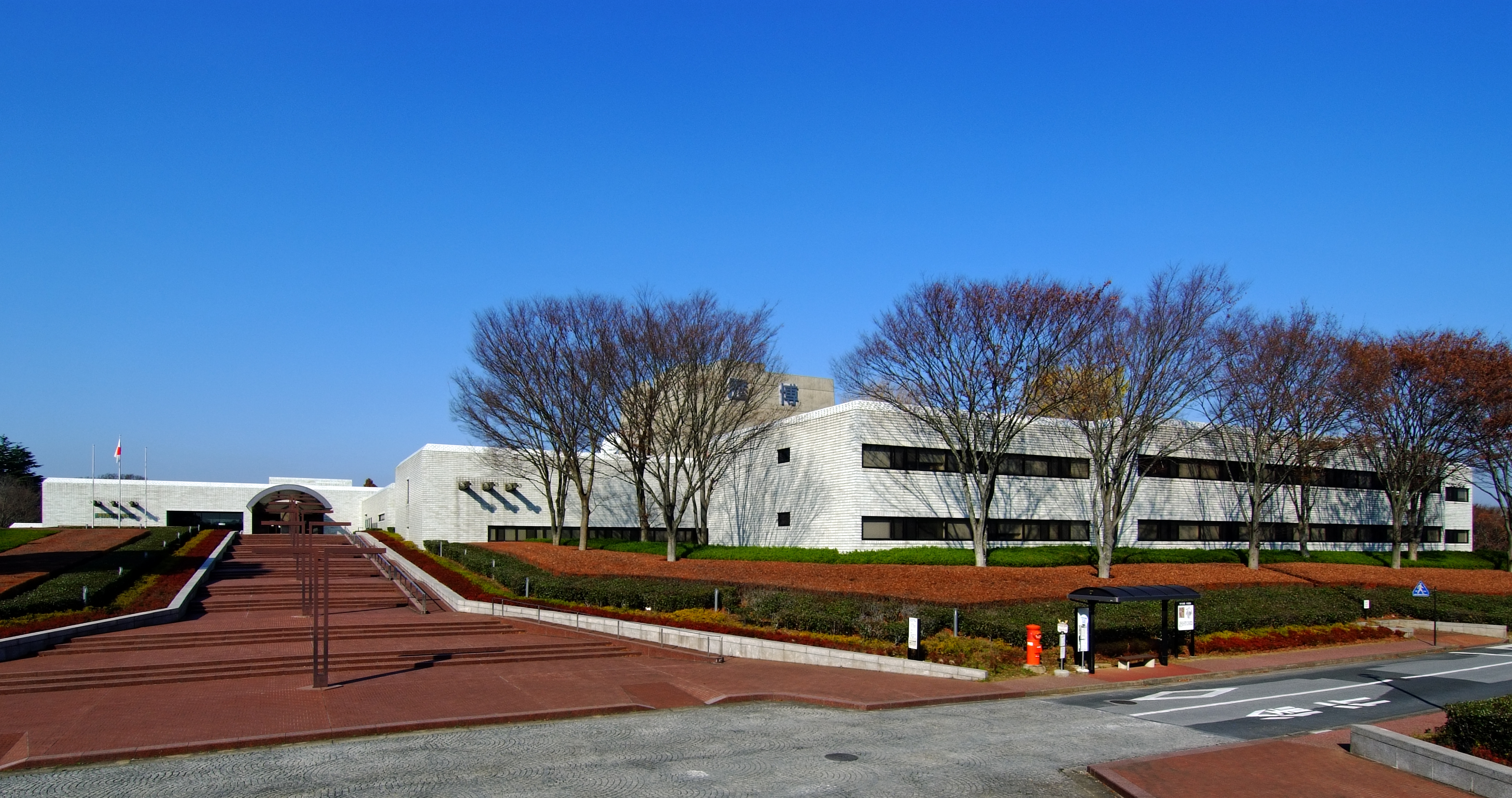
- National Museum of Japanese History, Sakura, Chiba

- Location of National Museum of Japanese History in Japan
- Established: 1981
- Coordinates: 35.724497°N 140.219081°E
- Type: Historical museum
- Collection size: 200,000
- Director: Minami Hirakawa
- Website: National Museum of Japanese History(in English) 国立歴史民俗博物(in Japanese)

The National Museum of Japanese History (国立歴史民俗博物館, Kokuritsu Rekishi Minzoku Hakubutsukan), commonly known in Japanese as Rekihaku, is a history museum in Sakura, Chiba, Japan. The museum was founded in 1981 as an inter-university research consortium, and opened in 1983. The collections of the museum focus on the history, archaeology, and folk culture of Japan.

== Publications ==
- Bulletin of the National Museum of Japanese History: reviewed academic journal
- REKIHAKU: triannual (three times per year) magazine for general readership

== See also ==
- List of National Treasures of Japan (ancient documents)
- List of National Treasures of Japan (writings)
