= Diplaspis =

Scientific classification
- Kingdom: Plantae
- Clade: Tracheophytes
- Clade: Angiosperms
- Clade: Eudicots
- Clade: Asterids
- Order: Apiales
- Family: Apiaceae
- Subfamily: Azorelloideae
- Genus: Diplaspis; Hook.f.

Species
- Diplaspis cordifolia (Hook.) Hook.f.; Diplaspis hydrocotyle Hook.f.; Diplaspis nivis Van den Borre & Henwood

Genus of flowering plants

Diplaspis is a small genus of flowering plant in the family Apiaceae, with three species. It is endemic to Australia, where it occurs in Tasmania, Victoria and New South Wales.
