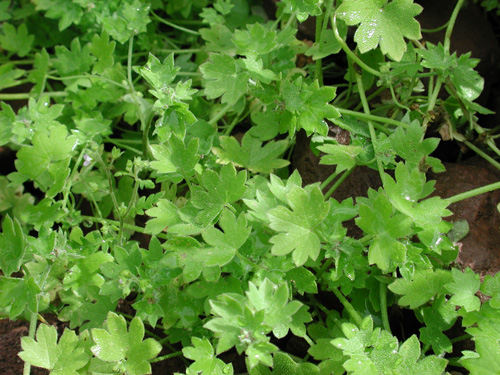
- Bowlesia incana

Scientific classification
- Kingdom: Plantae
- Clade: Tracheophytes
- Clade: Angiosperms
- Clade: Eudicots
- Clade: Asterids
- Order: Apiales
- Family: Apiaceae
- Subfamily: Azorelloideae
- Genus: Bowlesia; Ruiz & Pav. (1794)

Species
- 16; see text

= Bowlesia =

Genus of flowering plants

Bowlesia is a genus of flowering plant in the family Apiaceae. It includes 16 species native to the subtropical Americas, ranging from Oregon to Florida and southeastern Mexico in North America, and from Ecuador and southeastern Brazil to southern Argentina and southern Chile in South America.

== Species ==
There are 16 species assigned to this genus:

- Bowlesia argenticaulis Mathias & Constance
- Bowlesia flabilis J.F.Macbr.
- Bowlesia hieronymusii H.Wolff
- Bowlesia incana Ruiz & Pav.
- Bowlesia lobata Ruiz & Pav.
- Bowlesia macrophysa Zoellner
- Bowlesia palmata Ruiz & Pav.
- Bowlesia paposana I.M.Johnst.
- Bowlesia platanifolia H.Wolff
- Bowlesia ruiz-lealii Mathias & Constance
- Bowlesia setigera H.Wolff
- Bowlesia sodiroana H.Wolff
- Bowlesia tenella Meyen
- Bowlesia tropaeolifolia Gillies & Hook.
- Bowlesia uncinata Colla
- Bowlesia venturii Mathias & Constance
