= European Association for Japanese Studies =

The European Association for Japanese Studies (EAJS or ヨーロッパ日本研究協会 ヨーロッパにほんけんきゅうきょうかい) was established in 1973 by European scholars in order to facilitate academic exchange in the field of Japanese studies within Europe.

Since 1976, conferences have been organised almost every three years.

All the activities of EAJS are mainly supported by the Japan Foundation, the Toshiba International Foundation, as well as some private funds.

== Sections ==
Each conference is divided into specialist sections with convenors for each one. For 2011 the ten sections were:

- Urban and Environmental Studies
- Language and Linguistics
- Literature
- Visual and Performing Arts
- Anthropology and Sociology
- Economics, Business and Political Economy
- History
- Religion and History of Ideas
- Politics and International Relations
- Translating and Teaching Japanese

== Conferences ==
- 2021, Ghent / Belgium (held online)
- 2017, Lisbon / Portugal
- 2014, Ljubljana / Slovenia
- 2011, Tallinn / Estonia
- 2008, Lecce / Italy
- 2005, Vienna / Austria
- 2003, Warsaw / Poland
- 2000, Lahti / Finland
- 1997, Budapest / Hungary
- 1994, Copenhagen / Denmark
- 1991, Berlin / Germany
- 1988, Durham / UK
- 1985, Paris / France
- 1982, The Hague / Netherlands
- 1979, Florence / Italy
- 1976, Zurich / Switzerland
- 1973, Oxford, London / UK (1st)

== Current president ==
- 2017-2020 Andrej BEKEŠ, University of Ljubljana

== Past presidents ==
- 2014-2017 Bjarke Frellesvig, University of Oxford
- 2011-2014 Rein Raud, Helsinki University
- 2008-2011 Harald Fuess, Heidelberg University
- 2005–2008 Viktoria Eschbach-Szabo, Tübingen University
- 2003–2005 Brian Powell, Oxford University
- 2000–2003 Joseph Kyburz, CNRS Paris
- 1997–2000 Peter Kornicki, Cambridge University
- 1994–1997 Irmela Hijiya-Kirschnereit, Freie Universitaet Berlin
- 1991–1994 Adriana Boscaro, Venice University
- 1988–1991 Sepp Linhart, Vienna University
- 1985–1988 Ian Nish, London School of Economics
- 1982–1985 Olof Lidin, Copenhagen University
- 1979–1982 Charles Dunn, SOAS London
- 1976–1979 Joseph Kreiner, Bonn University
- 1975–1976 Joseph Kreiner, Bonn University
- 1973–1974 Patrick O'Neill, London University
