= Bulletin of the National Museum of Japanese History =

- Discipline: Japanese history
- Language: Japanese

Publication details
- History: 1982-present
- Publisher: National Museum of Japanese History (Japan)

Standard abbreviations
- ISO 4: Bull. Natl. Mus. Jpn. Hist.

Indexing
- ISSN: 0286-7400
- LCCN: 83648014
- OCLC no.: 10232352

Links
- Journal homepage

The Bulletin of the National Museum of Japanese History (国立歴史民俗博物館研究報告, Kokuritsu Rekishi Minzoku Hakubutsukan kenkyū hōkoku) is an academic journal of Japanese history, published by the National Museum of Japanese History. Several issues are published each year in Japanese, with summaries in English.

== See also ==
- Cultural Properties of Japan
