= Frederick Dickins =

British surgeon and orientalist

Frederick Dickins CB
- Born: Frederick Victor Dickins; May 24, 1838; Paddington, London
- Died: August 16, 1915 (aged 77)
- Occupations: naval surgeon; barrister; translator

Frederick Victor Dickins CB (24 May 1838 – 16 August 1915) was a British naval surgeon, barrister, orientalist and university administrator. He is now remembered as a translator of Japanese literature.

== Life ==
Dickins was born at 44 Connaught Terrace in Paddington, London to Thomas Dickins and Jane Dickins. He first visited Japan as a medical officer on HMS Coromandel in 1863. For three years he was stationed at Yokohama in charge of medical facilities there. During this time he was in contact with Japanese doctors and culture, and also Ernest Satow who became a lifelong correspondent and friend. He began publishing English translations of Japanese classical works at this time. He left his naval position, returned to England and tried various career choices, but came back to Japan in 1871, having in the meantime married and been called to the Bar. He built up a legal practice in Japan. In the María Luz case, he represented the Peruvian ship captain. He was also widely involved with botany, and journalism in the Yokohama community.

Dickins was especially interested in ferns which he collected at Yokohama and Atami, 1863–65. He sent both living plants and drawings back to Joseph Dalton Hooker at the Royal Botanic Gardens at Kew.

He returned to England in 1879. After practicing law in Egypt for a time, he mostly devoted himself to Japanese studies and administration in the University of London. He was appointed CB in the 1901 New Year Honours.

== Works ==
- The Collected Works of Frederick Victor Dickins (Bristol: Ganesha, Tokyo: Edition Synapse 1999) reprinted in seven volumes with an introduction by Peter Kornicki. ISBN 978-1-86210-003-9.
- Dickins co-authored a Life of Sir Harry Parkes with Stanley Lane-Poole. Lane-Poole wrote the first volume on Parkes in China, Dickins the second volume on Parkes in Japan.
- Dickins translated and edited Chiushingura, or the Loyal League. A Japanese Romance (1875).

== Letters to Dickins ==
- Sir Ernest Satow's Private Letters to W.G. Aston and F.V. Dickins edited by Ian Ruxton with an introduction by Peter Kornicki, Lulu Press Inc, February 2008. ISBN 978-1-4357-1000-9.

== Honours ==
In 1885, French botanist Adrien René Franchet in Nouv. Arch. Mus. Hist. Nat., séries 2, Vol.8 on page 244 published and described a plant from China. He named the genus Dickinsia in honour of Frederick Dickins.
