= Monumenta Nipponica =

- Discipline: Japanese studies
- Language: English
- Edited by: Bettina Gramlich-Oka

Publication details
- History: 1938-present
- Publisher: Sophia University (Japan)
- Frequency: Semiannual

Standard abbreviations
- ISO 4: Monum. Nippon.

Indexing
- ISSN: 0027-0741 (print); 1880-1390 (web)
- JSTOR: 00270741

Links
- Journal homepage

Monumenta Nipponica is a semi-annual academic journal of Japanese studies. Published by Sophia University (Tokyo), it is one of the oldest English-language academic journals in the field of Asian studies, being founded in 1938. Although the journal originally published articles in several languages, such as French, German, Spanish, and Italian, the journal has been published solely in English since early 1963. A series of 75 monographs were also published until 1986 under the Monumenta Nipponica name.

A symposium was held at Sophia University on October 6, 2018, to commemorate the 80-year anniversary of Monumenta Nipponica's founding. Videos of the symposium are available on YouTube. In 2020, Sophia University published a special issue commemorating Monumenta Nipponica's 80-year founding, showcasing the people who made the journal happen and noteworthy historical events.

== Contents ==
Each issue contains two to three main research articles, and around twenty reviews of recent books in Japanese studies, dealing with Japanese society, culture, history, religion, literature, art, anthropology, and related topics in Japanese and Asian studies. The journal occasionally publishes translations of Japanese-language works and English-language reviews of noteworthy books on Japanese studies that were published in other European languages, particularly German and French.

In addition to the printed journal, Monumenta Nipponica's content can be accessed via 3 websites.

- The list of all the issues and the titles of the articles and other content can be found at its Sophia University home page. Each item has a link for easy access at the appropriate hosting site.
- The most recent issue is available through Project MUSE. They also host back issues starting with volume 60, which was published in 2005.
- The majority of Monumenta Nipponica's back issues, from 1938 up to 5 years before the most recent issue, are accessible through JSTOR.

== Editors-in Chief ==
The following persons have been editors-in-chief of Monumenta Nipponica:

- Vols. 1–6 (1938–1943)—Johannes B. Kraus (founder)
- Vols. 7–16 (1951–1961)—Wilhelm Schiffer
- Vols. 17–18 (1962–1963)—Wilhelm Schiffer, Francis Mathy
- Vols. 19–23 (1964–1968)—Joseph Pittau
- Vols. 24–25 (1969–1970)—Edmund R. Skrzypczak
- Vols. 26–52:1 (1971–1997)—Michael Cooper
- Vols. 52:2–65:1 (1997–2010)—Kate Wildman Nakai
- Vols. 65:2–67:2 (2010–2012)—Mark R. Mullins
- Vols. 68:1–69:2 (2013–2014)—Richard A. Gardner, Caroline Hirasawa
- Vols. 70:1–70:2 (2015)—Richard A. Gardner, Bettina Gramlich-Oka
- Vols. 71:1–72:2 (2016–2017)—Bettina Gramlich-Oka, Sven Saaler
- Vols. 73:1–77:2 (2018–2023)—Bettina Gramlich-Oka
- Vols. 78:1–78:2 (2023)—Angela Yiu
- Vols. 79:1– (2024–present)—Edward R. Drott
