= Social Science Japan Journal =

- Discipline: economics law political science history sociology anthropology
- Language: English

Publication details
- History: 1998 – present
- Publisher: Oxford University Press (United Kingdom)
- Frequency: Semiannual

Standard abbreviations
- ISO 4: Soc. Sci. Jpn. J.

Indexing
- ISSN: 1369-1465

Social Science Japan Journal (SSJJ) is a peer-reviewed scholarly journal covering Japan in social scientific perspective, semiannually published by Oxford University Press. SSJJ's editorial board is located at the Institute of Social Science, the University of Tokyo, and supported by the international advisory board members including Andrew Gordon (Harvard University), Carol Gluck (Columbia University), Jomo Kwame Sundaram (United Nations), and J. Victor Koschmann (Cornell University). SSJJ is listed in the Social Science Citation Index (SSCI), under the "Area Studies" category.
