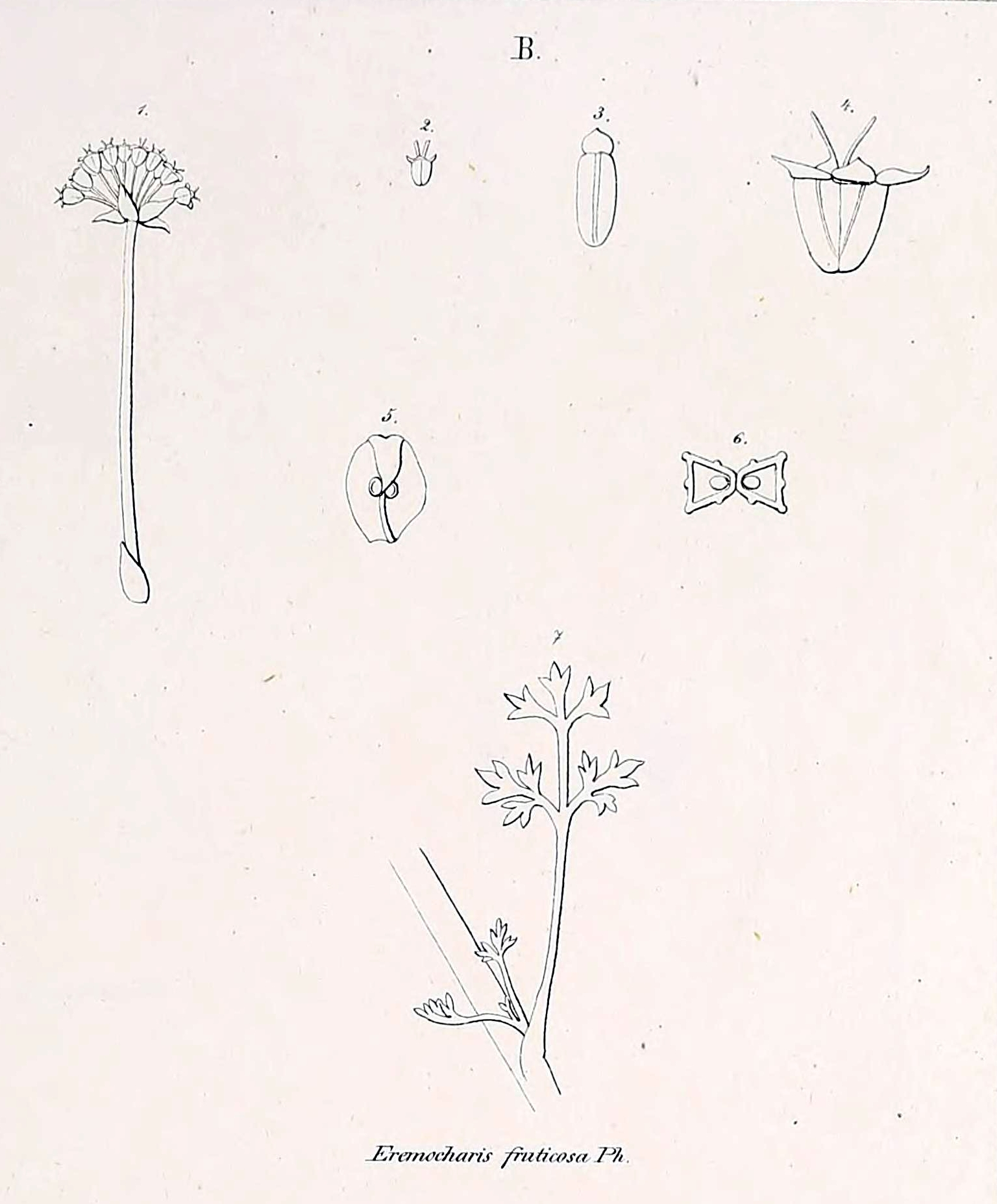
- Eremocharis fruticosa

Scientific classification
- Kingdom: Plantae
- Clade: Tracheophytes
- Clade: Angiosperms
- Clade: Eudicots
- Clade: Asterids
- Order: Apiales
- Family: Apiaceae
- Subfamily: Azorelloideae
- Genus: Eremocharis; Phil.

= Eremocharis (plant) =

Genus of plants

Eremocharis is a genus of flowering plants belonging to the family Apiaceae.

Its native range is Peru to Northern Chile.

Species:

- Eremocharis confinis I.M.Johnst.
- Eremocharis ferreyrae Mathias & Constance
- Eremocharis fruticosa Phil.
- Eremocharis hutchisonii Mathias & Constance
- Eremocharis integrifolia Mathias & Constance
- Eremocharis longiramea (H.Wolff) I.M.Johnst.
- Eremocharis piscoensis Mathias & Constance
- Eremocharis tripartita (H.Wolff) Mathias & Constance
- Eremocharis triradiata (H.Wolff) I.M.Johnst.
