= British Association for Japanese Studies =

The British Association for Japanese Studies, BAJS, is an association at Essex University in the United Kingdom promoting studies in Japan. Founded in 1974, it is a member of the Japan Library Group and awards the annual Morris Memorial Award.

It is principally sponsored by Toshiba and the Japan Foundation.

Japan Forum is the official journal of the BJS.
