= Treaty of Peace, Amity and Commerce between Portugal and Japan (1860) =

The Treaty of Amity and Commerce between Japan and Portugal (日葡修好通商条約, Nichiro Shūkō Tsūshō Jōyaku - Tratado de Paz, Amizade e Commercio, entre Sua Magestade El Rei de Portugal e Sua Magestade o Imperador do Japão) was signed between Portugal and the Tokugawa Shogunate in Edo (now Tokyo) on August 3, 1860. It opened diplomatic relations and trade between the two countries.

== Historical Background ==
The first encounters between Japan and Portuguese citizens date back to the early 1540s, when Portuguese explorers arrived on the Japanese island of Tanegashima. Trade between the two countries developed during the 17th century (so-called Nanban trade) until the Portuguese and other Christian nations were expelled from Japan in 1639 after the Shimabara Rebellion, leaving the Netherlands as only Western nation with formal trade relations with Japan (Sakoku period).

After an initial convention between the United States and Japan in 1854 (Convention of Kanagawa), the United States, the Netherlands, Russia, Great Britain and France succeeded each in concluding a treaty of amity and commerce with Japan in 1858, the so-called Ansei Treaties. These treaties formally allowed for international trade in specific Japanese ports and cities. The Treaty between Portugal and Japan of 1860 was the sixth treaty of that kind between a Western nation and Japan.

== Negotiations ==
Before the Netherlands could conclude their Treaty of Amity and Commerce with Japan in 1858, the Dutch had obtained three other conventions with Japan in 1854-1857. One of them was the "Additional Articles concluded between Japan and the Netherlands" on 16 October 1857 at Nagasaki. In its appendix, the Japanese Government stated that it had no objections against a similar treaty with the Kingdom of Portugal, if such was desired by that country. Early March 1858, the Dutch Cabinet decided to notify the Portuguese Government about the Japanese decision.

On 9 July 1860, the Dutch Commissioner Donker Curtius paid an official visit to the Shogunate in Edo. Curtius reminded the Japanese Government of its promise of 1857, and asked whether Japan would conclude a treaty with Portugal. The Japanese Government replied positively.

Three days later, on 12 July 1860, Isidoro Francisco Guimarães, Governor of Macao and Portuguese Plenipotentiary, arrived in the Bay of Edo, on board of the Portuguese corvette Dom João I. He took up residence with the British Minister at Edo, Rutherford Alcock. It took the Portuguese Envoy only 3 weeks to conclude a treaty with Japan. During the negotiations, Guimarães aimed for a reduction of the Japanese import tariff of 35% on wine, but this concession was refused by the Shogunate.

The Shogunate was also keen to emphasize that the Portuguese Treaty was the result of the promise made to the Dutch in 1857, and did not constitute a precedent for treaties with other countries, being aware of the opposition within Japan against the Ansei Treaties.

== Signing and ratification ==
The Treaty of Amity and Commerce between Portugal and Japan was officially signed on 3 August 1860 in Edo by Isidoro Francisco Guimarães for Portugal, and Mizuguchi Sanuki no kami (溝口讃岐守), Sakai Oki no kami (酒井隠岐守) and Matsudaira Jirobe (松平次郎兵衛) for the Shogunate. The exchange of the ratifications took place on April 8, 1862, at Edo.

== Description ==
The most important articles of the Portuguese-Japanese Treaty of 1860 are as follows:

- Establishment of diplomatic relations (art. 2)
- Opening of the Japanese ports of Nagasaki, Hakodate and Kanagawa for Portuguese citizens on 1 October 1860, Hyogo (January 1, 1863), Niigata or another port at the west coast of Japan (once the port decided), and the cities of Edo (January 1, 1862), and Osaka (January 1, 1863) (art. 3)
- Introduction of extraterritorial rights for Portuguese citizens in Japan (art. 4 and art. 5)
- Freedom of religion for Portuguese citizens in Japan (art. 9)
- Introduction of preferential Japanese import tariffs (art. 14)
- Introduction of a clause of most favoured nation (art. 23)

The first Portuguese Consul in Japan was José Loureiro, Representative of the Company Dent & Co. in Yokohama, who took up the consular position in 1860.

== See also ==
- Japan–Portugal relations
- Treaty of Amity and Commerce (United States-Japan) on July 29, 1858
- 1858 Treaty of Amity and Commerce between the Netherlands and Japan on August 18, 1858
- Anglo-Japanese Treaty of Amity and Commerce on August 26, 1858
- Treaty of Amity and Commerce between France and Japan on October 9, 1858
- Treaty of Amity and Commerce between Prussia and Japan on January 24, 1861
