= 1858 Treaty of Amity and Commerce between the Netherlands and Japan =

One of the Ansei Treaties

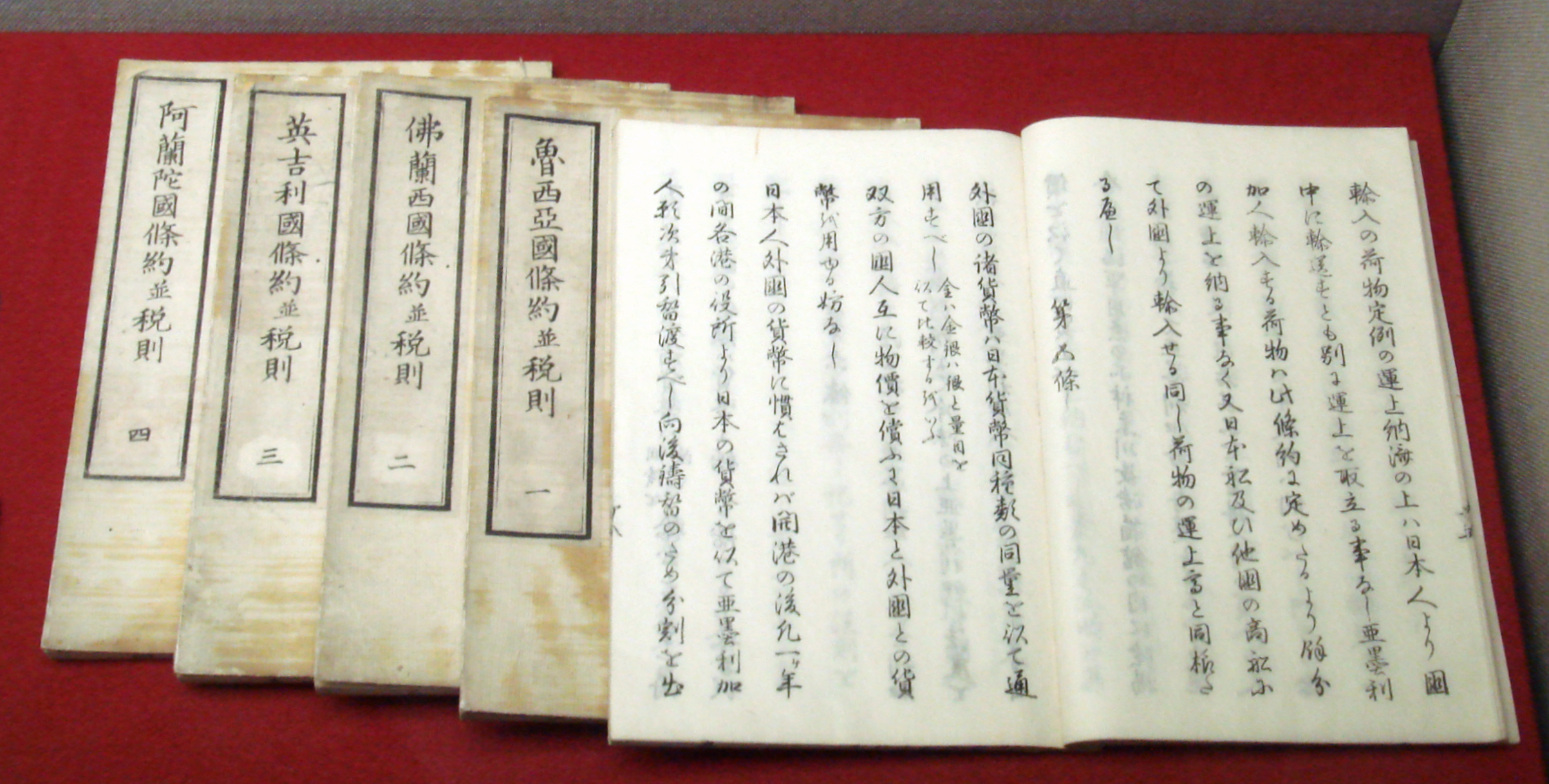
Treaties of Amity and Commerce between Japan and the Netherlands, England, France, Russia, and the United States, 1858.

The Treaty of Amity and Commerce between Japan and the Netherlands (日蘭修好通商条約, Nichiran Shūkō Tsūshō Jōyaku) was signed between the Netherlands and Tokugawa Shogunate in Edo (now Tokyo) on August 18, 1858. It opened several Japanese ports and cities for Dutch trade and confirmed extraterritoriality to Dutch nationals in Japan. It was one of the so-called Ansei Treaties.

== Background ==
On 31 March 1854, the United States of America succeeded in concluding a treaty with the Japanese Shogunate, called the Convention of Kanagawa or Perry Treaty. As a consequence, the US had the right to establish a consulate in the coastal town of Shimoda. The first US Consul at Shimoda was Townsend Harris, who arrived in Shimoda on 21 August 1856. Great Britain succeeded in concluding a similar convention with the Shogunate on 14 October 1854. Russia concluded a treaty with Japan on 7 February 1855. The Russian Treaty bore basic elements of extraterritoriality for both Russian nationals in Japan and Japanese nationals in Russia.

The Dutch established formal trade relations with Japan in 1609. From 1639, they became the only Western country allowed to do trade with Japan. From 1641 onwards, they were confined to Dejima, a small man-made island in the Bay of Nagasaki. Confronted with the advance of other Western powers in East Asia, the Dutch in vain tried to induce Japan to negotiate a treaty with them in 1844. However, they succeeded in signing a temporary agreement with the Japanese government on 9 November 1855, which was transformed into a formal treaty on 30 January 1856. It had 28 articles, considerably more than the US-Japan Convention of Kanagawa (12 articles) or the Convention between Japan and Great Britain of 1854 (7 articles). Article 2 even ensured the right of extraterritoriality for Dutch citizens in Japan. The Netherlands and Russia each signed a supplementary treaty with Japan, respectively on 16 and 24 October 1857, both in Nagasaki. These treaties gave them more detailed trading rights.

US Consul Townsend Harris observed the rather restrictive interpretation of the Kanagawa Treaty of 1854 by the Japanese authorities and concluded that his country should strive for a broader treaty of amity and commerce with Japan. On 29 July 1858, after months of patient negotiations by Harris, Japan and the United States signed a treaty of amity and commerce in Edo (current Tokyo). This Treaty did not only contain commercial rights for individual citizens, but elevated the relations between the two countries to a political level, introducing friendly diplomatic relations.

== Negotiations ==
On 23 April 1858, Janus Henricus Donker Curtius, Dutch Commissioner at Nagasaki, arrived in Edo to perform a ceremonial visit to the Shogun, which took place on 8 May 1858. During his stay in Edo, Curtius became aware of Harris' negotiations with the Shogunate for a treaty of amity and commerce. Curtius had negotiated the Convention of 1855, the Treaty of 1856 and the Supplementary Treaty of 1857 between Japan and the Netherlands, and was determined to open similar treaty negotiations with the Shogunate as Harris. However, Harris received assurances from the Shogunate that Japan would not sign any treaty or convention with another foreign power before the expiration of 30 days after the signing of a treaty with the United States.

Curtius remained in Edo for three months, during which he held treaty negotiations with the Shogunate. Despite objections from the Imperial Court in Kyoto against the draft treaty with the United States negotiated by Townsend Harris, Curtius succeeded in obtaining the agreement from the Shogunate for a draft treaty between Japan and the Netherlands in August 1858, after which he left for Nagasaki.

== Signing and ratification ==
The Treaty of Amity and Commerce between the Netherlands and Japan was officially signed on 18 August 1858 in Edo by J.H. Donker Curtius for the Netherlands, and Nagai Genbato, Okabe Suruga no kami and Iwase Higo no kami for the Shogunate. The Treaty entered into force on 4 July 1859. The Dutch Government ratified the treaty on 24 December 1858. The exchange of the ratifications took place on 1 March 1860, at Dejima.

== Description ==
The most important articles of the Dutch-Japanese Treaty of 1858 are as follows:

- Establishment of diplomatic relations (art. 1)
- Additional to Nagasaki and Hakodate, opening of following Japanese ports or cities for Dutch citizens: Kanagawa (July 4, 1859), Hyogo (January 1, 1863), a port at the west coast of Japan (January 1, 1860), Edo (January 1, 1862), and Osaka (January 1, 1863) (art. 2)
- Introduction of preferential Japanese import tariffs (art. 3)
- Confirmation of extraterritorial rights for Dutch citizens in Japan (art. 5)
- Freedom of religion for Dutch citizens in Japan (art. 7)
- Introduction of a clause of most favoured nation (art. 9)

The first Dutch Consul-General in Japan was Jan Karel de Wit. He took up his position on 28 February 1860 and was based in Dejima, Nagasaki

== See also ==
- Japan-Netherlands Relations
- Treaty of Amity and Commerce (United States-Japan) on July 29, 1858
- Anglo-Japanese Treaty of Amity and Commerce on August 26, 1858
- Treaty of Amity and Commerce between France and Japan on October 9, 1858
- Treaty of Peace, Amity and Commerce between Portugal and Japan on August 3, 1860
- Treaty of Amity and Commerce between Prussia and Japan on January 24, 1861
