= Treaty of Amity and Commerce between France and Japan =

1858 treaty between France and Japan

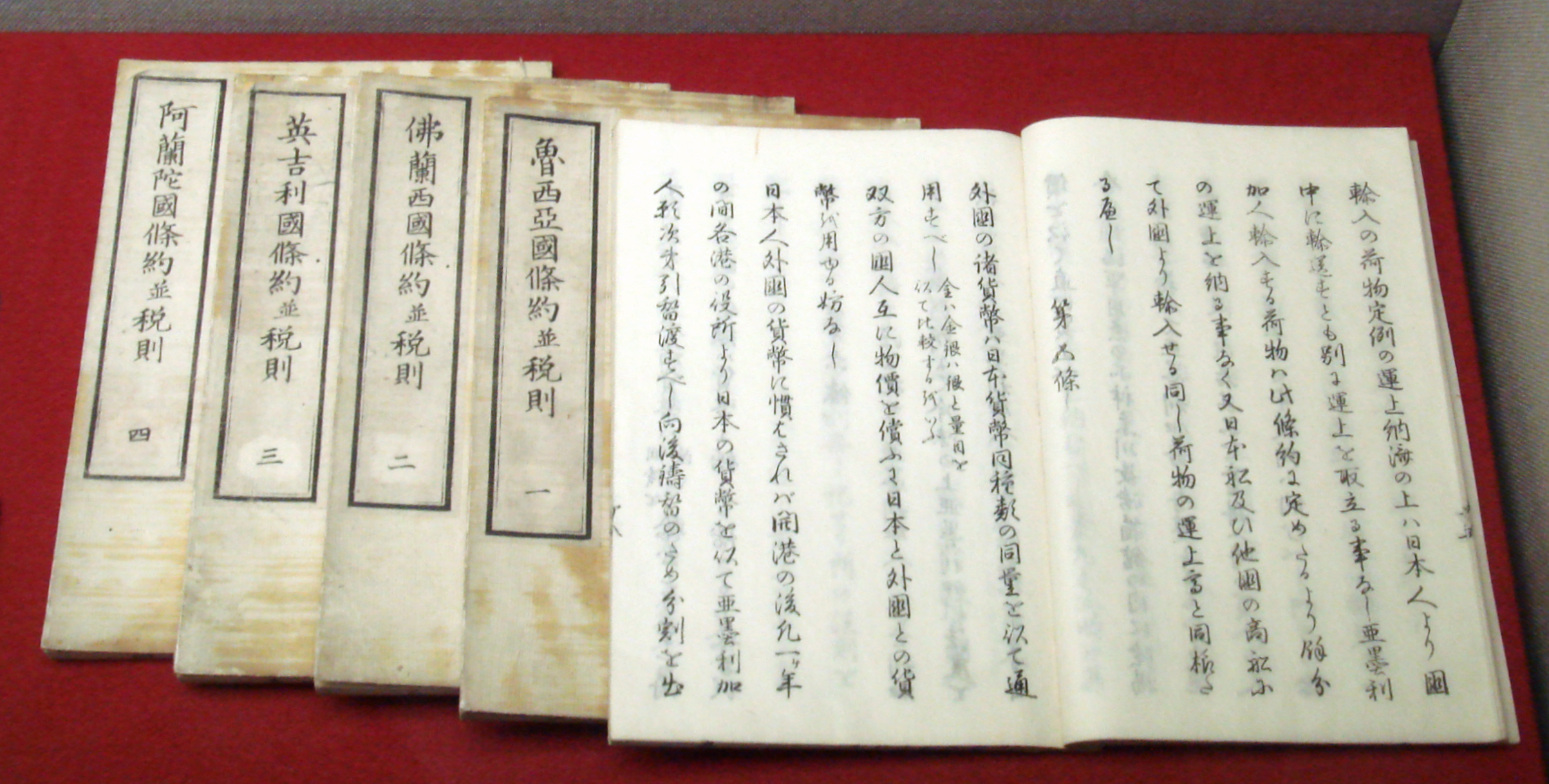
Treaties of Amity and Commerce between Japan and Holland, Britain, France, Russia and the United States, 1858.

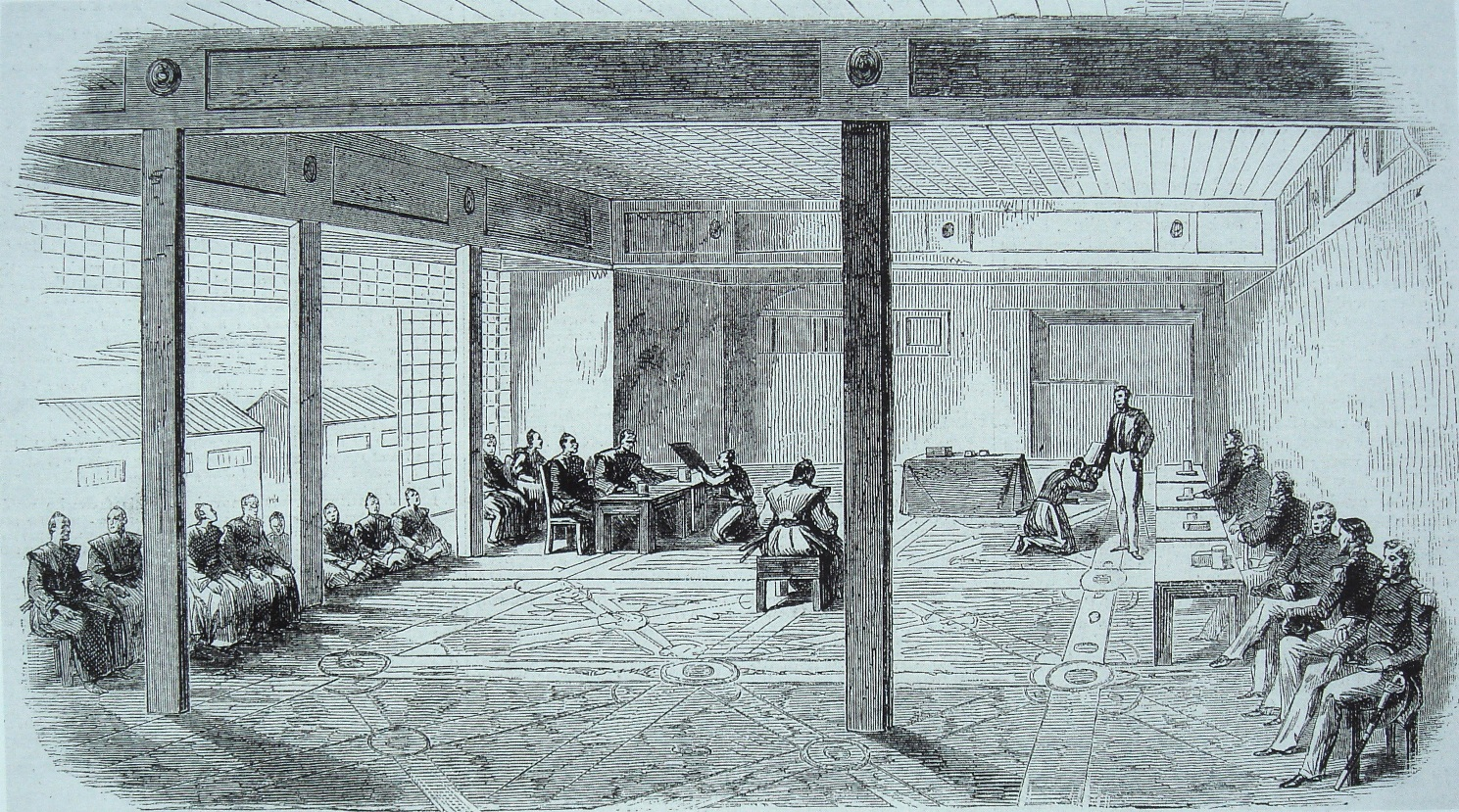
Signature of the First Franco-Japanese treaty in 1858 in Edo.

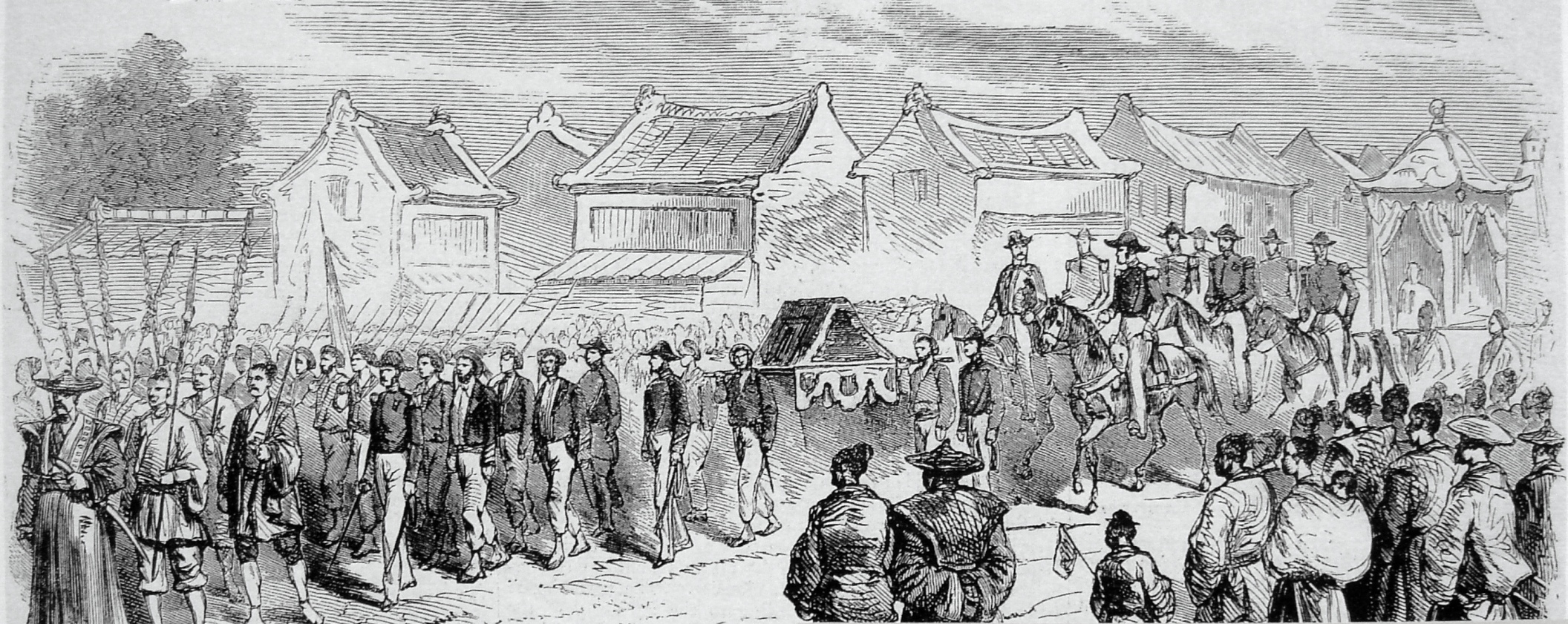
Duchesne de Bellecourt, bringing the ratified Franco-Japanese Treaty to the shōgun, February 4, 1860.

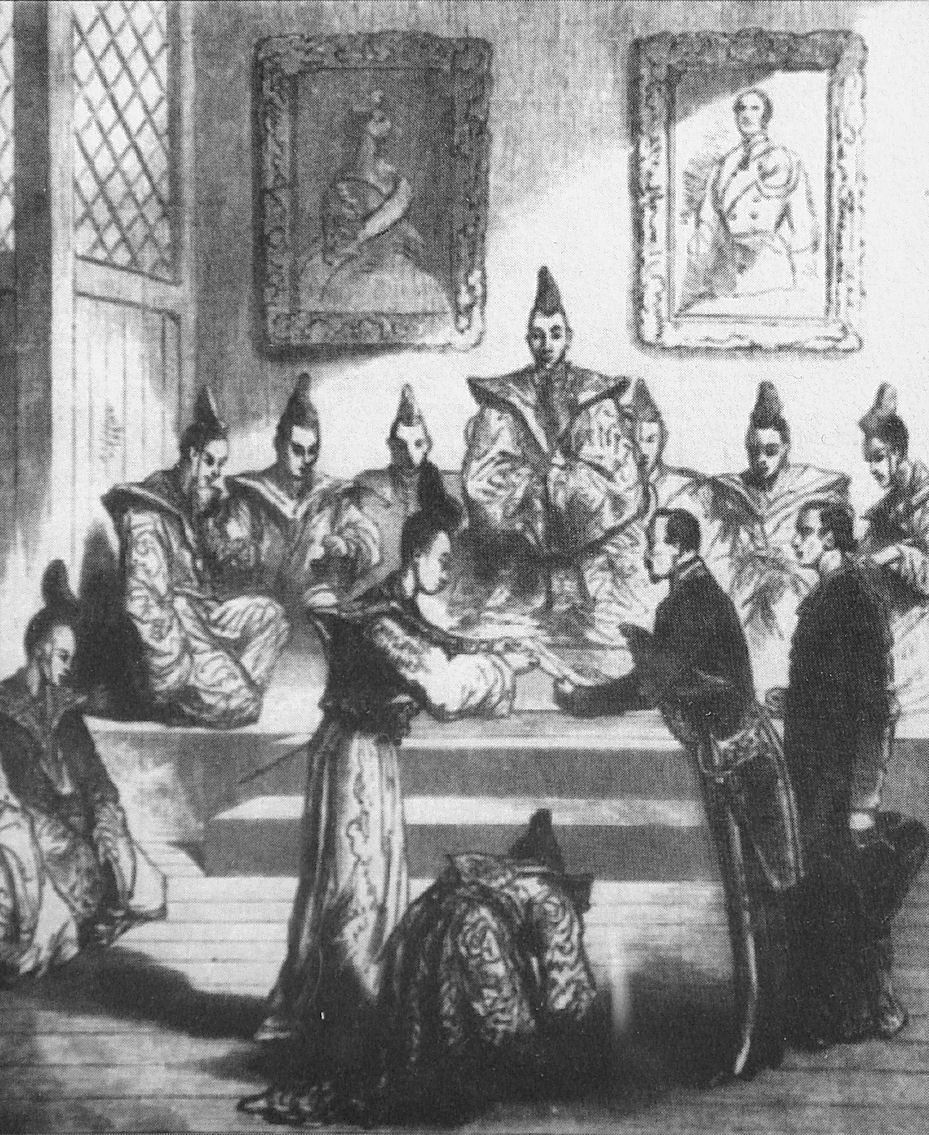
Duchesne de Bellecourt remitting the ratified Treaty of Amity and Commerce between France and Japan to the shōgun in 1860. He is accompanied by Father Mermet-Cachon.

The Treaty of Amity and Commerce between France and Japan (Japanese: 日仏修好通商条約) (1858) opened diplomatic relations and trade between the two counties.

== Description ==
The treaty was signed in Edo on October 9, 1858, by Jean-Baptiste Louis Gros, the commander of the French expedition in China, assisted by Charles de Chassiron and Alfred de Moges, opening diplomatic relations between the two countries. The Treaty was signed following the signature of the Harris Treaty between the United States and Japan, as France, Russia, Great Britain, and Holland quickly followed the American example: Japan was forced to apply to other nations the conditions granted to the United States under the "most favoured nation" provision. These 1858 treaties with the five nations are known collectively as "Ansei Treaties". The most important points of these Unequal Treaties were:

- exchange of diplomatic agents.
- Edo, Kobe, Nagasaki, Niigata, and Yokohama’s opening to foreign trade as ports.
- ability of foreign citizens to live and trade at will in those ports (only opium trade was prohibited).
- a system of extraterritoriality that provided for the subjugation of foreign residents to the laws of their own consular courts instead of the Japanese law system.
- fixed low import-export duties, subject to international control, thus depriving the Japanese government control of foreign trade and protection of national industries (the rate would go as low as 5% in the 1860s.)

In 1859, Gustave Duchesne de Bellecourt arrived and became the first French representative in Japan. A French Consulate was opened that year at the Temple of Saikai-ji, in Mita, Edo, at the same time as an American Consulate was established at the Temple of Zenpuku-ji, and a British Consulate at the Temple of Tōzen-ji.

The ratified Treaty was brought to the shōgun by Duchesne de Bellecourt, on February 4, 1860.

== See also ==
- List of Ambassadors from France to Japan
- France-Japan relations (19th century)
- Treaty of Commerce and Navigation between Japan and Russia, 7 February 1855.
- Treaty of Amity and Commerce (United States-Japan) on July 29, 1858.
- Treaty of Amity and Commerce between the Netherlands and Japan on August 18, 1858.
- Treaty of Amity and Commerce between Russia and Japan on August 19, 1858.
- Anglo-Japanese Treaty of Amity and Commerce on August 26, 1858.
- Treaty of Peace, Amity and Commerce between Portugal and Japan on August 3, 1860
- Treaty of Amity and Commerce between Prussia and Japan on January 24, 1861.
