= Japan–Portugal relations =

Bilateral relations between Japan and Portugal

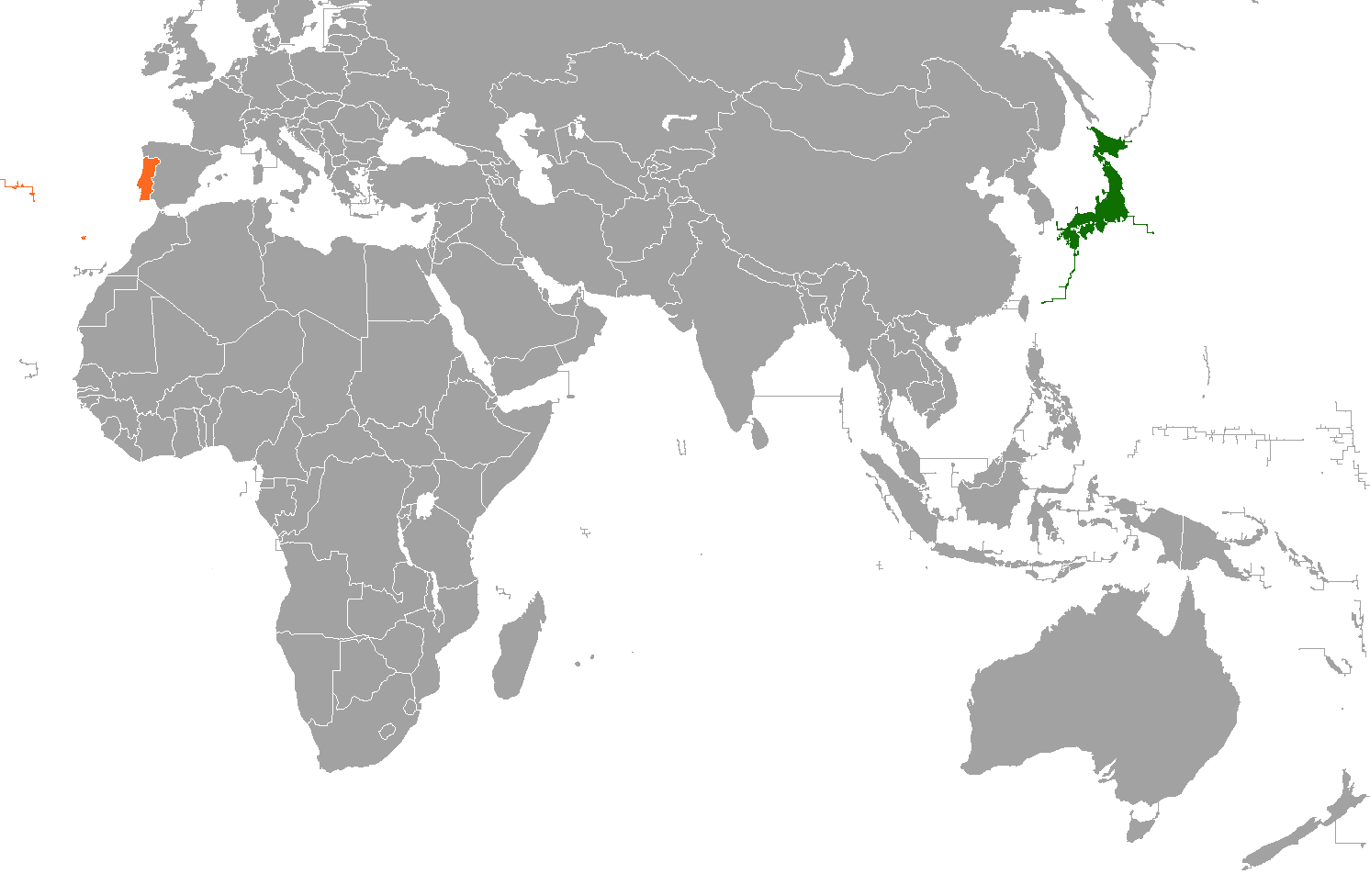
- Japan: Portugal

Japan–Portugal relations are the current and historical diplomatic, cultural and trade relations between Japan and Portugal. The history of relations between the two nations goes back to the mid-16th century, when Portuguese sailors first arrived in Japan in 1543, and diplomatic relations officially restarted in the 19th century with the Treaty of Peace, Amity and Commerce.

The Portuguese were the first Europeans to reach Japan, blown ashore the Ōsumi Archipelago, in the Tanegashima island. During the 16th century, upon first contact with the Japanese, Firearms and other technological advancements were introduced, leading to mercantilism, known as Nanban trade, having subsequently shaped the unification of Japan and economic development during the Sengoku and early Edo periods. The Portuguese legacy in Japan, among many, includes depictions of the East and West in Nanban art, with subsequent influences in gastronomy, such as tempura, in language, reflected in several dozen Portuguese loanwords in the Japanese language, geography, religion and everyday culture. The Portuguese heritage in Japan is still present in the consciousness of modern Japanese society.

Both nations are members of the World Trade Organization. Since 2014 Japan has had associate observer status in the Community of Portuguese Language Countries. In 2016, 440 Japanese citizens were registered in Portugal and 589 Portuguese were registered in Japan. Japan has an embassy in Lisbon. Portugal has an embassy in Tokyo.

== History ==
=== 16th century ===
==== Trade and commerce ====
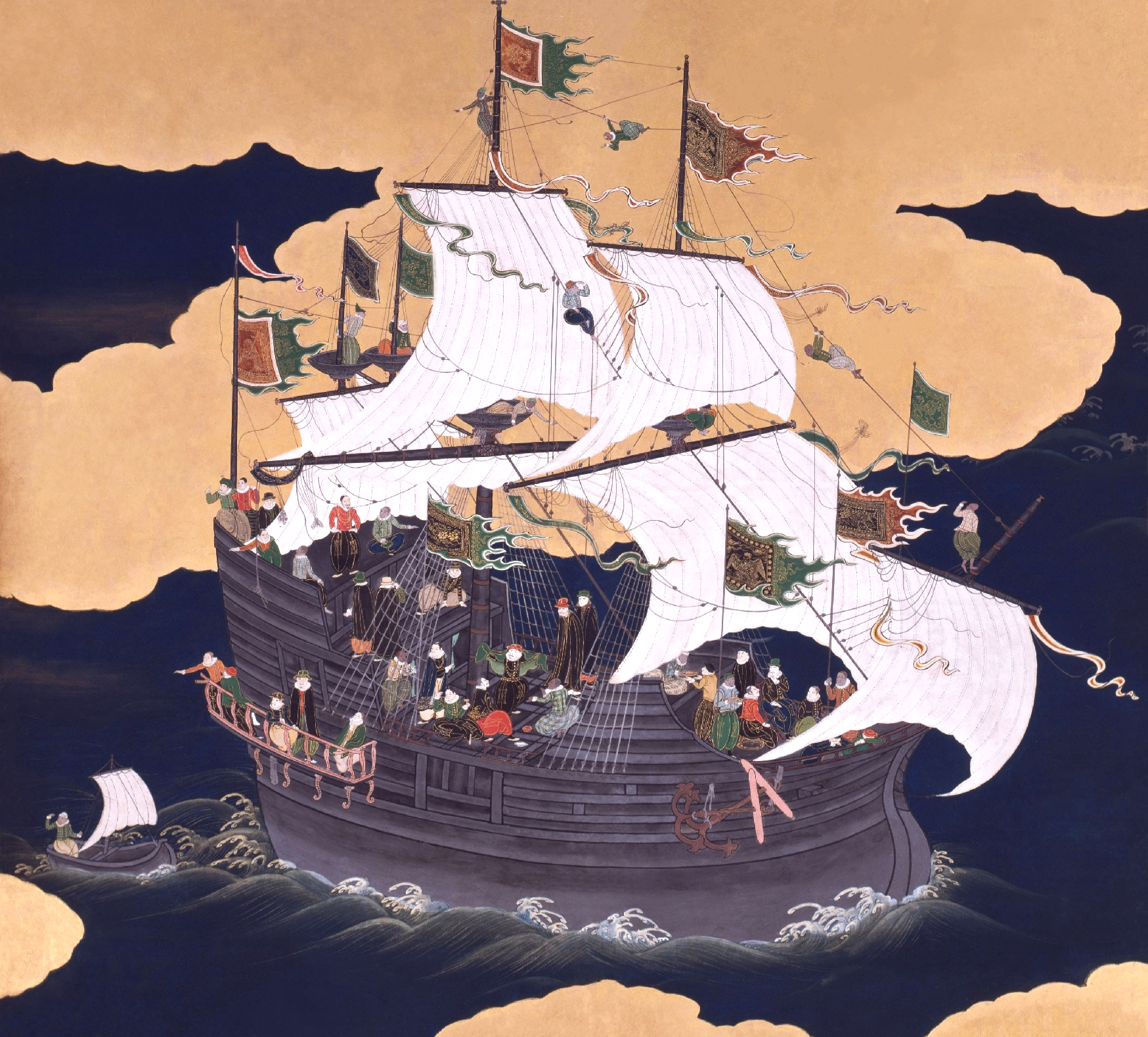
Portuguese trading ship in Nagasaki, depicted in Nanban art.

The first affiliation between Portugal and Japan started in 1543, when Portuguese explorers landed in the southern archipelago of Japan, becoming the first Europeans to reach Japan. They arrived on Tanegashima, ruled by Tanegashima Tokitaka, who quickly acquired Portuguese firearms and ordered local smiths to copy them, beginning the spread of guns throughout Japan. As soon as the first Portuguese arrived in 1543, Portuguese traders and merchants began looking for trading opportunities in Japan. This period of time is often entitled Nanban trade, where both Portuguese and Japanese would engage in mercantilism and cultural exchange.

The Portuguese at this time would found the port of Nagasaki, through the initiative of the Jesuit Gaspar Vilela and the Daimyo lord Ōmura Sumitada, in 1571, where the annual trade ships arrived from then on. Sumitada, who converted to Christianity in 1563, was the first daimyō to do so and strongly supported Portuguese trade and Jesuit missionary activity. In 1580 he granted Nagasaki to the Jesuits, helping make it the principal Portuguese trading center in Japan.

The expansion for commerce extended Portuguese influence in Japan, particularly in Kyushu, where the port became a strategic hot spot after the Portuguese assistance to Daimyo Sumitada on repelling an attack on the harbor by the Ryūzōji clan in 1578. Portuguese influence in Kyushu was also strengthened through alliance with the powerful Christian daimyō Ōtomo Sōrin, who welcomed missionaries and merchants into his domains. Sōrin converted to Christianity in 1578 under the name Dom Francisco and became one of the leading supporters of Portuguese interests in Japan.

The cargo of the first Portuguese ships (called kurofune, "Black Ships", by the Japanese) upon docking in Japan were basically cargo coming from China (silk, porcelain, etc.). The Japanese craved these goods, which were prohibited from contacts with the Chinese by the Emperor as punishment for the attacks of the Wokou piracy. Thus, the Portuguese acted as intermediaries in the Asian trade. Many products and cultural aspects flowed into the Japanese market from Portugal, while silver and other goods from Japan circulated into the Portuguese kingdom.

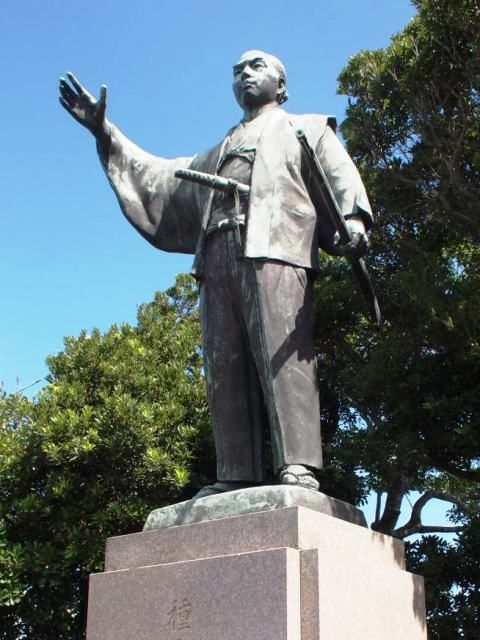
Tanegashima Tokitaka, head of Tanegashima clan

In 1592 the Portuguese trade with Japan started being increasingly challenged by Chinese smugglers on their reeds, in addition to Spanish vessels coming to Manila in 1600, the Dutch in 1609, and English in 1613.

One of the many things that the Japanese were interested in were Portuguese guns. With the arrival of the first Europeans in Japan in 1543, Portuguese traders António Mota, Francisco Zeimoto disembarked in Tanegashima, where they introduced firearms to the local population. These muskets would later be known as Tanegashima, receiving the name after its location.

Because Japan was in the midst of a civil war, an era marked by the Sengoku period, the Japanese heavily purchased Portuguese artillery, such as guns (arquebus) and cannons (breech-loading swivel gun), and adopted Portuguese full plated armour, opposed to tight leather. Oda Nobunaga, a famous daimyō who nearly unified all of Japan, made extensive use of guns, which played a key role in the Battle of Nagashino in 1575. Nobunaga also tolerated Jesuit missionaries and Portuguese merchants, partly because they weakened the influence of Buddhist institutions hostile to him. Within a year, Japanese smiths were able to reproduce the mechanism and began to mass-produce the Portuguese firearms. Early issues due to Japanese inexperience were corrected with the help of Portuguese blacksmiths. The Japanese soon worked on various techniques to improve the effectiveness of their guns and even developed larger caliber barrels and ammunition to increase lethality. Within 50 years, Nobunaga's armies were equipped with a large number of such weapons, changing the way war was fought on the islands. These weapons played a key role in the unification of Japan under Toyotomi Hideyoshi and Tokugawa Ieyasu, as well as in the invasions of Korea in 1592 and 1597. Apart from weapons, the Portuguese also traded clocks, glass and glassware, soap, tobacco, and other unknown products, in addition, they introduced bread and wine and the cultivation of tomatos, bananas and pumpkins, etc. in Feudal Japan.

==== Jesuits in Japan ====
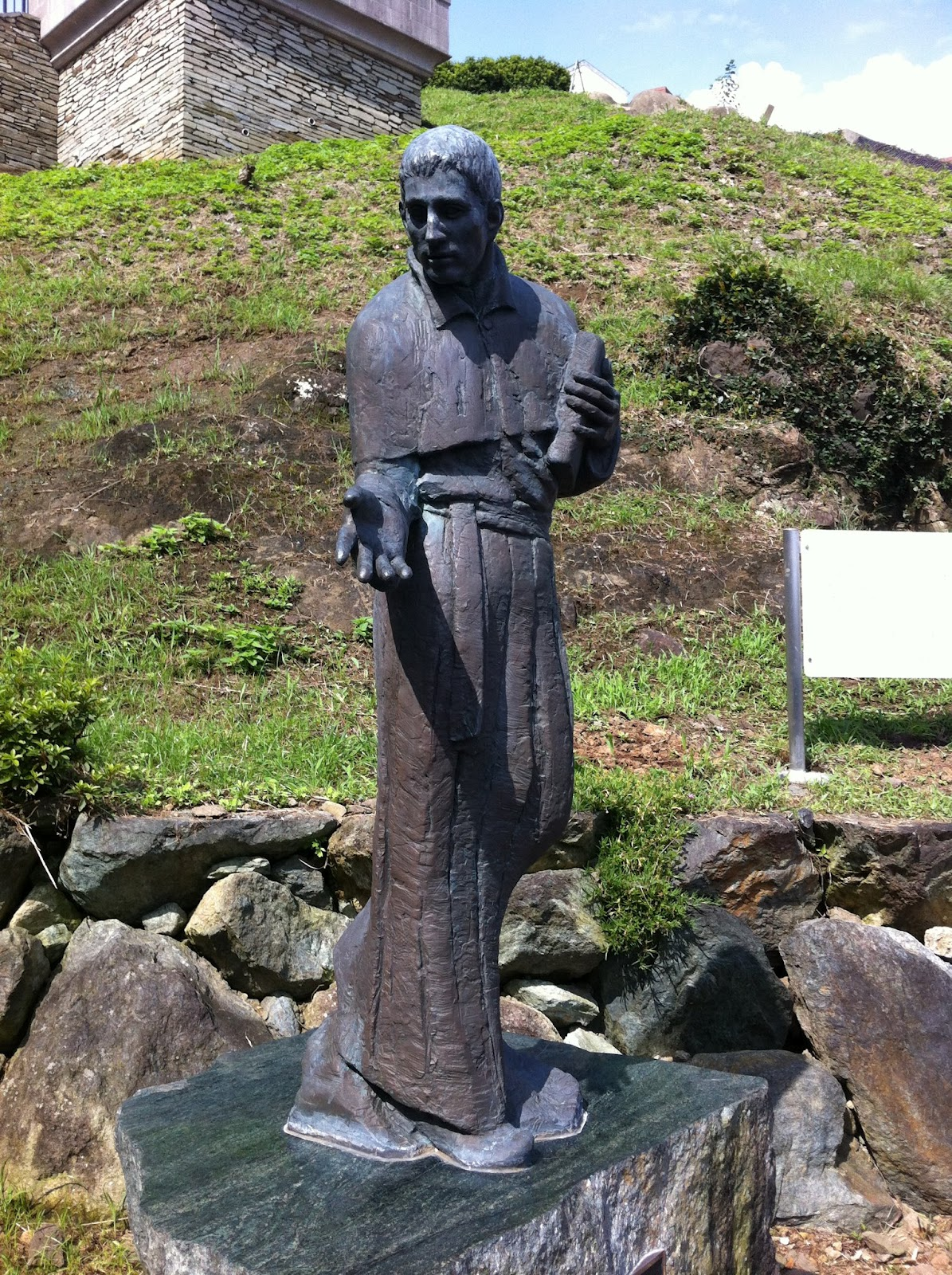
Luís Fróis, the first European Japanologist

While working in Malacca in December 1547, Francisco Xavier met Anjirō. A former samurai on the run for murder, Anjirō had heard about Xavier's work and left Japan specifically to learn Catholicism from him. The two became friends, exchanging knowledge of their cultures while working together for a year in Goa. Then, with Anjirō as his translator, Xavier traveled through Japan between 15 August 1549 and 15 November 1551, starting in Kagoshima. He laid the foundation for the Jesuits' missionary activity and thus introduced Christianity to Japan. Other Portuguese Jesuits like Francisco Cabral and Gaspar Coelho visited Japan in 1570 and continued to carry out Christian missionary activities in Kyushu, later leading several lords of the region to Christianize. Tenshō envoys were also sent to Europe in the late sixteenth century. The Jesuits initially missionized exclusively, then in competition with other Christian monastic orders, but also significantly promoted cultural, scientific, institutional, business and diplomatic exchange.

In addition to their religious activities, Portuguese merchants introduced a wide range of European cultural practices to Japan. They taught Western techniques in fields such as art, music, theater, and painting, and produced printed materials in Latin, Portuguese, and romanized Japanese, helping to disseminate European knowledge. Jesuit schools and workshops became centers for instruction in subjects including cartography, astronomy, medicine, metallurgy, Western-style military science, entertainment, and cuisine.

European leisure activities also took root in Japanese society during this period. Card games such as karuta, derived from Portuguese playing cards, later known as hanafuda developed into popular pastimes and eventually became embedded in Japanese cultural traditions. In culinary, the Jesuits cooking methods also influenced the development of tempura and nanbanzuke, which evolved into some of Japan’s iconic dishes. Local confectioners in Nagasaki also adopted Portuguese techniques to create sweets such as keiran somen (fios de ovos), konpeitō, and castella cake, all of which became enduring elements of Japanese gastronomy.

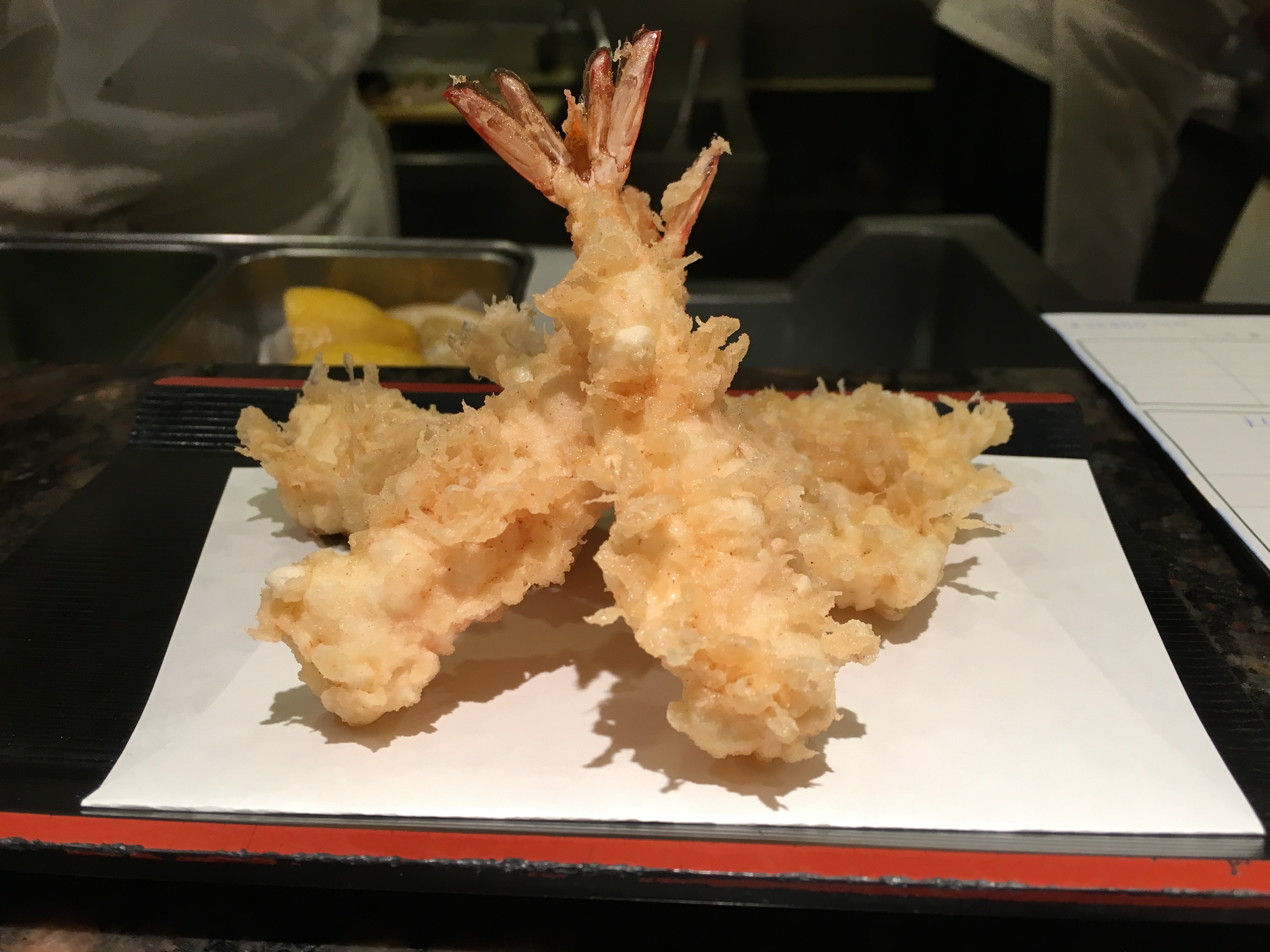
Tempura, a Japanese dish influenced by Portuguese frying techniques.

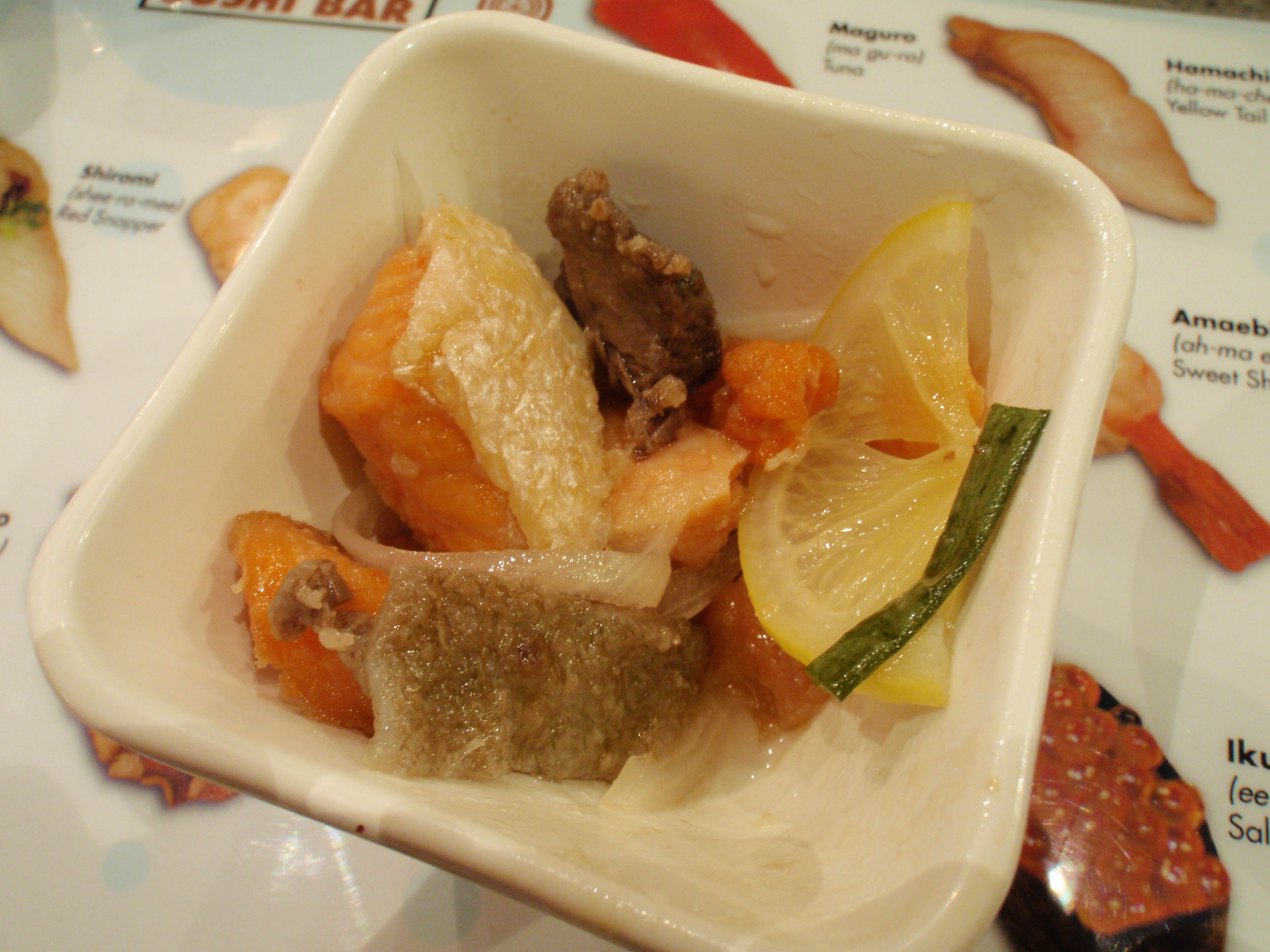
Nanbanzuke, a Japanese fried and pickled seafood variant of the Portuguese escabeche.

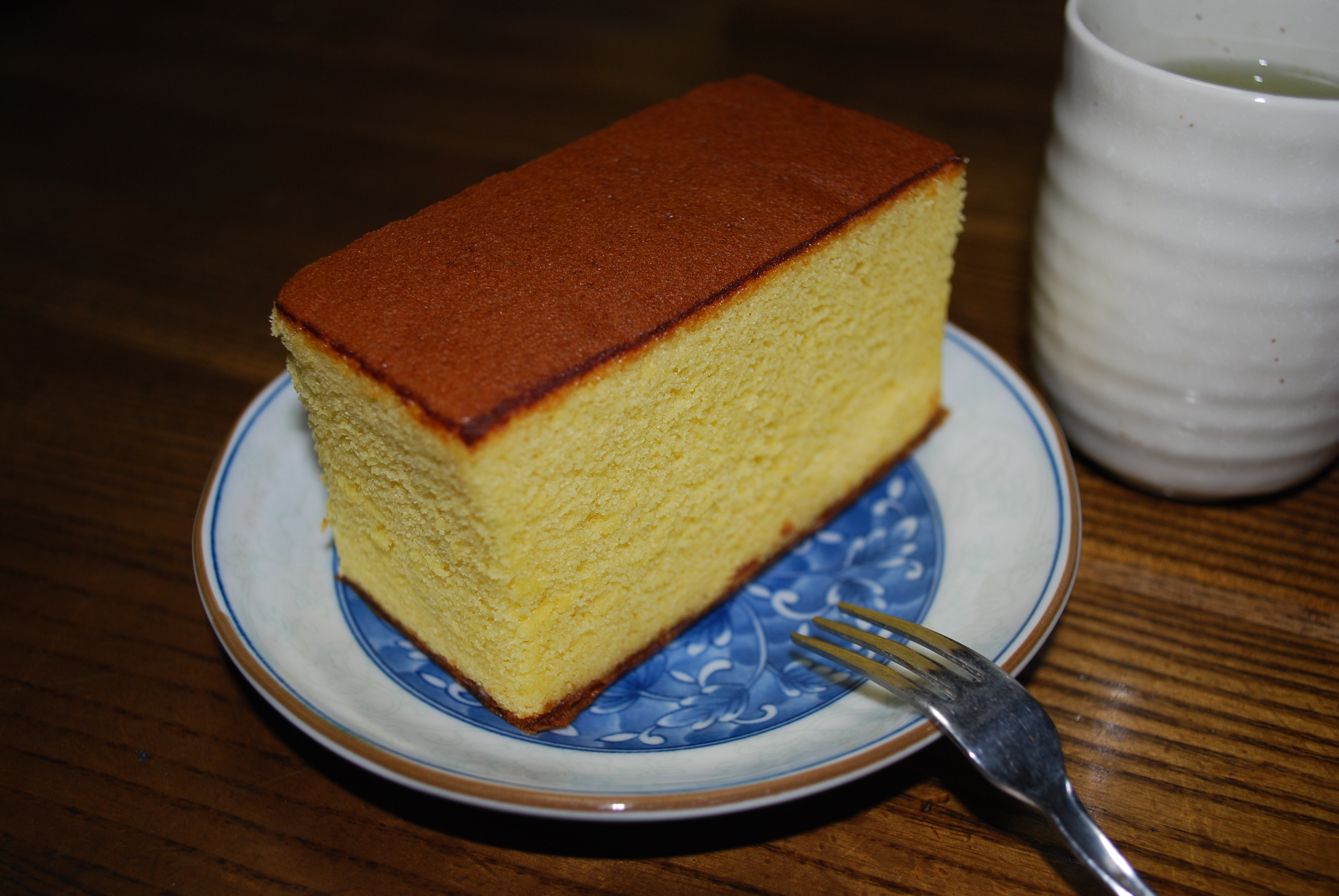
Castella, a sponge cake introduced by Portuguese missionaries.

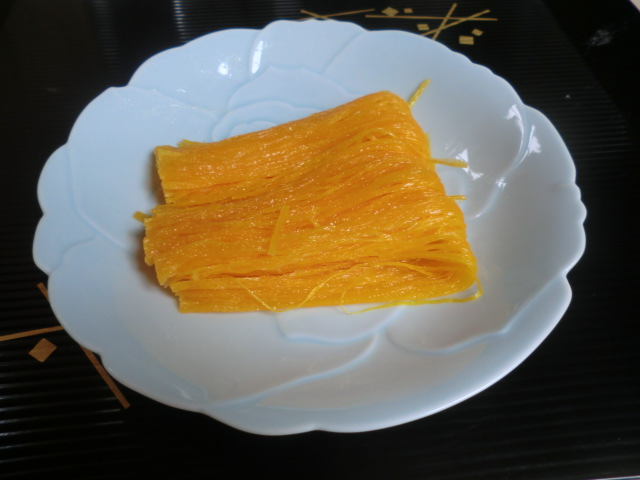
Keiran Sōmen (Fios de Ovos), a egg-yolk sweet derived from Portuguese Fios de Ovos.

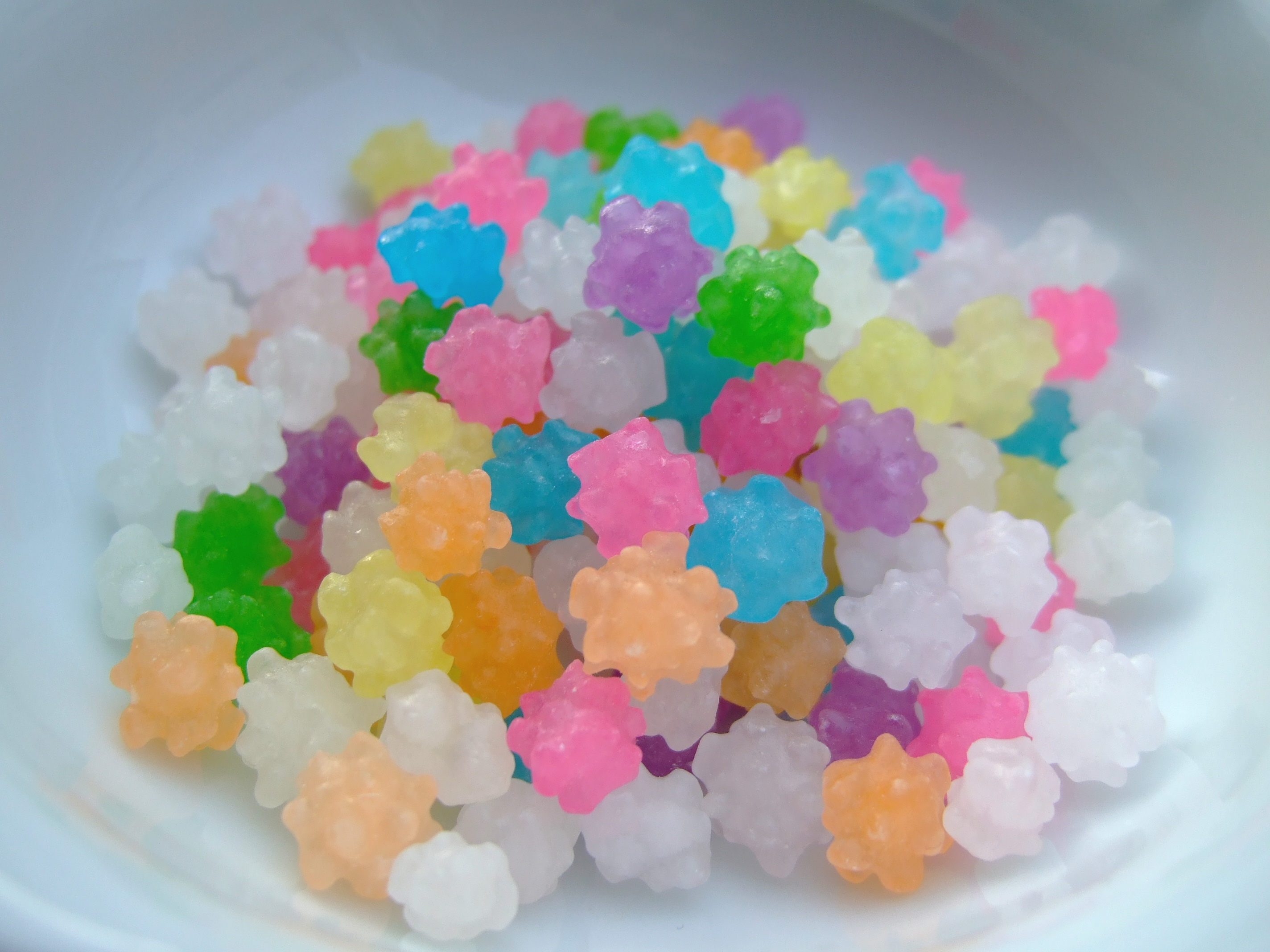
Konpeitō, a sugar candy introduced by Portuguese traders.

Portuguese Jesuits also played a role in writing several works about the Japanese language and society. Publications include the first Japanese-to-Portuguese dictionary and Japanese grammar, the latter by João Rodrigues, in the early 1600s, which took more than four years to compile and have become valuable resources for philological studies of Japanese and Portuguese today. Other important works include the books "The First European Description of Japan" and "Historia de Iapam" by Luís Fróis and "História da Igreja do Japão" (also by João Rodrigues) on the history of Japan.

In 1556 Jesuit Luís de Almeida, who disseminated surgical and other medical knowledge from Europe to Japan, founded the first European hospital of Western medicine in Japan, a leprosy ward and a kindergarten in Ōita. He built the hospital in Funai with the permission of the daimyō Ōtomo Sōrin. This hospital was able to accommodate about 100 patients. Initially, Almeida was in charge of the surgical department, and internal medicine was in the hands of converted Japanese doctors, who were so successful in applying Chinese-Japanese therapies that some of them were singled out by name.

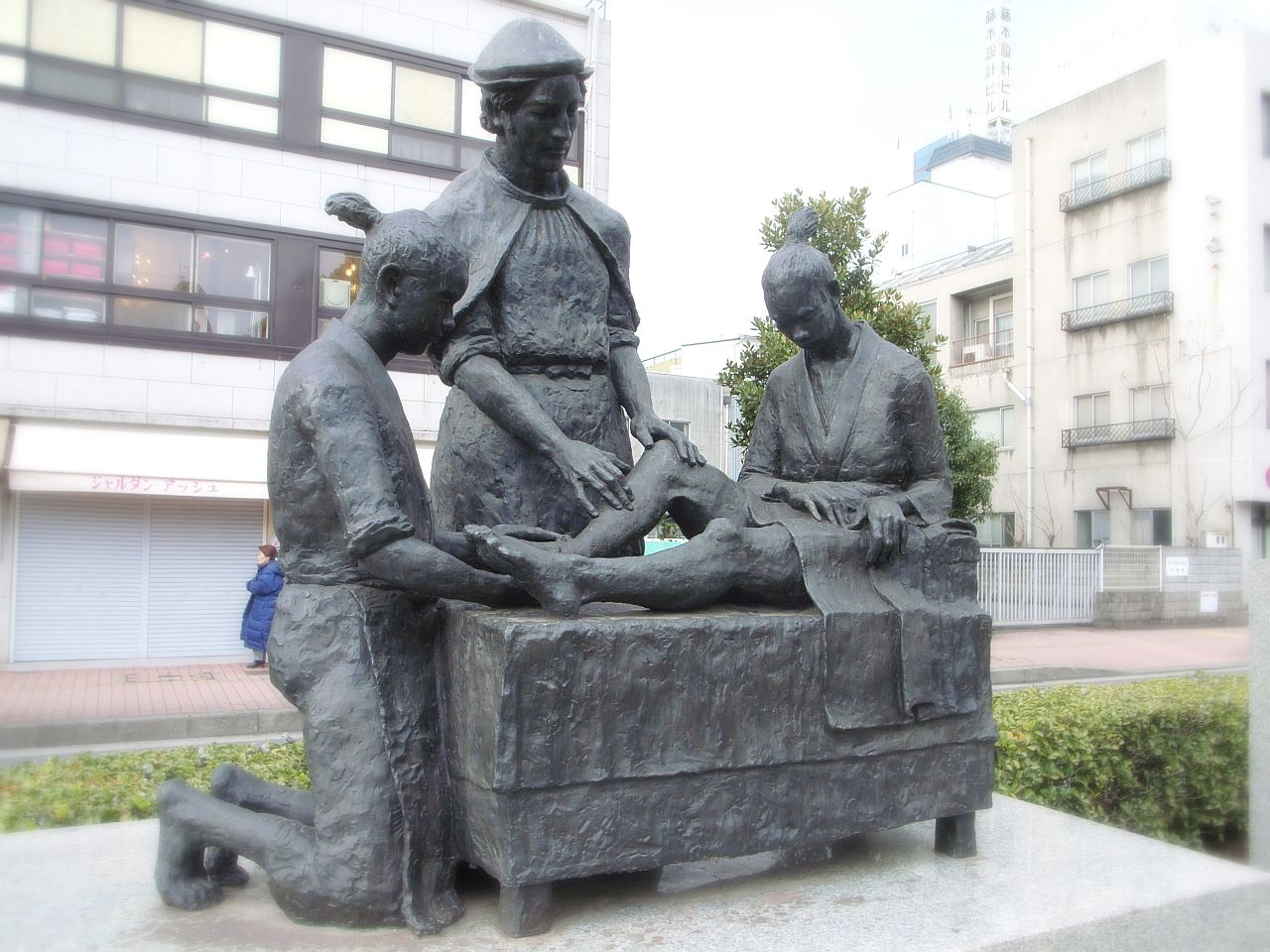
Luís de Almeida, founded the first Hospital of Western medicine in Japan.

The hospital had departments for surgery, internal medicine, and leprosy, and was the first hospital in Japan where Western medicine was introduced. He also began medical education in 1558, training doctors.

With the decree against Christianity in Japan in 1587 and the expulsion of missionaries from 1614 onwards, the persecution of Christians in Japan began, which ended in 1639 with the expulsion of the Jesuits and the Portuguese from Japan. As early as 1625, Francisco Pacheco, head of the Jesuit mission in Japan, was executed at the gates of Nagasaki. The Portuguese missionary Cristóvão Ferreira, who arrived in Japan in 1610, contributed to the tense situation on the issue with his varied role until he was executed there around 1650. The Buddhist monks in Japan, who feared for their power, also pushed for the expulsion.

=== 20th century ===
In World War I, Portugal and Japan participated together in the war on the Allied side. After the war, nine countries, including Japan and Portugal, attended the Washington Naval Conference of 1922, where they both ratified the Nine-Power Treaty.

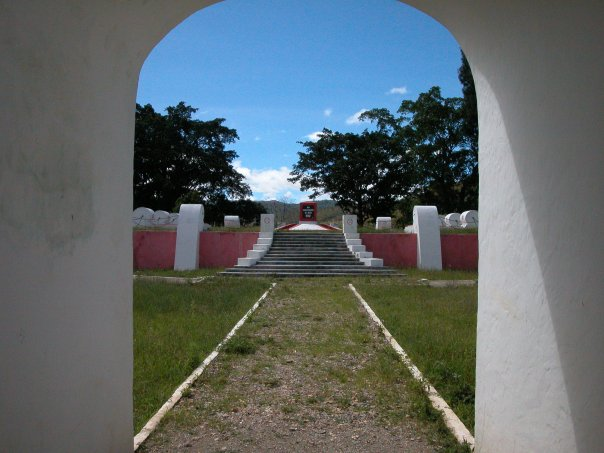
A memorial for the Timorese and Portuguese who died as a result of the Second World War, in Aileu, East Timor.

During the Second World War, both countries had a complicated relationship. Portugal was officially neutral; while it was aligned more closely with the Allies, it adhered to strict neutrality in East Asia, to protect its territories of Macau and East Timor. Initially, Japan respected the neutrality of both territories. Macau, in particular, become a haven for Allied civilian refugees. To varying degrees, however, both Macau and East Timor later came under de facto control of Japan, until the end of the war. During this time, diplomatic relations were temporarily disrupted.

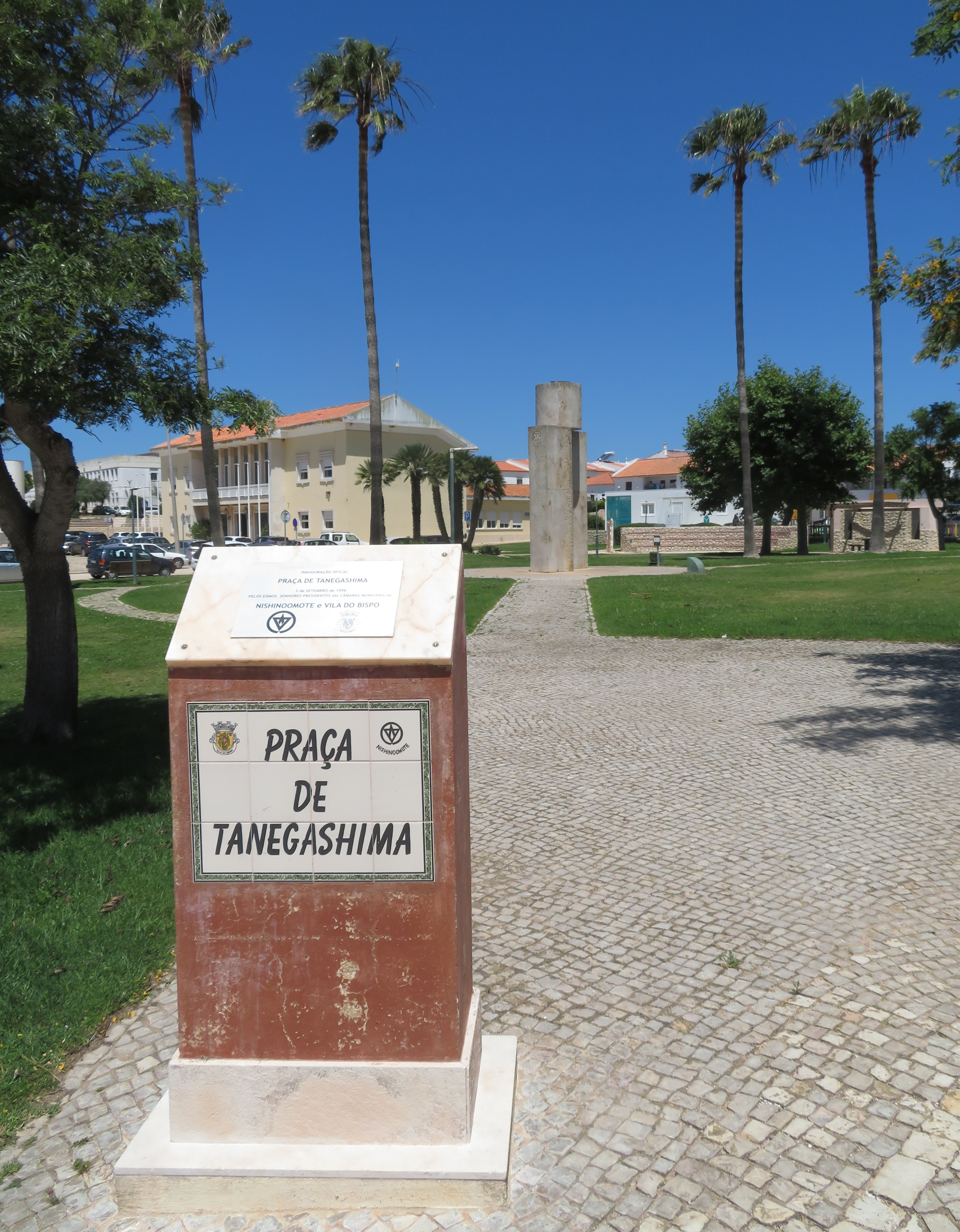
Central square Praça de Tanegashima in Vila do Bispo, Portugal.

In early 1942, as Japanese forces advanced rapidly through the Dutch East Indies, Portugal declined all requests for cooperation from the Allies, who believed that East Timor would become the site of major Japanese bases. Nevertheless, Portugal did not object, when Australian and Dutch forces landed unilaterally in East Timor, to set up defensive positions. In the subsequent Timor campaign, the indigenous Timorese and other Portuguese subjects assisted the Allies and suffered reprisals from Japanese forces. The Allies withdrew in 1943 and East Timor remained under de facto Japanese occupation until late 1945, when Japanese troops in East Timor surrendered to the Portuguese governor.

Meanwhile, the Portuguese authorities in Macau were coming under increasing pressure to cooperate with the Japanese military. In August 1943, Japanese troops seized a British-registered steamer in the harbor of Macau. Soon afterwards, Japan issued an ultimatum to Portugal, demanding that the territorial government accept the installation of Japanese advisors, and threatening direct occupation. Portugal acceded to Japanese demands and Macau effectively became a Japanese protectorate. Believing that Japan had or would get access to stores of aviation fuel in Macau, US forces launched several air raids on the territory. In 1950, the US government compensated the Portuguese government with US$20M, for the damage caused in Macau by US air raids. In 1945 the Japanese finally withdrew and gave East Timor back to Portugal.

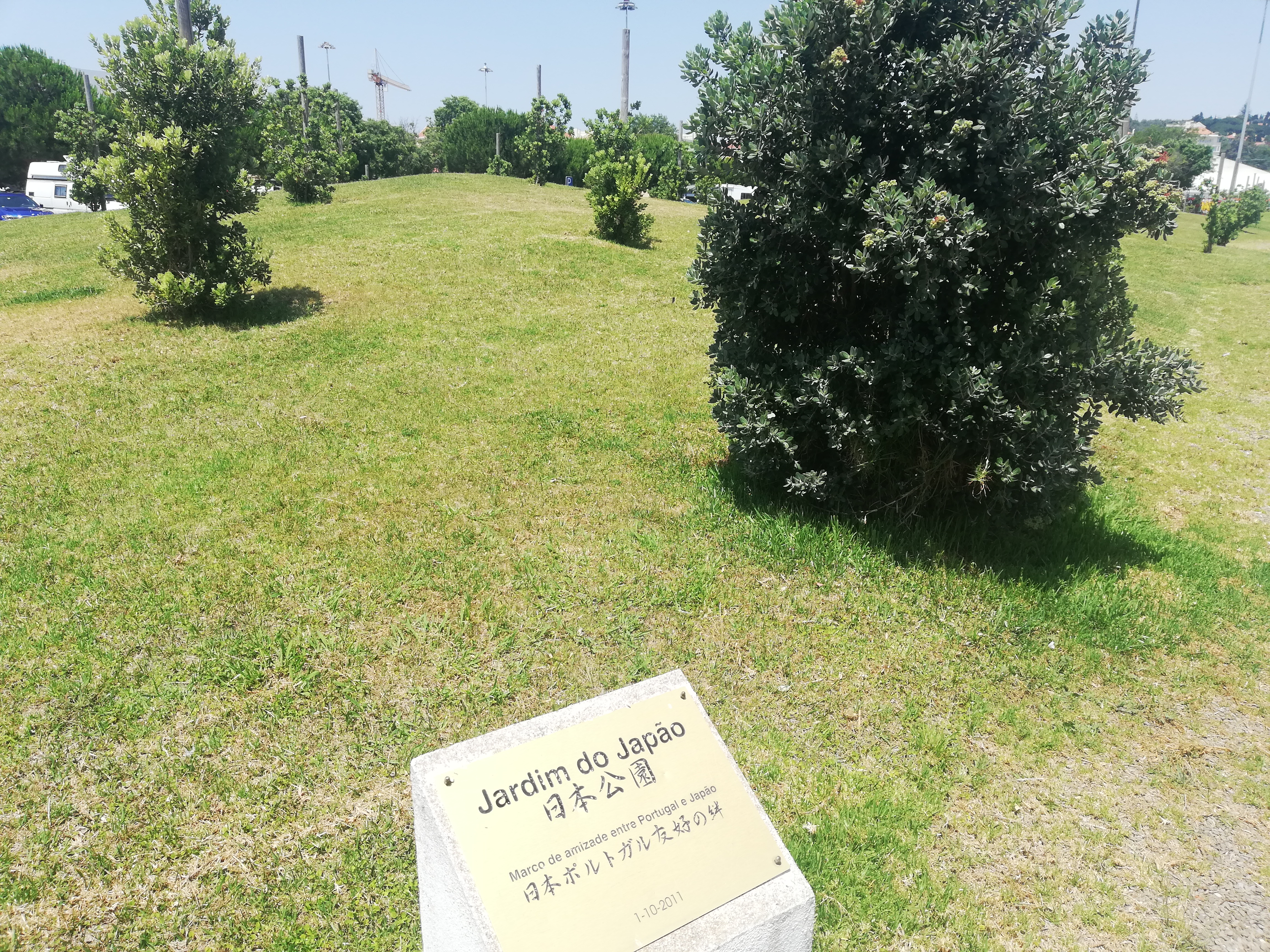
Japanese garden in Lisbon, marking the friendship between the nations (created in 2011).

In 1952, Japan regained its sovereignty by issuing the Treaty of San Francisco, and diplomatic relations between Portugal and Japan were restored the following year in 1953. In the same year, Portugal established an embassy in Japan (Tokyo) and Japan in Portugal (Lisbon) in 1954. Since then, Portugal has undergone major changes from the dictatorship of António Salazar to democratization through the Carnation Revolution and membership in the European Economic Community and the European Union, and has lost its remaining territory in Asia with the independence of East Timor and handover of Macau.

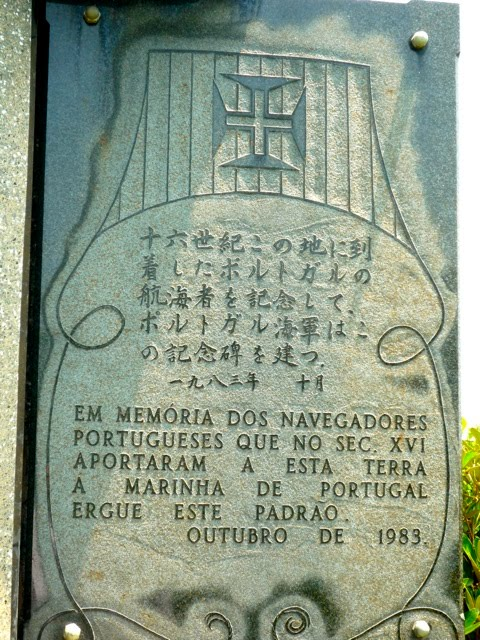
Memorial to the Portuguese landing in Cape Kadokura, Kagoshima

Relations between Portugal and Japan have since remained good and friendly. In 1993, events commemorating the 450th anniversary of the arrival of the Portuguese to Tanegashima were held. In the same year, President Mário Soares visited Japan and Princess Hisako Takamado visited Portugal.

In 1998, the Lisbon World Exposition was held under the theme "The Oceans: a Heritage for the Future", with Emperor Akihito and Empress Michiko making their first visit to Portugal.

=== 21st century ===
In 2004, the then prince and current emperor Naruhito travelled to Portugal.

In 2010 and 2020, a number of cultural and sporting events (such as Japanese film, anime shows, judo events and calligraphy exhibitions and workshops) were held in Portugal to commemorate the 150th and 160th anniversaries of diplomatic relations and friendship between the two countries since the 19th century.

In Nagasaki, the Kunchi festival is celebrated annually and features the arrival and presence of the Portuguese in the city, in the 16th century. One of the main attractions of the Kunchi Festival, celebrated every autumn, is the denunciation of the hidden Christians and the “Nau Portuguesa”, which constitutes an historical evocation of the Portuguese expansion to Japan, highlighting the importance of Portuguese universal history and culture.

In Minamishimabara region near Nagasaki, the 'Festivitas Natalis' festival is held to recreate what Christmas was like in 16th-century Japan. The celebration features a historical parade with costumes from the Nanban era—the period when Europeans, particularly the Portuguese, first arrived in Japan. The festival honors Nanban culture and its early European influence through music, food, and traditions from that time, while also commemorating the arrival of Christian missionaries who introduced Christianity to the region.

== High-level Visits ==
=== Japan to Portugal ===
Year	Name
2001	President of the House of Councillors Inoue Yutaka
2002	Minister for Foreign Affairs Tanaka Makiko
2003	Speaker of the House of Representatives Tamisuke Watanuki
2004	His Imperial Highness the Crown Prince Naruhito
2006	Minister of State Kōki Chūma Special Envoy Taimei Yamaguchi
2007	Parliamentary Vice-Minister of Defense Issei Kitagawa Parliamentary Vice-Minister of Economy, Trade and Industry Masaji Matsuyama
2009	Former Prime Minister Junichiro Koizumi
2010	Senior Vice Minister for Foreign Affairs Yutaka Banno
2014	Prime Minister Shinzo Abe Minister of State Tomomi Inada
2015	Parliamentary Vice-Minister of Cabinet Office Yohei Matsumoto
2017	Parliamentary Vice-Minister for Foreign Affairs Motome Takisawa
2019	Minister of State Takuya Hirai
2020	Minister for Foreign Affairs Toshimitsu Motegi
2021	Minister for the World Expo 2025 and Minister for Special Missions Shinji Inoue

=== Portugal to Japan ===
Year	Name
2000	Minister of Labour and Solidarity Eduardo Luiz Barreto Ferro Rodrigues
2002	Vice-Minister of Foreign Affairs Luís Filipe Marques Amado
2003	Vice-Minister of Foreign Affairs Lourenço dos Santos
2004	Minister of Foreign Affairs Teresa Patrício de Gouveia
2005	President Jorge Fernando Branco de Sampaio
2006	Minister of Economy and Innovation Manuel António Gomes de Almeida de Pinho
2007	Minister of Foreign Affairs Luís Filipe Marques Amado
2008	President of the Assembly of the Republic Jaime José Matos da Gama
2011	Minister of Finance Fernando Teixeira dos Santos
2012	Minister of Finance Vítor Louçã Rabaça Gaspar Governor at Banco de Portugal Carlos da Silva Costa
2013	Minister of Foreign Affairs Paulo Sacadura Cabral Portas
2014	Minister of Agriculture, Sea, Environment and Spatial Planning Maria de Assunção Oliveira Cristas Machado da Graça
2015	Secretary of State of Food and Agri-food Research Alexandre Nuno Vaz Baptista de Vieira e Brito Minister of Internal Administration Anabela Miranda Rodrigues Prime Minister Pedro Manuel Mamede Passos Coelho Minister of Foreign Affairs Rui Manuel Parente Chancerelle de Machete Minister of Economy António Pires de Lima Minister of Environment, Spatial Planning and Energy Jorge Manuel Lopes Moreira da Silva
2016	Minister of Planning and Infrastructure Pedro Manuel Dias de Jesus Marques Secretary of State of Internationalization Jorge Costa Oliveira
2017	Secretary of State of Internationalization Jorge Costa Oliveira (50th ADB Annual Meeting)
2018	Minister of Planning and Infrastructure Pedro Manuel Dias de Jesus Marques Secretary of State of Internationalization Eurico Jorge Nogueira Leite Brilhante Dias
2019	Secretary of State of Foreign Affairs and Cooperation Teresa Ribeiro Ex-Presidente Aníbal Cavaco Silva (Ceremony of Enthronement)
2020	Secretary of State for Internationalization Eurico Brilhante Dias Secretary of State for Energy João Galamba

== Economic relations ==
Unlike in the 16th and 17th centuries, the current relationship between the two countries has little influence on each other's political and economic situation. In 2010, exports from Japan amounted to $479,858,000 and exports from Portugal amounted to $270,635,000, representing a significant export surplus on the Japanese side. The proportion of total exports is only 0.06%, and the proportion of exports from Portugal in Japan's imports is 0.04%. Even among the 27 EU member countries, Portugal remains Japan's 18th largest partner country in terms of export value and 19th largest in terms of import value. The share of Portugal's trade with Japan in its total exports and imports was approximately 0.5–0.6% in 2009, and while intra-EU trade accounts for approximately 74% of total exports and imports, the contribution of trade with Japan is small. Japan's exports have a high share of passenger and freight vehicles, auto parts, and electrical equipment, while Portugal's main exports include clothing and accessories, vegetables, fish, wine, and cork. Natural cork in particular has a high market share in Japan.

In February 2011, Nissan started construction of a plant to produce lithium-ion batteries for electric vehicles in Aveiro, Portugal. This would be located on the site of Renault's transmission assembly plant, and production was scheduled to begin in December 2012. This was a large-scale business deal in which Nissan Europe would invest approximately 17.5 billion yen.

In 2016, with an overnight spending of 29.7 million euros, Japanese tourists accounted for a share of 0.23% of foreign tourists in Portugal.

== Cultural relations ==
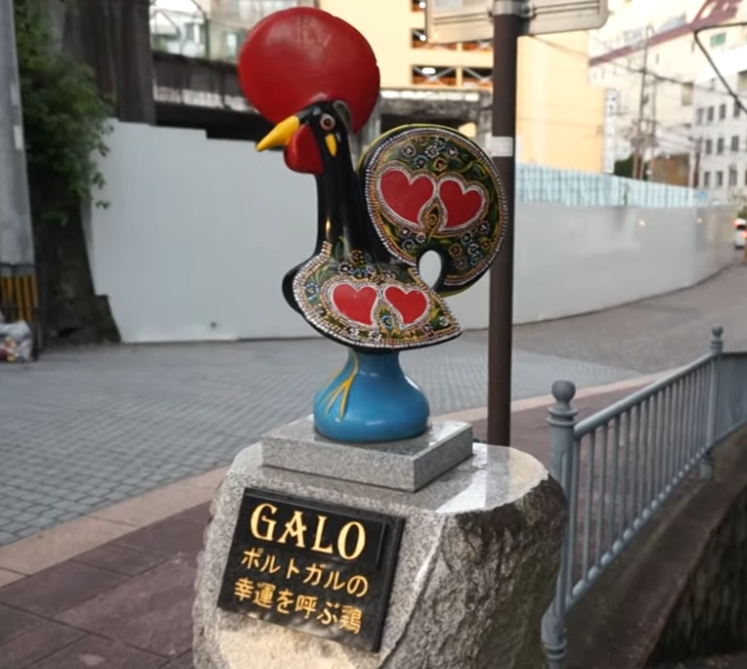
Rooster of Barcelos in Nagasaki

Although the economic relationship between the two countries has diminished since Japan's isolation, there are still relatively deep ties in terms of culture and academics, especially within Japan. Portugal was the first European nation to have direct negotiations with Japan, and the cultural artifacts imported at that time, such as buttons, playing cards, wine and several Japanese sweets and foods (such as tempura, konpeito, and castella), are still called by names of Portuguese origin and have left a legacy that has become entrenched in Japanese society. Likewise, some words of Japanese origin have also made their way into Portuguese vocabulary, and several pieces of Japanese culture like food, anime and manga, video games, music (J-pop), as well as Japanese technology have found significant popularity in Portugal.

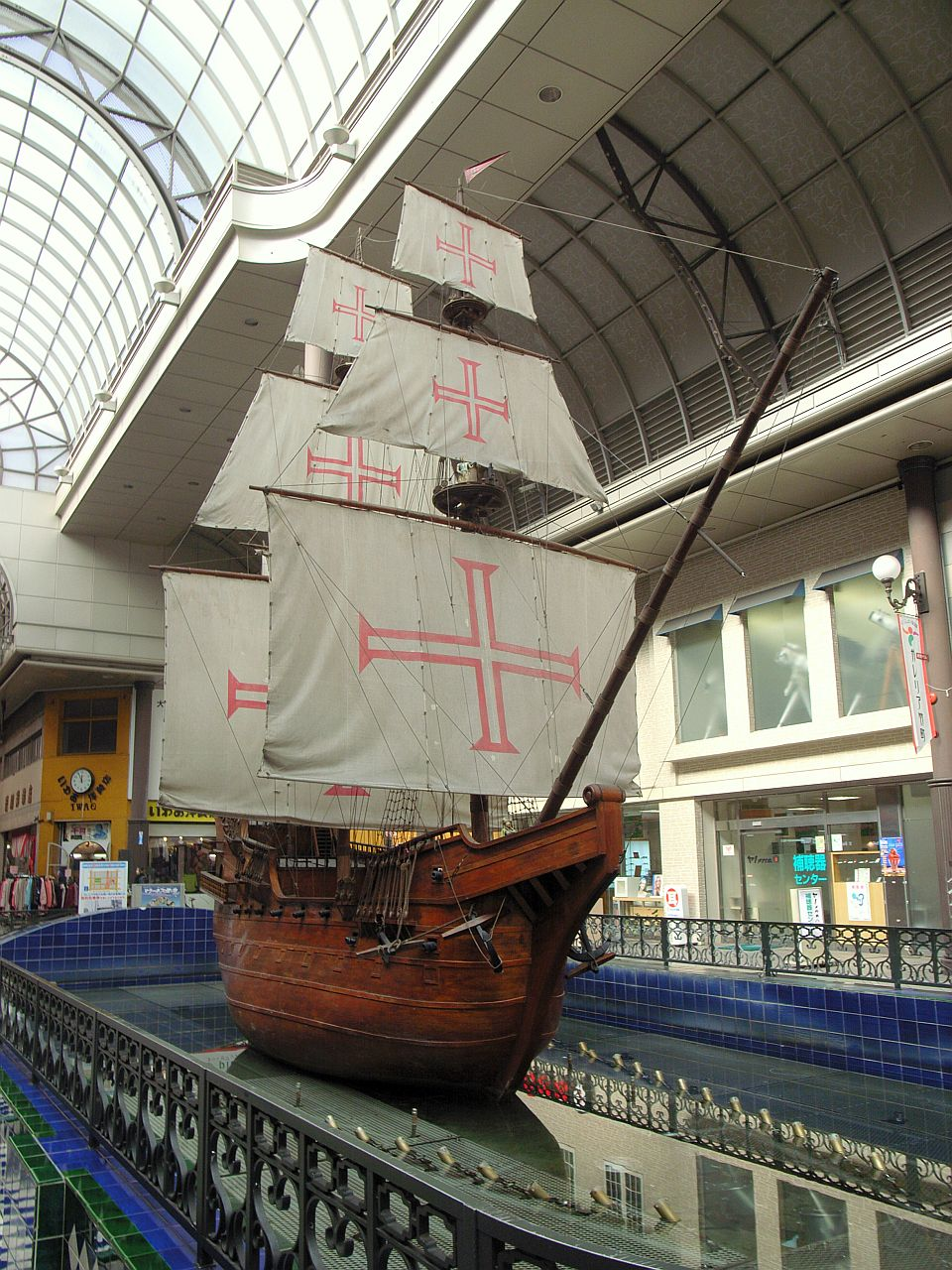
Portuguese galleon in Galleria Takemachi, Oita

In terms of academics, Jesuit missionary Luís Fróis has left behind valuable records that provide a glimpse into feudal Japan, such as The First European Description of Japan, published in 1585, and Historia de Iapam ("History of Japan" in old-fashioned Portuguese). Another person worth mentioning is Wenceslau de Moraes, a diplomat who lived in Japan from 1899 to 1929 and died in Tokushima after Japan opened up in the 19th century after isolation during the Edo period. He left behind essays about Japan and the Japanese people. In some parts of Yamaguchi Prefecture (such as Shunan City), there is a surname of Portuguese origin called Tobacco Dani.

The Portuguese cultural institute Instituto Camões is active in Japan, represented with a cultural center in Tokyo and a large number of lectureships at various Japanese universities. There are also a number of Portuguese-Japanese friendship societies, such as the Sociedade Luso-Nipónica.

As a result of many Japanese immigrating to Brazil at the end of the 19th century, and from the 1980s their descendants beginning working in Japanese manufacturing factories, opportunities for Japanese people to come into contact with Portuguese increased. Many Portuguese-speaking players participated in the Japan Professional Football League, which was launched in 1993. Football terms such as "volante" became established in Japan.

=== Language ===
As a result of the Portuguese arrival to Japan and a continuous influx of trade between the countries, Japanese vocabulary absorbed words of Portuguese origin as well as Portuguese of Japanese. Many of these words mainly refer to products and customs that arrived through Portuguese traders.

Portuguese was the first Western language to have a Japanese dictionary, the Nippo Jisho (日葡辞書, Nippojisho) dictionary or "Vocabulario da Lingoa de Iapam" ("Vocabulary of the Language of Japan" in old-fashioned Portuguese orthography), as well as the oldest extant complete Japanese grammar, the Arte da Lingoa de Iapam ("Art of the Japanese Language"), compiled by Jesuits such as João Rodrigues, published in Nagasaki between 1603 and 1608.

=== Film and music ===
The Portuguese director Paulo Rocha lived in Japan from 1975 to 1983, and he featured Japan several times in his films. Particularly worth mentioning is "Koi no ukishima - A Ilha dos Amores" in 1982 and "Portugaru San – O Sr. Portugal em Tokushima" shot in 1993, a film about the Portuguese diplomat and author Wenceslau de Moraes. In 1996, João Mário Grilo made "Os Olhos da Ásia", a film about the history of the Portuguese Jesuits in Japan. 20 years later, Martin Scorsese revisited the story in Silence (2016), but limited himself to the original novel by Endō Shūsaku. In 2016, the Portuguese director Cláudia Varejão portrayed the everyday life of three women who have been diving together in a small fishing village on the Shima Peninsula for 30 years with her documentary Ama-San. The film screened at a number of film festivals, where it also won several awards, including the Lisbon Doclisboa, the Czech Karlovy Vary International Film Festival, the Russian St. Petersburg Message to Man Film Festival and the Kosovo Dokufest. In 2017 João Botelho directed Peregrinação, an adaptation of the book of the same name, by Fernão Mendes Pinto. In 2024, the TV series Shōgun aired, based on the original novel by James Clavell.

The award-winning short film Tóquio Porto 9 horas by the Portuguese director João Nuno Brochado uses black and white split-screen technology to compare everyday life in the two cities of Tokyo and Porto, which are separated by a time difference of nine hours. Japanese director Hiroatsu Suzuki and Portuguese director Rosanna Torres worked together in 2012 to make O Sabor do Leite Creme, a documentary about an old couple in a Portuguese mountain village. The Japanese cameraman Takashi Sugimoto has worked several times for Portuguese productions. The Portuguese film institute Cinemateca Portuguesa showed film cycles on Japanese film several times, around 2012. Japanese directors are more frequent guests at Portuguese film festivals. Occasionally they also receive awards there, such as Atsushi Wada, who won the award for best animation at the most important Portuguese short film festival Curtas Vila do Conde in 2011 for "Wakaranai Buta". In 2014, Hiroyuki Tanaka won "Miss Zombie" at the Fantasporto film festival in Porto.

Portuguese and culture has also been introduced to Japan through music, with Fado having some fans in Japan and Portuguese musicians and singers such as Amália Rodrigues, Maria João Pires, Dulce Pontes and Carlos do Carmo having become known among music lovers in Japan, both through performances and publications. The Japanese conductor Takuo Yuasa worked several times in Portugal. Most recently, he led the Orquestra Sinfónica do Porto Casa da Música, the 96-piece symphony orchestra of the Casa da Música in Porto, in the two sold-out New Year's concerts there on 3 and 4 January 2020.

=== Sports ===
In football, professional Portuguese footballer Cristiano Ronaldo is also renown among Japanese football fans. Japanese football players also play more frequently in Portugal, including international players such as Takahito Sōma or Daizen Maeda (both Marítimo Funchal), Nozomi Hiroyama at Sporting Braga or Junya Tanaka at Sporting Lisbon. The Portimonense SC club particularly frequently signs players from Japan, including Mū Kanazaki, Shoya Nakajima, Takuma Nishimura, Shiryū Fujiwara, Kōki Anzai and most recently Kodai Nagashima and Hiroki Sugajima. Kazuya Onohara has been playing for UD Oliveirense since 2020, and Kaito Anzai has been playing for Sporting Braga since 2019. The Japan women's national football team participated in the 2011 Algarve Cup and finished in 3rd place.

In basketball, Isabel Lemos was the first Portuguese coach ever working in a profissional league in Rizing Zephyr Fukuoka senior male team of the B.League, as well as the first woman ever working as coach in professional basketball man league in Japan.

In martial arts, judo has been practiced in Portugal since a demonstration by two officers of the Imperial Japanese Navy while anchored in Lisbon in the early 20th century. Since its founding in 1959, the Portuguese umbrella organization Federação Portuguesa de Judo has been organizing Japanese martial arts in Portugal. The country hosted the 2008 European Judo Championships and finished eighth with one gold and three bronze medals. At the 1995 World Judo Championships in Japan, Portugal won a bronze medal, as well as in 2003, while in 2010 it brought home a silver medal from Japan. Judo is one of the sports of the Jogos da Lusofonia, the games of the Portuguese-speaking world. Other Japanese martial arts are also practiced in an organized manner in Portugal, particularly jujutsu, karate and aikidō.

== Twin towns ==
Multiple cities in both countries are in partnership or are striving to do so. The first Japanese-Portuguese town twinning was established in 1969 between Tokushima and Leiria.

- (Japan) Atami – (Portugal) Cascais
- (Japan) Hitoyoshi – (Portugal) Abrantes
- (Japan) Nagasaki – (Portugal) Porto
- (Japan) Nishinoomote – (Portugal) Vila do Bispo
- (Japan) Ōita – (Portugal) Aveiro
- (Japan) Ōmura – (Portugal) Sintra
- (Japan) Tokushima – (Portugal) Leiria

== Timeline ==
- 1543 – A Portuguese ship washes ashore on Tanegashima. Guns were introduced to Japan.
- 1549 – Francis Xavier arrives in Kagoshima and introduces Christianity.
- 1553 – Bernardo the Japanese is the first Japanese to visit Europe.
- 1556 – Diplomatic relations are established between Portugal and the Otomo clan. Luís de Almeida builds the first hospital, with Western medicine, in Ōita.
- 1557 – Portugal obtains permanent residency in Macau from the Ming dynasty.
- 1560 – Yoshiteru Ashikaga's sanction for Gaspar Vilela to preach Christianity in Kyoto.
- 1563 – Luís Fróis arrives in Japan.
- 1565 – Battle of Fukuda Bay, the first recorded naval clash between Europeans and the Japanese.
- 1571 – Daimyō Ōmura Sumitada assists the Portuguese in establishing the port of Nagasaki. King Sebastião I of Portugal issues a decree prohibiting the holding of Japanese in slavery without justifiable reason.
- 1576 – Japan's first cannon is presented to Ōtomo Sōrin by Portugal.
- 1577 – João Rodrigues arrives in Japan.
- 1580 – Ōmura Sumitada cedes Nagasaki "in perpetuity" to the Jesuits. Portugal enters in a dynastic union with Spain.
- 1582 – Tenshō embassy to Europe departs from Nagasaki.
- 1584 – Mancio Itō arrives in Lisbon with three other Japanese, accompanied by a Jesuit father. He was the first Japanese envoy to Europe.
- 1587 – Toyotomi Hideyoshi issues a document declaring the expulsion of Portuguese missionaries and freedom of trade.
- 1603 – Nippo Jisho Japanese to Portuguese dictionary is published by Jesuits in Nagasaki, containing entries for 32,293 Japanese words in Portuguese.
- 1610 – Destruction of the Nossa Senhora da Graça near Nagasaki, leading to a 2-year hiatus in Portuguese trade.
- 1613 – The Edo Shogunate (Tokugawa Ieyasu) issues a ban on Christianity throughout Japan.
- 1620 – Pingshan Changchen Incident.
- 1636 – Shogun Tokugawa Iemitsu's fourth national isolation order restricts Portuguese trade in Japan to Dejima.
- 1637 – Shimabara Rebellion by Christian peasants.
- 1639 – The fifth national isolation order completely prohibits trade with Portugal and Portuguese ships from entering the port and Japan.
- 1640 – 1640 Macau embassy to Nagasaki
- 1647 – King João IV of Portugal sends an envoy to Japan to resume trade.
- 1649 – Portuguese envoys arrive in Nagasaki, but the shogunate refuses trade.
- 1685 – A Portuguese ship returns Japanese castaways to Nagasaki, but trade is refused to resume.
- 1860 – On 3 August, the Edo Shogunate and the Kingdom of Portugal sign the Treaty of Peace, Amity and Commerce. Formal diplomatic relations are established.
- 1862 – First Japanese Embassy to Europe stops at Lisbon.
- 1866 – The Portuguese embassy in Japan is established.
- 1868 – Meiji Restoration. The new Meiji government inherits diplomatic relations with foreign countries including Portugal.
- 1910 – 5 October 1910 revolution in Portugal. Abolition of the monarchy and establishment of the First Portuguese Republic.
- 1914 – World War I (−1918). Japan (Empire of Japan) enters the war on the Allied side.
- 1916 – Portugal enters the war on the Allied side. The Department of Portuguese is established at Tokyo School of Foreign Studies (currently Tokyo University of Foreign Studies, Department of Portuguese).
- 1922 – The Nine-Power Treaty is concluded at the Washington Naval Conference.
- 1924 – Supreme Council of the Allied Reparations Commission.
- 1932 – Portugal supports the League of Nations' Lytton Commission Report. Japan opposes the move and withdraws from the League of Nations.
- 1933 – The dictatorship of António Salazar begins in Portugal (Estado Novo).
- 1937 – Brussels International Conference.
- 1939 – The outbreak of World War II. Both countries declare neutrality, but Japan takes policies closer to Nazi Germany and Portugal takes policies closer to Britain.
- 1941 – Portugal imposes economic sanctions against Japan, including asset freezes. At the outbreak of the Pacific War, Japan enters the war on the side of the Axis powers. East Timor, a Portuguese colony, is occupied by the Dutch army (Dutch East Indies Army) and the Australian army.
- 1942 – Japan defeats the Dutch and Australian armies and occupies the entire island of Timor. Portugal remains neutral while tacitly accepting the Japanese occupation.
- 1943 – Japan makes Macau a protectorate.
- 1945 – Japan surrenders, ending World War II. The Japanese army that occupied Timor is disarmed, and Portuguese colonial rule was restored in Macau and East Timor.
- 1953 – Japan and Portugal restore diplomatic relations.
- 1959 – The Japanese Embassy in Portugal is established.
- 1968 – The Japan Portugal Association is established in Japan.
- 1970 – Writer Kazuo Dan stays in Santa Cruz north of Lisbon (−1972).
- 1974 – Carnation Revolution in Portugal. The new government decides to withdraw from all overseas colonies, but continues to rule Macau.
- 1975 – East Timor declares independence from Portugal. Immediately afterward, the Indonesian military invades and occupies the country (East Timor conflict). Portugal condemns the occupation, but Japan virtually acquiesces.
- 1981 – The Portugal-Japan Friendship Association is established in Portugal.
- 1986 – Portugal joins the European Economic Community (EEC). Rosa Mota wins the Tokyo International Women's Marathon.
- 1989 – Mário Soares becomes the first Portuguese president to visit Japan for the Great Funeral Ceremony for Emperor Showa.
- 1993 – Portugal participates in the establishment of the European Union (EU). 450th anniversary of Japan–Portugal relations. President Soares visits Japan and Princess Takamado visits Portugal.
- 1996 – Published "Modern Portuguese Dictionary" (Mutsuo Ikegami, Norio Kinana, etc.). Carlos Queiroz becomes manager of the Nagoya Grampus Eight of the Japan Professional Football League (J League) ( -1997).
- 1998 – Emperor Akihito and Empress Michiko visit Portugal for the Lisbon Expo '98 (the first visit by an Emperor and Empress to Portugal). Former Portugal representative Paulo Futre joins Yokohama Flugels of the J League (left the same year).
- 1999 – Portugal returns Macau to the People's Republic of China. Portuguese territory in Asia virtually disappears. Portugal introduces the euro.
- 2002 – 2002 FIFA World Cup. The Portuguese national team plays all three matches in this tournament in South Korea and did not visit Japan. After the tournament, Nozomi Hiroyama joined SC Braga as the first Japanese player in the Primeira Liga (−2003).
- 2004 – The then prince Naruhito travels to Portugal.
- 2005 – Portugal participates in Expo 2005 and President Jorge Sampaio visits Japan.
- 2010 – Portuguese film festival commemorates the 150th anniversary of diplomatic relations and friendship between Portugal and Japan since the 19th century.
- 2011 – Japan women's national football team participates in the 2011 Algarve Cup for the first time (3rd place).
- 2020 – Portuguese festival commemorates the 160th anniversary of diplomatic relations and friendship between Portugal and Japan since the 19th century.

== Resident diplomatic missions ==
- Japan has an embassy in Lisbon, in addition to an honorary consulate in Porto.
- Portugal has an embassy in Tokyo, in addition to honorary consulates in Kōbe, Kyoto, Nagasaki, Nagoya, Osaka and Tokushima.
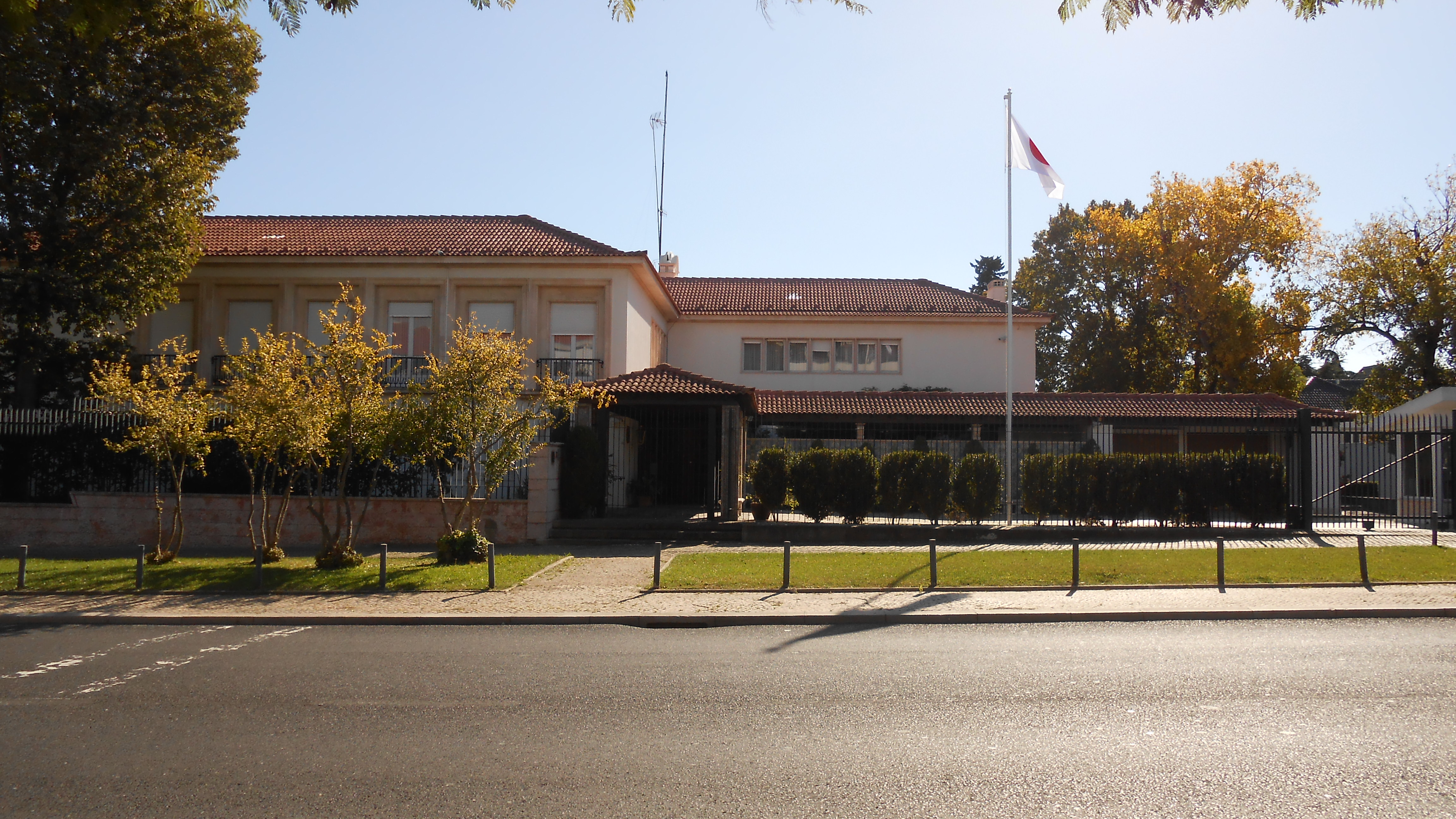
Residence of the embassy of Japan in Lisbon

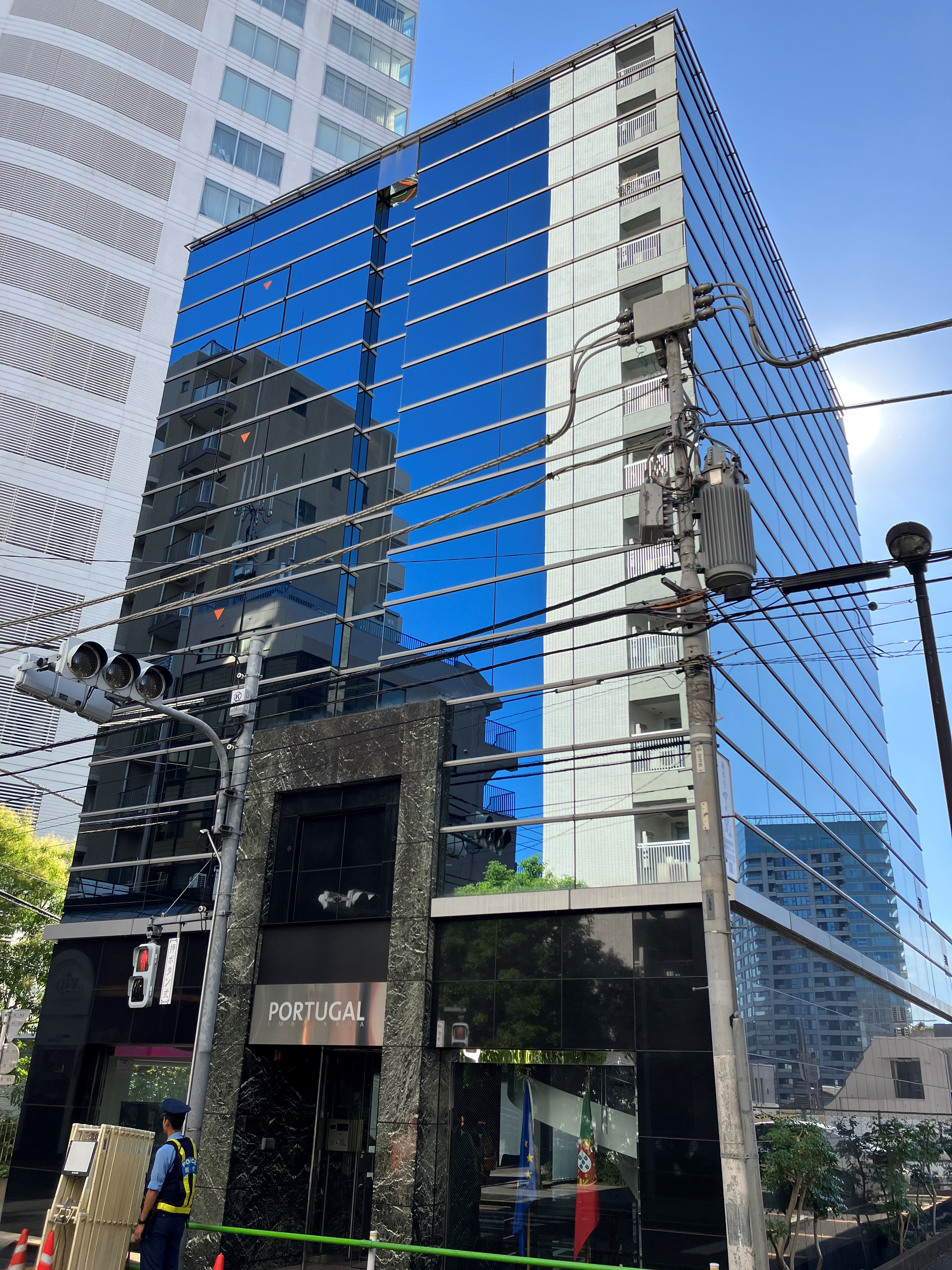
Embassy of Portugal in Tokyo

== See also ==
- Japan–Spain relations
- A Ilha dos Amores
- Arte da Lingoa de Iapam
- Christianity in Japan
- Hidden Christians of Japan
- History of Roman Catholicism in Japan
- Kirishtan
- List of Japanese words of Portuguese origin
- Medical School of Japan
- Nanban trade
- Nippo Jisho
- Tanegashima (Japanese matchlock)
