= Jean-Baptiste-Louis Gros =

French nobleman, diplomat, senator, photographer, painter (1793–1870)

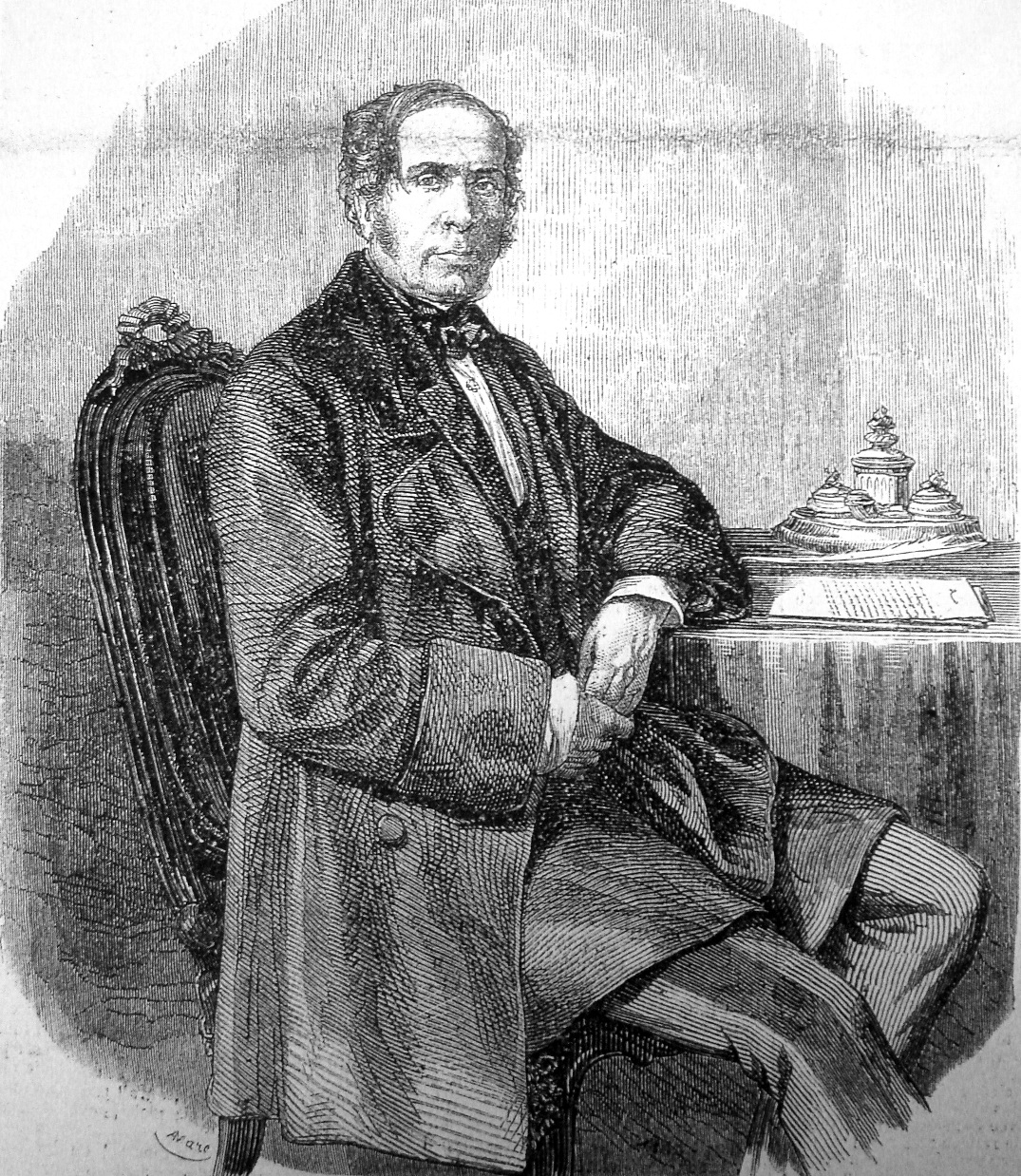
- Baron Gros in 1858

French senator

Baron Gros
- In office September 1858 – 17 August 1870

Personal details
- Born: 8 February 1793 Ivry-sur-Seine, French First Republic
- Died: 17 August 1870 (aged 77) Paris, Second French Empire
- Awards: Knight Order of Santiago (1839); Grand-croix, Legion of Honour (1861)

Military service
- Battles/wars: Second Opium War

Jean-Baptiste-Louis Gros (8 February 1793 – 17 August 1870), also known as Baron Gros, was a French diplomat, politician, and photographer.

== Biography ==
Gros was born on 8 February 1793, in Ivry-sur-Seine. He entered the French diplomatic service in 1823 and was given the title of baron in 1829 during the Bourbon Restoration. He was dispatched to Bogotá (1838–1842) as chargé d'affaires during the Colombian Civil War, and later elsewhere in Latin America, before being recalled to Europe and then sent as Minister Plenipotentiary to Athens in 1850.

Gros served as Ambassador to London (1852–1863), traveling extensively, including to China and Japan in 1857 and 1858. He was an ambassador during the Anglo-French expedition to China (1856-1860). On 9 October 1858, the Treaty of Amity and Commerce between France and Japan was concluded at Edo, to which he was a signatory; this treaty established diplomatic relations between the two imperial nations.

Gros produced many famous photographs – chief among them those of the Acropolis in Greece. While he is best known for his daguerreotypes, he painted a few Latin American landscape paintings which are quite striking for their realism. Baron Gros, a member of The Photographic Society, also photographed The Great Exhibition of 1851 in London.

In September 1858, Gros was named to the French Senate, where he served until his death. He died on 17 August 1870, aged 77, in Paris.

== Honours ==
- Baron (1829)
- Knight, Order of Santiago (1839)
- Grand-croix, Légion d'honneur (1861)

== See also ==
- France-Japan relations (19th century)
- List of Ambassadors of France to the United Kingdom
