= Janus Henricus Donker Curtius =

Last Opperhoofd of the Dutch trading post in Japan

Jan Hendrik Donker Curtius
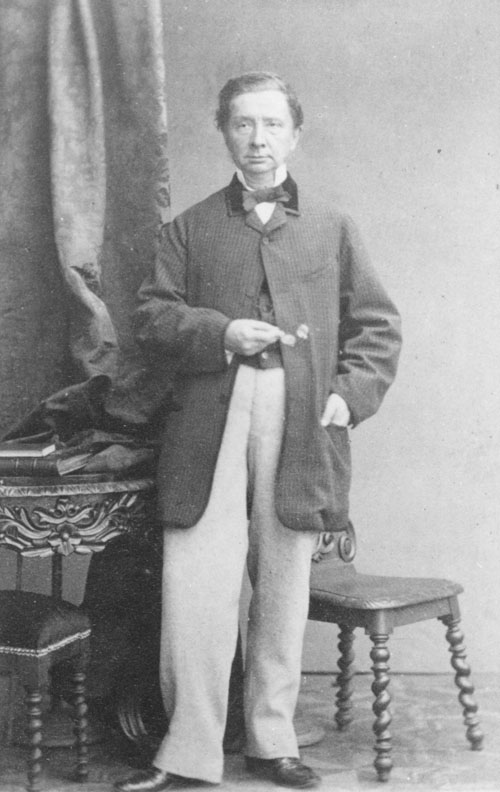
- Photograph of Donker Curtius 1862, The Hague
- Born: 21 April 1813; Arnhem, Netherlands
- Died: 27 November 1879 (aged 66); Arnhem, Netherlands
- Occupation: Diplomat

Jan Hendrik Donker Curtius (21 April 1813 – 27 November 1879) was the last Opperhoofd of the Dutch trading post in Japan (1852-1855), located at Dejima an artificial island in the harbor of Nagasaki. To negotiate with the Japanese government for a treaty, he received the title "Dutch Commissioner in Japan" in 1855.

== Biography ==
Donker Curtius was born in Arnhem in the Netherlands, as the son of Hendrik Herman Donker Curtius, a theologian. He grew up in Arnhem and studied law at Leiden University. To further his career prospects, he accepted a position as a judge at the High Court in Semarang in the Netherlands East Indies. He married a relative (Cornelia Hendrika Donker Curtius, died 8 November 1860) while on home leave in Amsterdam, and his first son, Boudewijn, was born at Semarang in 1845. His second son, Jan Hendrik, born at Batavia in 1849.

In July 1852, he was appointed to the post of Opperhoofd, the chief of the Dutch trade in Japan (the successor to the Dutch East India Company) trading post in Nagasaki, Japan. Since the beginning of the seventeenth century, the ruling Tokugawa shogunate of Japan pursued a policy of isolating the country from outside influences. Foreign trade was maintained only with the Dutch and the Chinese and was conducted exclusively at Nagasaki. By the early nineteenth century, this policy of isolation was increasingly under challenge. In 1844, King William II of the Netherlands sent a letter urging Japan to end the isolation policy on its own before change would be forced from the outside. The Dutch had also warned the Japanese of the Perry Expedition, and urged that Japan conclude a treaty of friendship and commerce with the Dutch government before a more onerous one was forced upon them by the Americans. In early August 1853, Russian vice admiral Yevfimy Putyatin arrived at Nagasaki with a fleet of four vessels, just one month after the visit to Perry to Uraga in an attempt to force the opening of Japan. At the time, Russia was at war with Great Britain (the Crimean War), and alarmed at the possibility that Russia would obtain the upper hand in Japan, Royal Navy vice admiral Sir James Stirling, commander of the East Indies and China Station led a fleet of British warships to Nagasaki on September 7, 1854. Stirling requested the assistance of Curtius to reaffirm Japan’s neutrality in the conflict, but through a series of miscommunications and misunderstandings, the negotiations ended with the signing of the Anglo-Japanese Friendship Treaty of 1854.

In 1855 Curtius organized the transfer of the HM Soembing from Royal Netherlands Navy to the Japanese government as a gift from Dutch King William III to Shogun Tokugawa Iesada. Renamed Kankō Maru, this was Japan’s first steam warship. Kankō Maru was assigned to be a training ship to the newly formed Nagasaki Naval Training Center with 22 Dutch sailors.

Curtius followed with the Dutch-Japanese Friendship Treaty of January 1856, which opened the city and port of Nagasaki to Dutch traders, who were no longer to be confined to their prison-like location in Dejima. However, the treaty was severely condemned in the Dutch Parliament and by the Minister of Colonies for its lack of a paragraph confirming trading rights. Curtius was forced to negotiate a follow-on agreement called the 'Additional Articles' in October 1857. Among the Japanese concessions to the Dutch in the "Additional Articles" was a pledge that the Dutch may practice Christianity in Japan; this constituted the first allowance of Christianity of any kind in Japan since the beginning of the Sakoku policy. In 1857 Curtius published a little book on Japanese grammar (Proeve eener Japansche spraakkunst) which was corrected and enlarged by J.J. Hoffman, Professor of Japanese and Chinese at Leiden University.

However, during this time Curtius was also plagued with administrative problems, and issues with his staff led him to dismiss most of his employees and order them back to Batavia. In 1858 Curtius made a ceremonial visit to Edo as representative of the King William III of the Netherlands to pay tribute to Shogun Tokugawa Iesada. He was accompanied by his secretary Dirk de Graeff van Polsbroek, who left a description of the voyage to Edo in his diary. In Edo, Curtius found that the American Consul Townsend Harris had concluded the Treaty of Amity and Commerce, which gave the Americans a far more advantageous position for trade than what had been enjoyed by the Dutch. He therefore concluded a new treaty between the Netherlands and Japan based on the American treaty, with the additional clause that the use of Fumi-e to check for illegal Kirishitan at the Nagasaki magistrate would be abolished.

During his stay in Japan Curtius acquired a collection of 111 books on Rangaku, which are today preserved at the Leiden University Library. Curtius left Japan in 1860 for Batavia. In 1861 he concluded a treaty between Siam and the Netherlands, after which he returned to Amsterdam. In 1864, he remarried to Geertruida Margaretha Constance Balck. He subsequently was employed by the Internationale Crediet Maatschappij at Rotterdam. Curtius died in his native Arnhem in 1879.

== Sources ==
Archive of the Ministry of the Colonies in the National Archive at The Hague, Dutch Factory in Japan.
