= 1640 Macau embassy to Nagasaki =

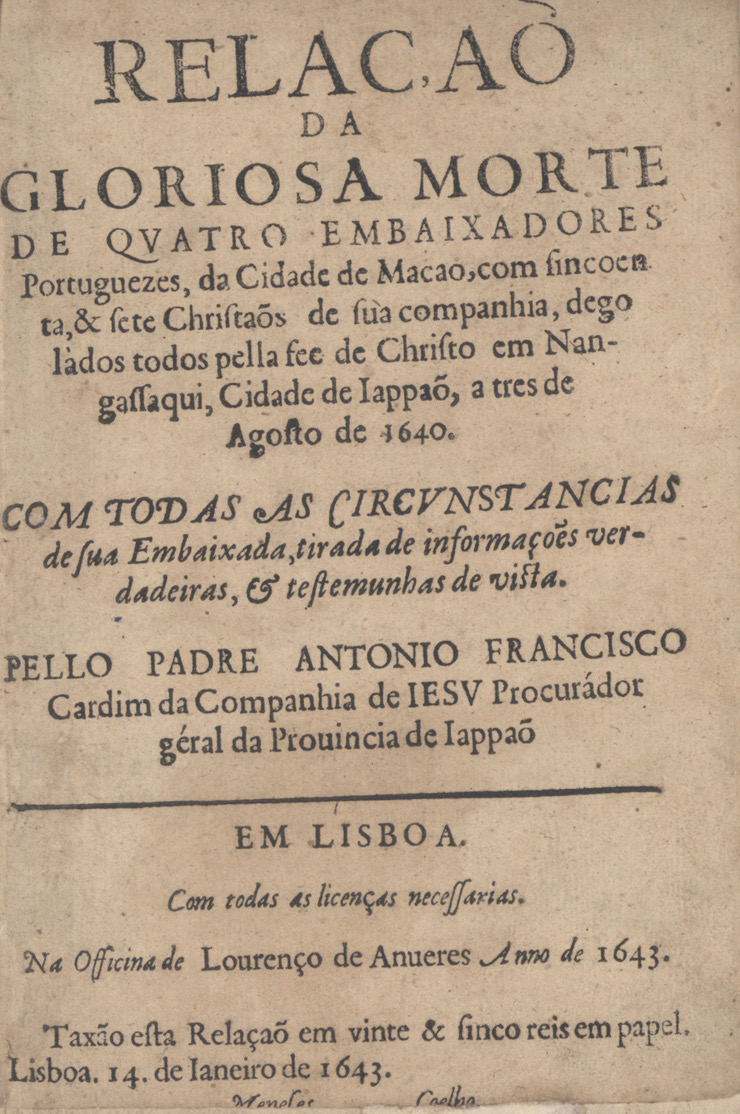
- Front page of the 1643 book "Report of the Glorious Death of Four Portuguese Ambassadors from the City of Macau, with Fifty-seven Christians of their Delegation." by António Francisco Cardim
- Native name: ポルトガル使節団長崎受難事件
- Date: 6 July – 4 August 1640
- Location: Nagasaki, Japan
- Type: Diplomatic mission
- Organised by: Senate of Macau
- Participants: 74 crew (including 4 ambassadors)
- Outcome: Embassy seized
- Casualties: 61 executed
- Deaths: Luís Pais Pacheco (executed); Rodrigo Sanches de Paredes (executed); Gonçalo Monteiro de Carvalho (executed); Simão Vaz de Pavia (executed)
- Also known as "Martyr Embassy" (Portuguese: Embaixada Mártir)

The 1640 Macau embassy to Nagasaki (ポルトガル使節団長崎受難事件) (Portuguese: Embaixada Mártir) was a diplomatic mission dispatched by the Senate of Macau to Nagasaki in July 1640. Its purpose was to try and reverse the Tokugawa shogunate's decision to end nearly a century of Portuguese trade in Japan in 1639.

The ban followed the Shimabara Rebellion, which the shogunate incorrectly blamed the Portuguese for aiding through the smuggling of supplies and missionaries. Since Macau's economy relied on the annual trade with Japan, the city's assembly resolved on March 13, 1640, to dispatch four ambassadors, Luís Pais Pacheco, Rodrigo Sanches de Paredes, Gonçalo Monteiro de Carvalho and Simão Vaz de Paiva, along with sailors and slaves, totaling 74 crew. All participants knew that the risk of death was almost certain.

The embassy's vessel arrived at Nagasaki on July 6, 1640, however, all of the delegation members were imprisoned and detained on Dejima by Kagazume Minbu and Nonoyama Shinbei while their appeals were sent to Edo. On 3–4 August 1640, 61 members of the mission, including all four ambassadors, were beheaded on Martyrs' Mount in Nagasaki, and their ship was burned in the harbor. 13 men were spared and sent back to Macau on 1 September to deliver the message of the embassy's fate.

== Bibliography ==
- Boxer, C. R. (1951). The Christian Century in Japan: 1549–1650. University of California.
- de Sousa, Lúcio (2019). The Portuguese Slave Trade in Early Modern Japan: Merchants, Jesuits and Japanese, Chinese, and Korean Slaves. Vol. 7. Leiden: Brill. ISBN 9789004388079.
- Matsutake, Hideo (1989). "寛永17年 (1640) ポルトガル使節団長崎受難事件 (2)" [A Study on the Execution of Portages Ambassadors in Nagasaki in the 17th year of Kanei (1640. A. D.)]. 經營と經濟. 68 (4): 45–91. ISSN 0286-9101.
- Simões, João Carlos dos Santos (2016). As Relações Luso‑Nipónicas durante a Época Nanban (PDF) (Thesis). University of Coimbra.
