= Ansei Treaties =

1858 series of Japanese treaties

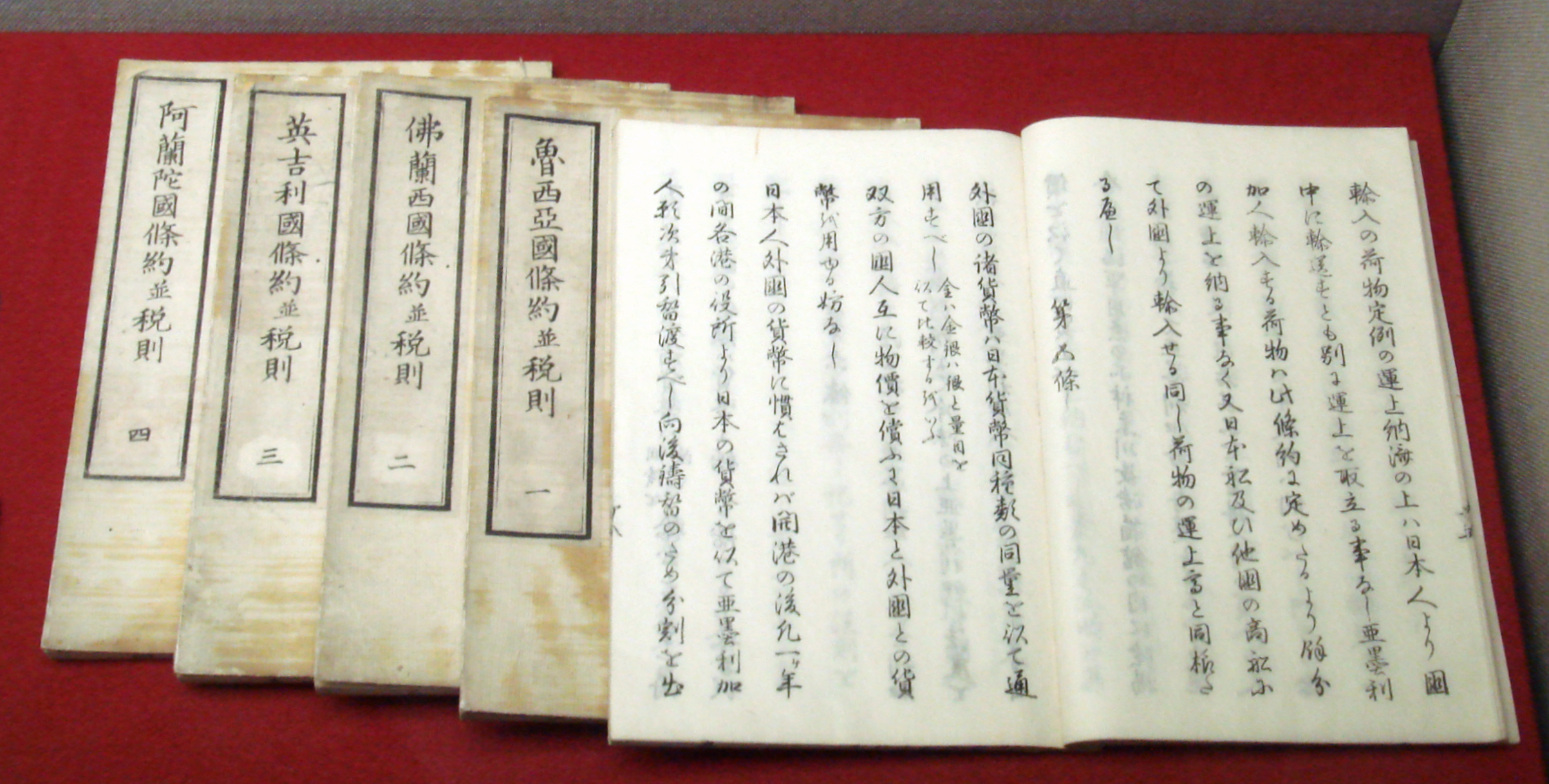
Treaties of Amity and Commerce between Japan and the United States, Russia, France, the United Kingdom and the Netherlands, 1858.

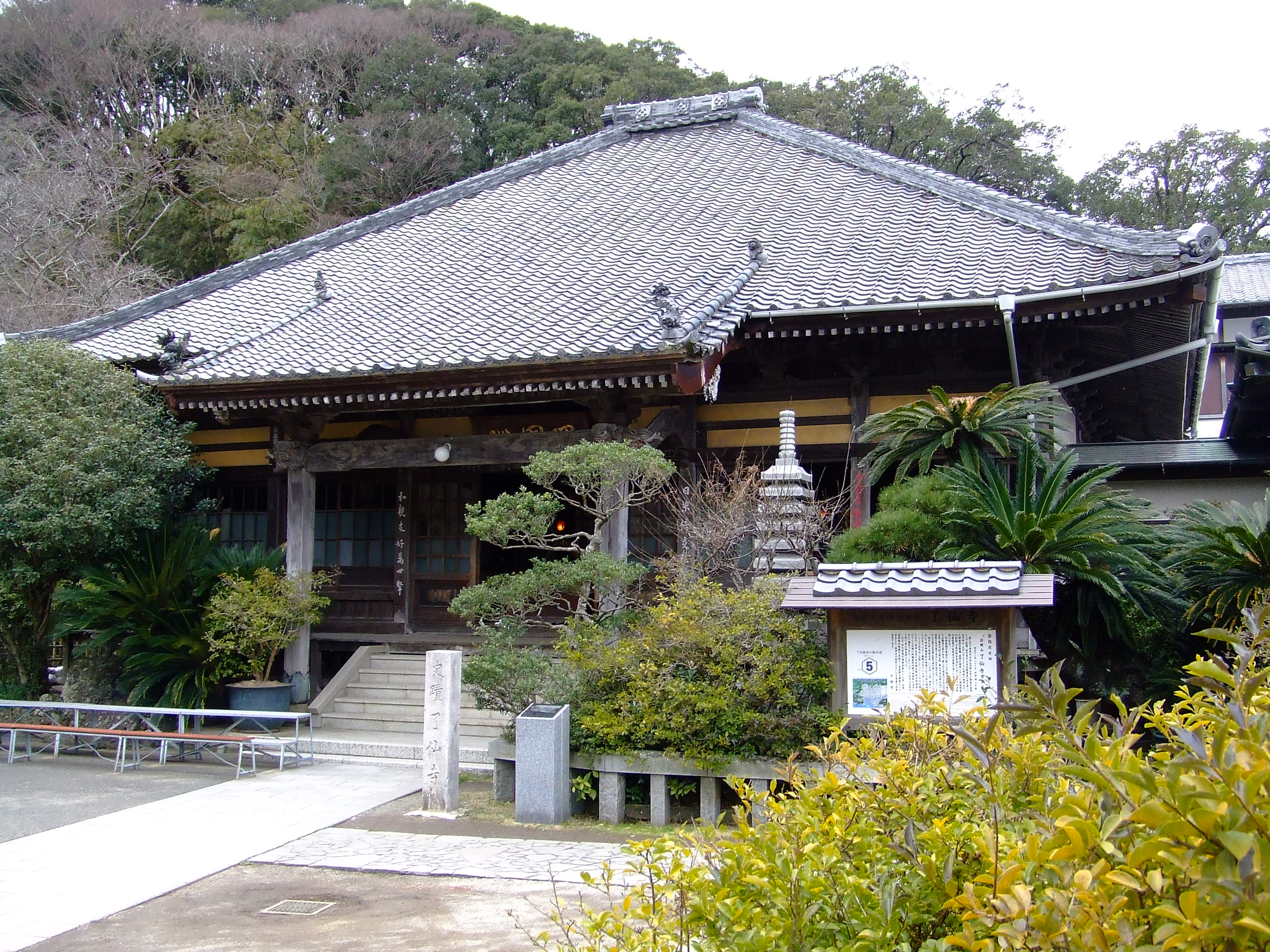
The Ryōsen-ji Temple in Shimoda, where the US-Japan Treaty of Amity and Commerce, the first of the Ansei Treaties, was signed in July 1858.

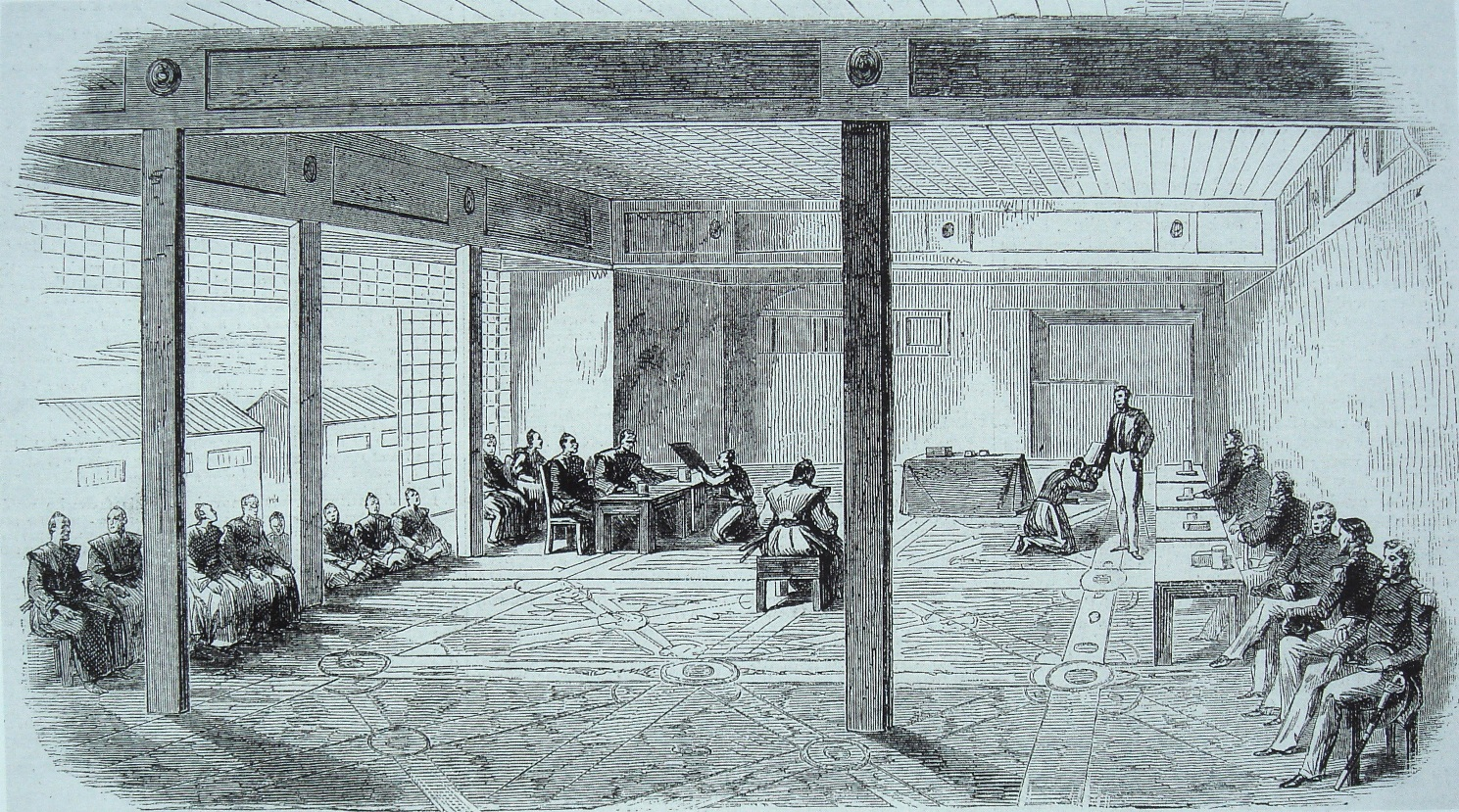
Signature of the Franco-Japanese treaty in October 1858 in Edo, the last of the Ansei Treaties to be signed.

The Ansei Treaties (Japanese: 安政条約) or the Ansei Five-Power Treaties (Japanese: 安政五カ国条約) are a series of treaties signed in 1858, during the Japanese Ansei era, between Japan on the one side, and the United States, Great Britain, Russia, Netherlands and France on the other. The first treaty, also called the Harris Treaty, was signed by the United States in July 1858, with France, Russia, Britain and the Netherlands quickly followed within the year: Japan applied to the other nations the conditions granted to the United States under the "most favoured nation" provision.

== Content ==
The most important points of these unequal treaties are:

- Exchange of diplomatic agents.
- Edo, Kobe, Nagasaki, Niigata, and Yokohama’s opening to foreign trade as ports.
- Ability of foreign citizens to live and trade at will in those ports (only the opium trade was prohibited).
- A system of extraterritoriality that provided for the subjugation of foreign residents to the laws of their own consular courts instead of the Japanese legal system.
- Fixed low import-export duties, subject to international control, thus preventing the Japanese government from asserting control over foreign trade and protection of national industries (the rate would go as low as 5% in the 1860s.)

== Components ==
The five treaties known collectively as the Ansei Treaties were:

- The Treaty of Amity and Commerce between the United States and Japan (Harris Treaty) on July 29, 1858.
- The Treaty of Amity and Commerce between the Netherlands and Japan on August 18, 1858.
- The Treaty of Amity and Commerce between Russia and Japan on August 19, 1858.
- The Anglo-Japanese Treaty of Amity and Commerce on August 26, 1858.
- The Treaty of Amity and Commerce between France and Japan on October 9, 1858.

== In popular culture ==
The 1976 Broadway musical Pacific Overtures, which focuses on Japan during and after the Perry Expedition, includes a song titled "Please Hello" which satirically depicts the coercive process by which imperial powers forced Japan to agree to the Ansei Treaties.

== See also ==
- List of treaties

== See also ==
- France-Japan relations (19th century)
