= Anglo-Japanese Treaty of Amity and Commerce =

1858 treaty between the United Kingdom and Japan

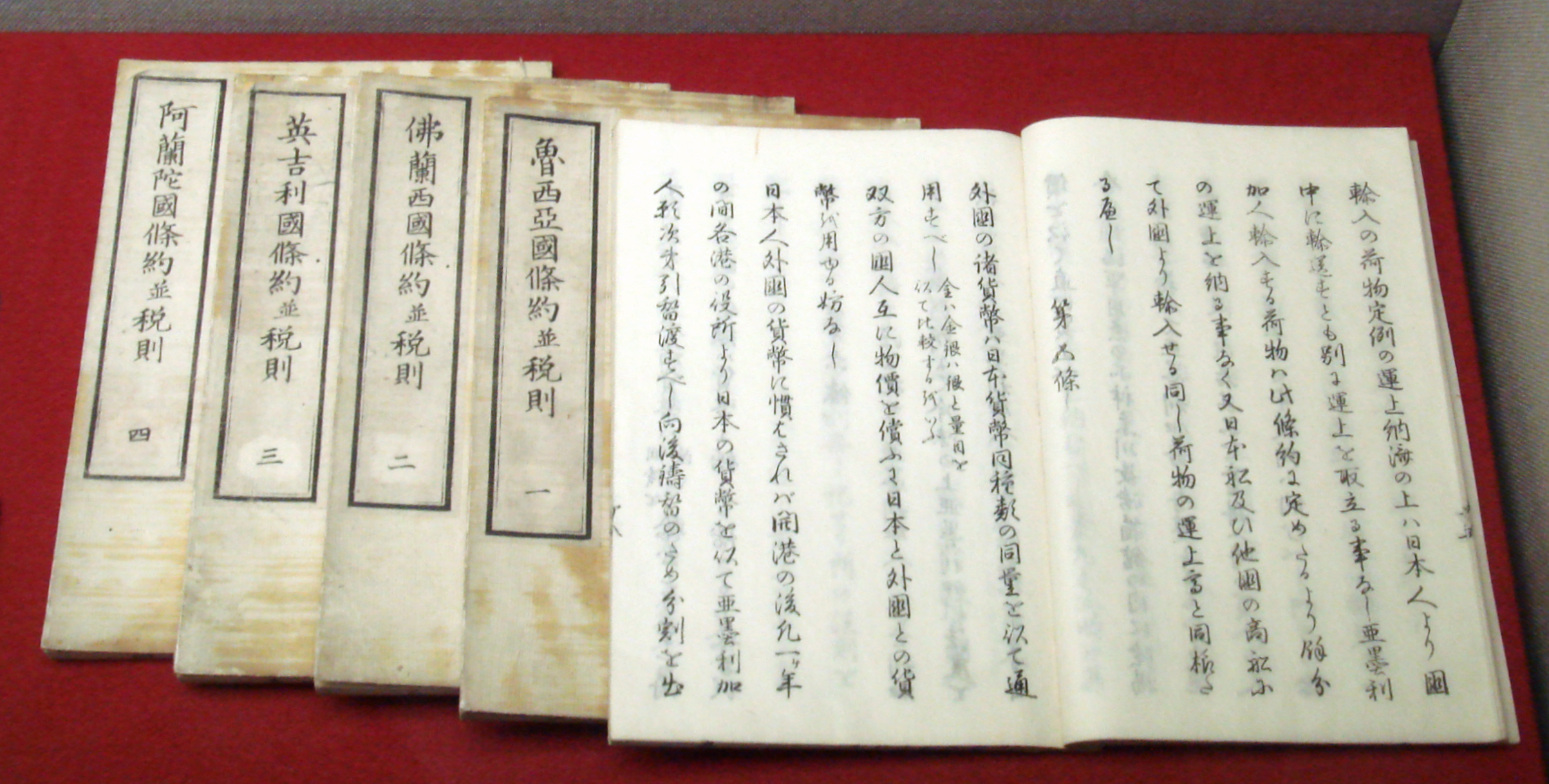
Published version of the Treaties of Amity and Commerce between Japan and Netherlands, Britain, France, Russia and the United States, 1858

The Anglo–Japanese Treaty of Amity and Commerce (日英修好通商条約, Nichi-Ei Shūkō Tsūshō Jōyaku, The Treaty of Peace, Friendship and Commerce, between Queen Victoria and the tycoon of Japan) was signed on 26 August 1858 by Lord Elgin and the then representatives of the Japanese government (the Tokugawa shogunate), and was ratified between Queen Victoria and the Tycoon of Japan at Yedo on 11 July 1859.

The concessions which Japan made in the treaty were threefold:

- A representative of the British government would be permitted to reside at Edo.
- Hakodate, Kanagawa and Nagasaki were to be opened to British commerce on 1 July 1859 and British subjects could travel within a range of 25 miles of each port. Hyogo would open on 1 January 1863.
- British subjects would be allowed to reside in Edo from 1 January 1862 and Osaka from 1 January 1863.

== About this ratification ==
The London Gazette published on 4 March 1859 says, "a Treaty of Peace, Friendship, and Commerce hath been agreed upon and concluded between Her Majesty and His Majesty the Tycoon of Japan, which was signed by the respective Plenipotentiaries of their said Majesties on the twenty-sixth day of August last: And whereas immediately upon and from the exchange of the ratifications of the said Treaty, Her Majesty will have power and jurisdiction in the dominions of the Tycoon of Japan ".

== See also ==
- Anglo-Japanese Alliance
- Ansei Treaties
- Japan-United Kingdom relations
- Harris Treaty
- Lord Elgin
