= France–Japan relations (19th century) =

19th century Franco–Japanese relations
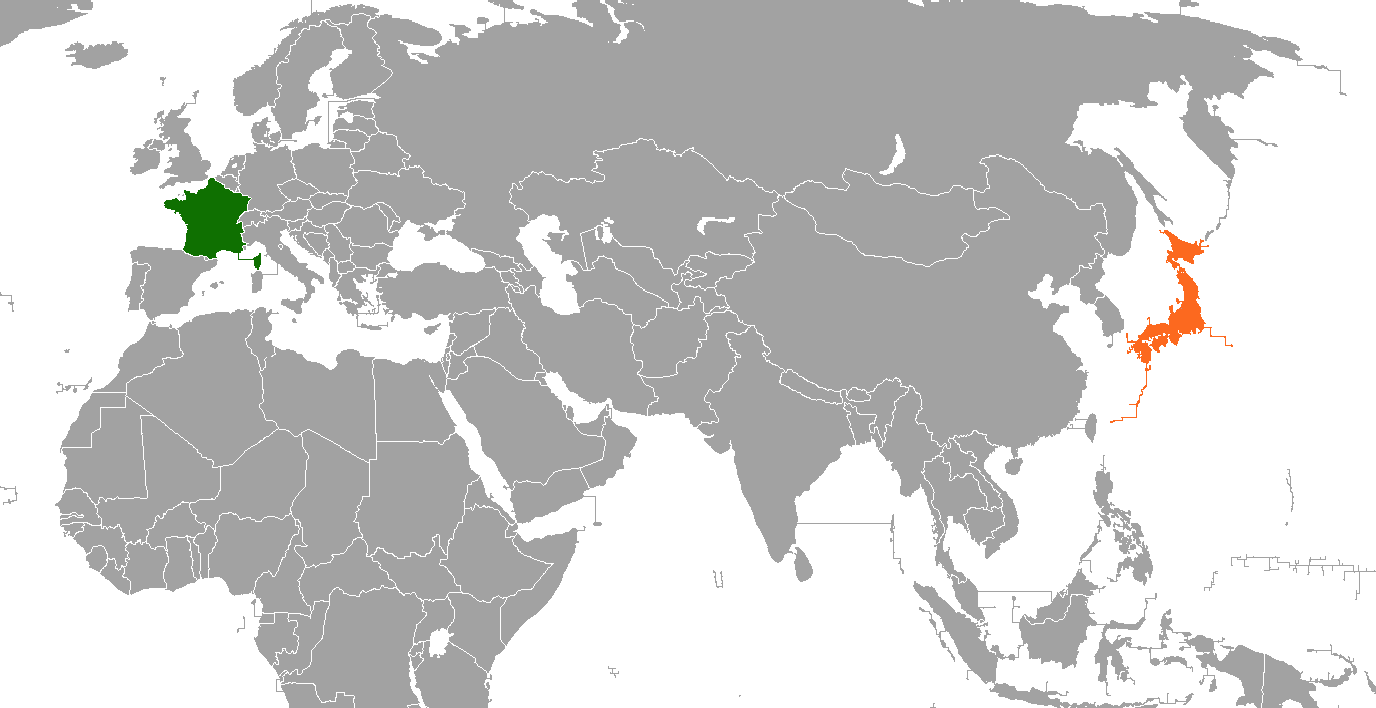
- France: Japan

The development of France–Japan relations in the 19th century coincided with Japan's opening to the Western world, following two centuries of seclusion under the "Sakoku" system and France's expansionist policy in Asia. The two countries became very important partners from the second half of the 19th century in the military, economic, legal and artistic fields. The Bakufu modernized its army through the assistance of French military missions (Jules Brunet), and Japan later relied on France for several aspects of its modernization, particularly the development of a shipbuilding industry during the early years of the Imperial Japanese Navy (Emile Bertin), and the development of a legal code. France also derived part of its modern artistic inspiration from Japanese art, essentially through Japonism and its influence on Impressionism, and almost completely relied on Japan for its prosperous silk industry.

== Context ==
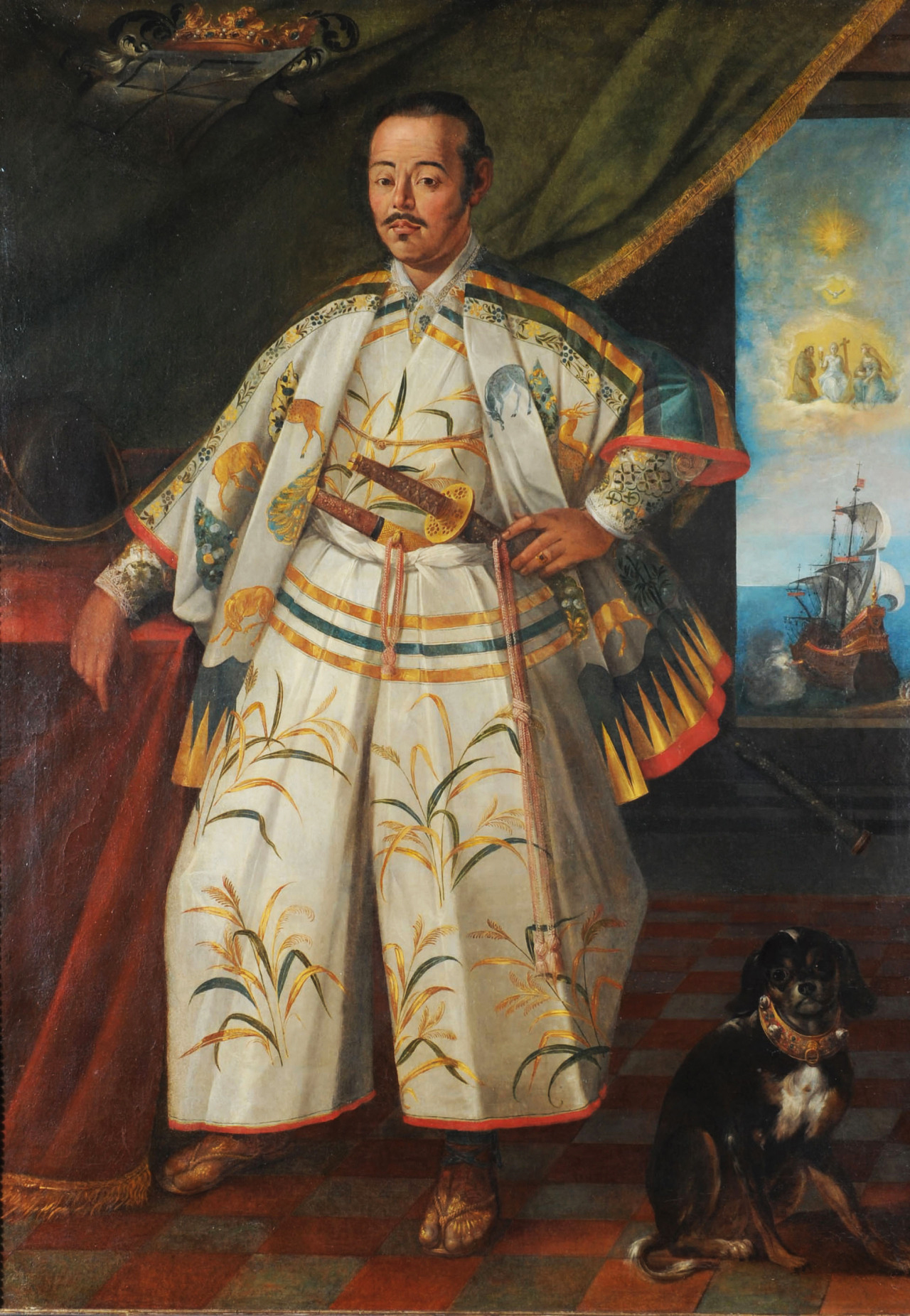
Hasekura Tsunenaga initiated France-Japan relations in 1615.

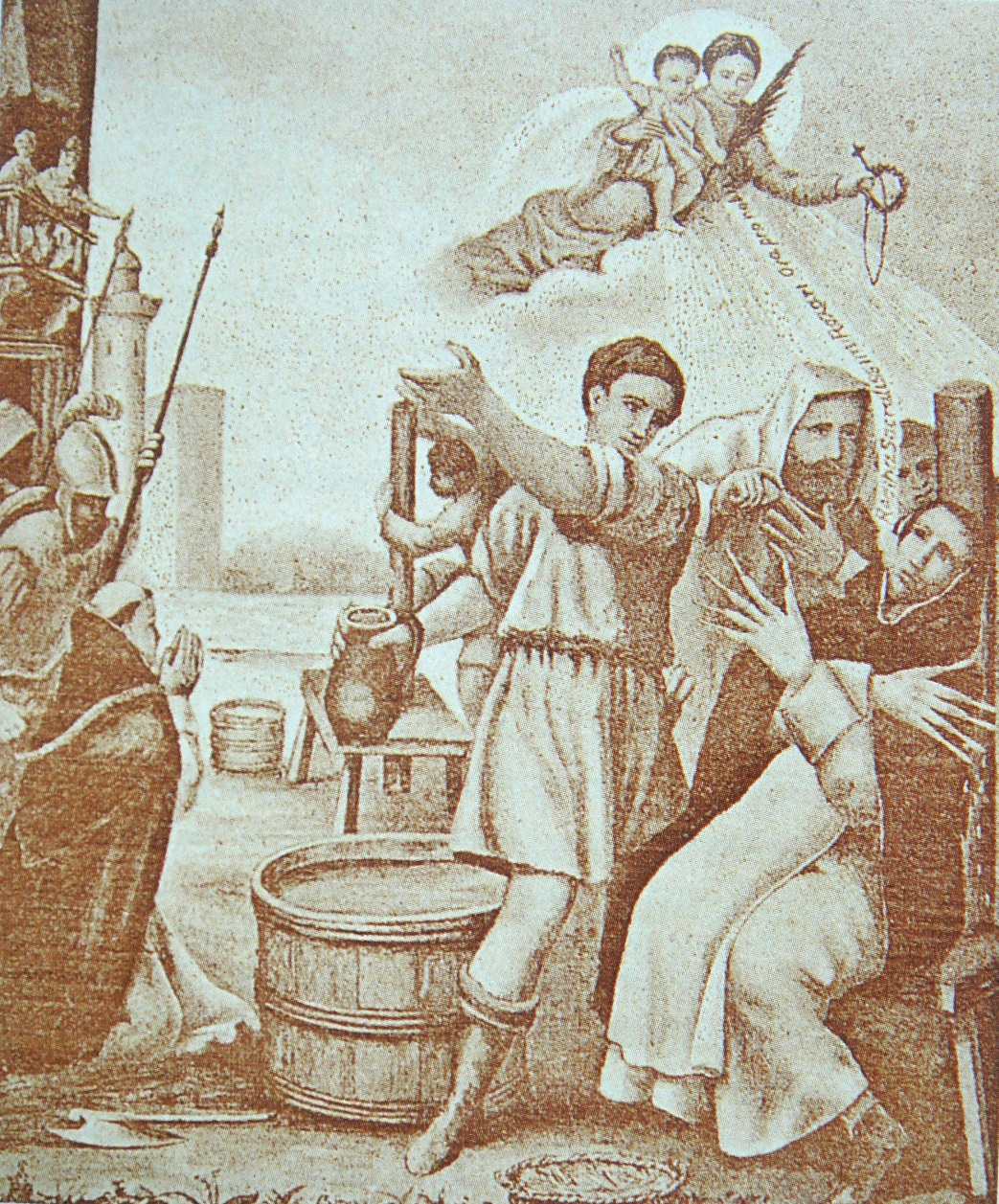
Martyrdom of the French Dominican Guillaume Courtet, in Nagasaki, 1637.

Japan had had numerous contacts with the West during the Nanban trade period in the second half of the 16th and the early 17th century. During that period, the first contacts between the French and the Japanese occurred when the samurai Hasekura Tsunenaga landed in the southern French city of Saint-Tropez in 1615. François Caron, son of French Huguenot refugees to the Netherlands, who entered the Dutch East India Company, and became the first person of French origin to set foot in Japan in 1619. He stayed in Japan for 20 years, where he became a Director for the company.

This period of contact ended with the persecution of the Christian faith in Japan, leading to a near-total closure of the country to foreign interaction. In 1636, Guillaume Courtet, a French Dominican priest, penetrated into Japan clandestinely, against the 1613 interdiction of Christianity. He was caught, tortured, and died in Nagasaki on September 29, 1637.

== Diffusion of French learning to Japan ==
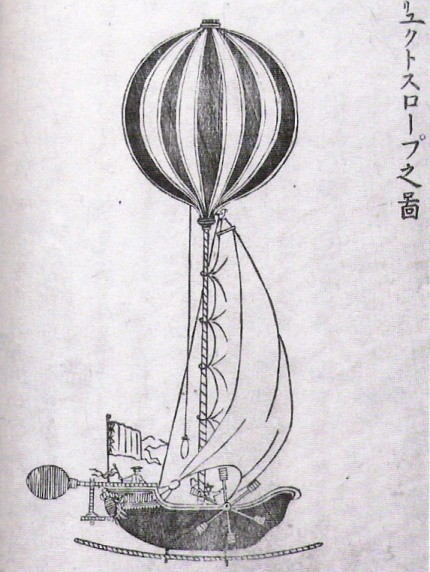
Drawing of a Western hot air balloon, from the 1787 Sayings of the Dutch.

During its period of self-imposed isolation (Sakoku), Japan acquired a tremendous amount of scientific knowledge from the West, through the process of Rangaku, in the 18th and especially the 19th century. Typically, Dutch traders in the Dejima quarter of Nagasaki would bring to the Japanese some of the latest books about Western sciences, which would be analysed and translated by the Japanese. It is widely thought that Japan had an early start towards industrialization through this medium. French scientific knowledge was transmitted to Japan through this medium.

The first flight of a hot air balloon by the brothers Montgolfier in France in 1783, was reported less than four years later by the Dutch in Dejima, and published in the 1787 Sayings of the Dutch. The new technology was demonstrated in 1805, almost twenty years later, when the Swiss Johann Caspar Horner and the Prussian Georg Heinrich von Langsdorff, two scientists of the Krusenstern mission that also brought the Russian ambassador Nikolai Rezanov to Japan, made a hot air balloon out of Japanese paper (washi), and made a demonstration in front of about 30 Japanese delegates. Hot air balloons would mainly remain curiosities, becoming the object of numerous experiments and popular depictions, until the development of military usages during the early Meiji era.

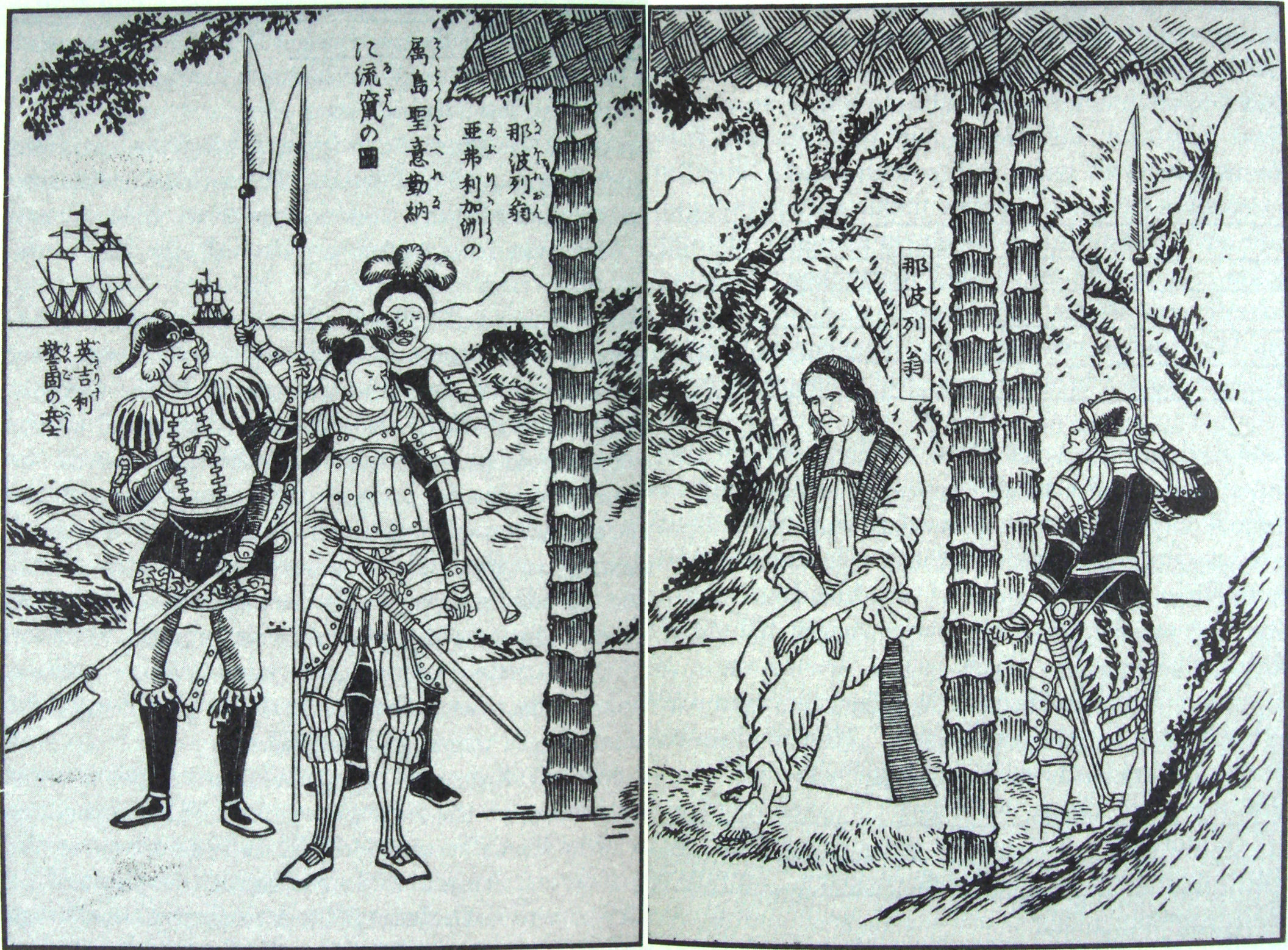
The imprisonment of Napoleon in Saint Helena, related and illustrated in a contemporary Japanese book (1815–1820).

Historical events, such as the life of Napoleon, were relayed by the Dutch and were published in contemporary Japanese books. Characteristically, some historical facts could be presented exactly (the imprisonment of Napoleon "in the African island of Saint Helena"), while others could be incorrect (such as the anachronistic depiction of the British guards wearing 16th century cuirasses and weapons.

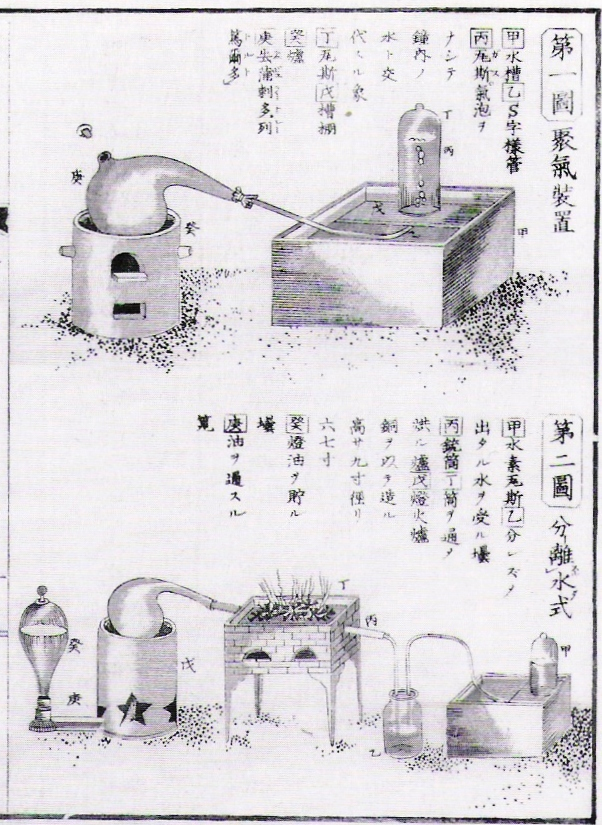
Lavoisier's chemical experiments in Udagawa's 1840 Seimi Kaisō.

In 1840, the Rangaku scholar Udagawa Yōan reported for the first time in details the findings and theories of Lavoisier in Japan. Accordingly, Udagawa also made numerous scientific experiments and created new scientific terms, which are still in current use in modern scientific Japanese, like "oxidation" (酸化, sanka), "reduction" (還元, kangen), "saturation" (飽和, hōwa), and "element" (元素, genso).

The Rangaku scholar Takeda Ayasaburō built the fortresses of Goryokaku and Benten Daiba between 1854 and 1866, using Dutch books on military architecture describing the fortification of the French architect Vauban.

Education in the French language started in 1808 in Nagasaki, when the Dutch Hendrik Doeff started to teach French to Japanese interpreters. The need to learn French was identified when threatening letters were sent by the Russian government in this language.

== First modern contacts (1844–1864) ==
=== First contacts with Okinawa (1844) ===
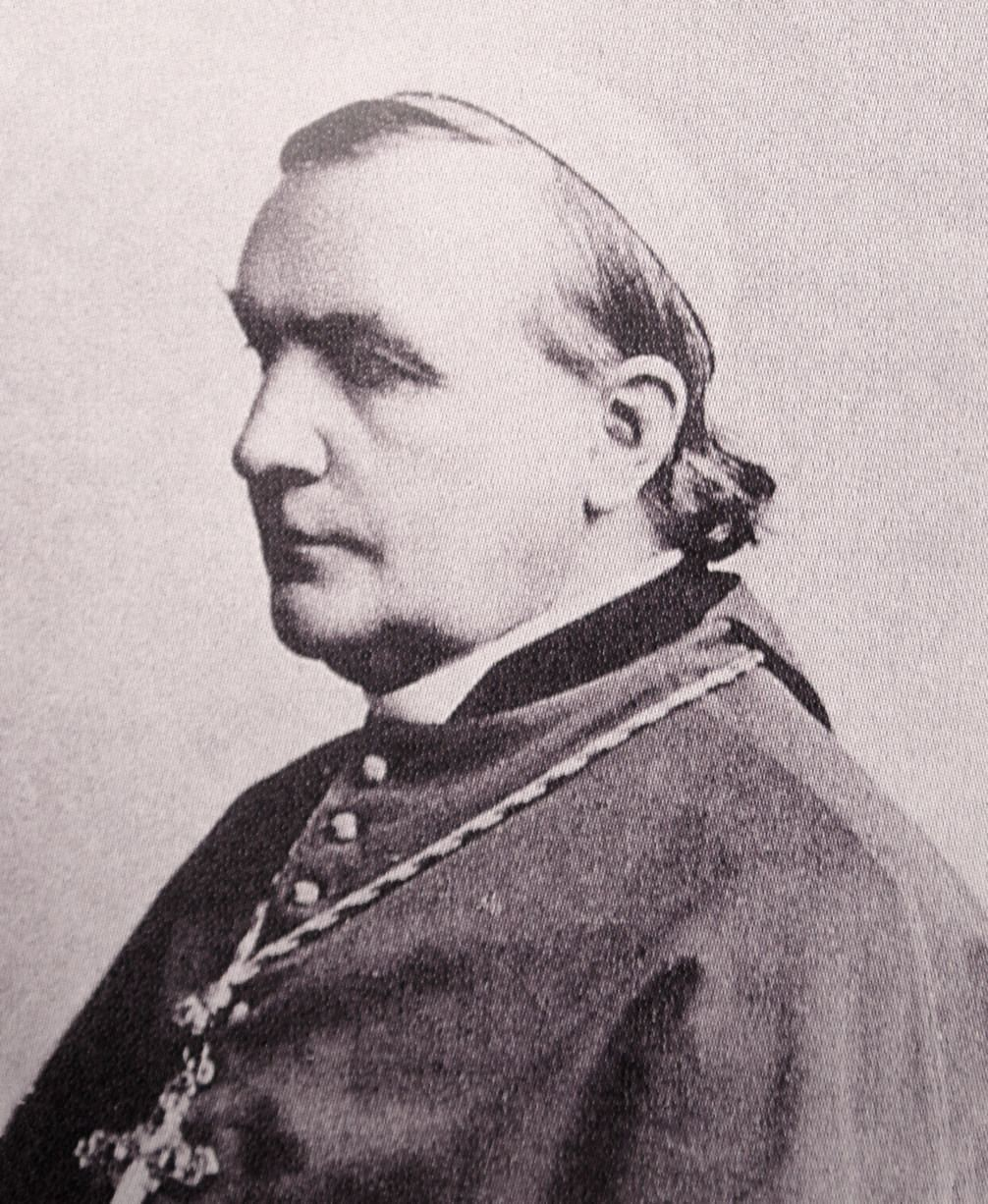
Father Forcade of the Paris Foreign Missions Society, first 19th century Christian missionary in Japan, was nominated Vicar Apostolic of Japan, by Pope Gregory XVI in 1846.

After nearly two centuries of strictly enforced seclusion, various contacts occurred from the middle of the 19th century as France was trying to expand its influence in Asia. After the signature of the Treaty of Nanking by Great Britain in 1842, both France and the United States tried to increase their efforts in the Orient.

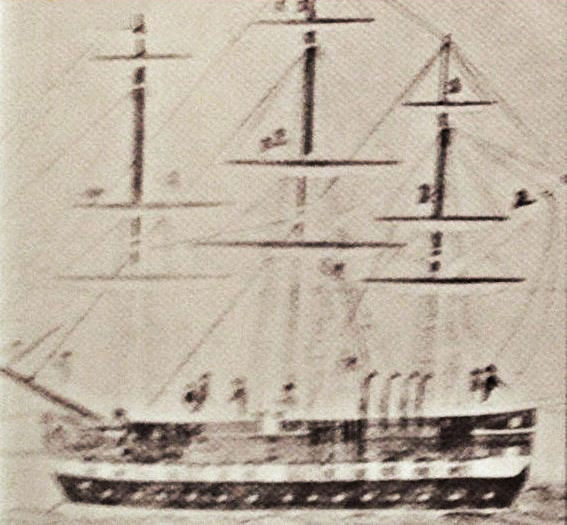
Japanese painting of one of the French ships in the Ryūkyūs in 1846.

The first contacts occurred with the Ryūkyū Kingdom (modern Okinawa), a vassal of the Japanese fief of Satsuma since 1609. In 1844, a French naval expedition under Captain Fornier-Duplan onboard Alcmène visited Okinawa on April 28, 1844. Trade was denied, but Father Forcade was left behind with a Chinese translator, named Auguste Ko. Forcade and Ko remained in the Ameku Shogen-ji Temple near the port Tomari, Naha city under strict surveillance, only able to learn the Japanese language from monks. After a period of one year, on May 1, 1846, the French ship Sabine, commanded by Guérin, arrived, soon followed by La Victorieuse, commanded by Charles Rigault de Genouilly, and Cléopâtre, under Admiral Cécille. They came with the news that Pope Gregory XVI had nominated Forcade as Bishop of Samos and Vicar Apostolic of Japan. Cécille offered to make the kingdom into a French protectorate, but his offer was rejected; the only concession he obtained was the kingdom permitting two French missionaries to stay.

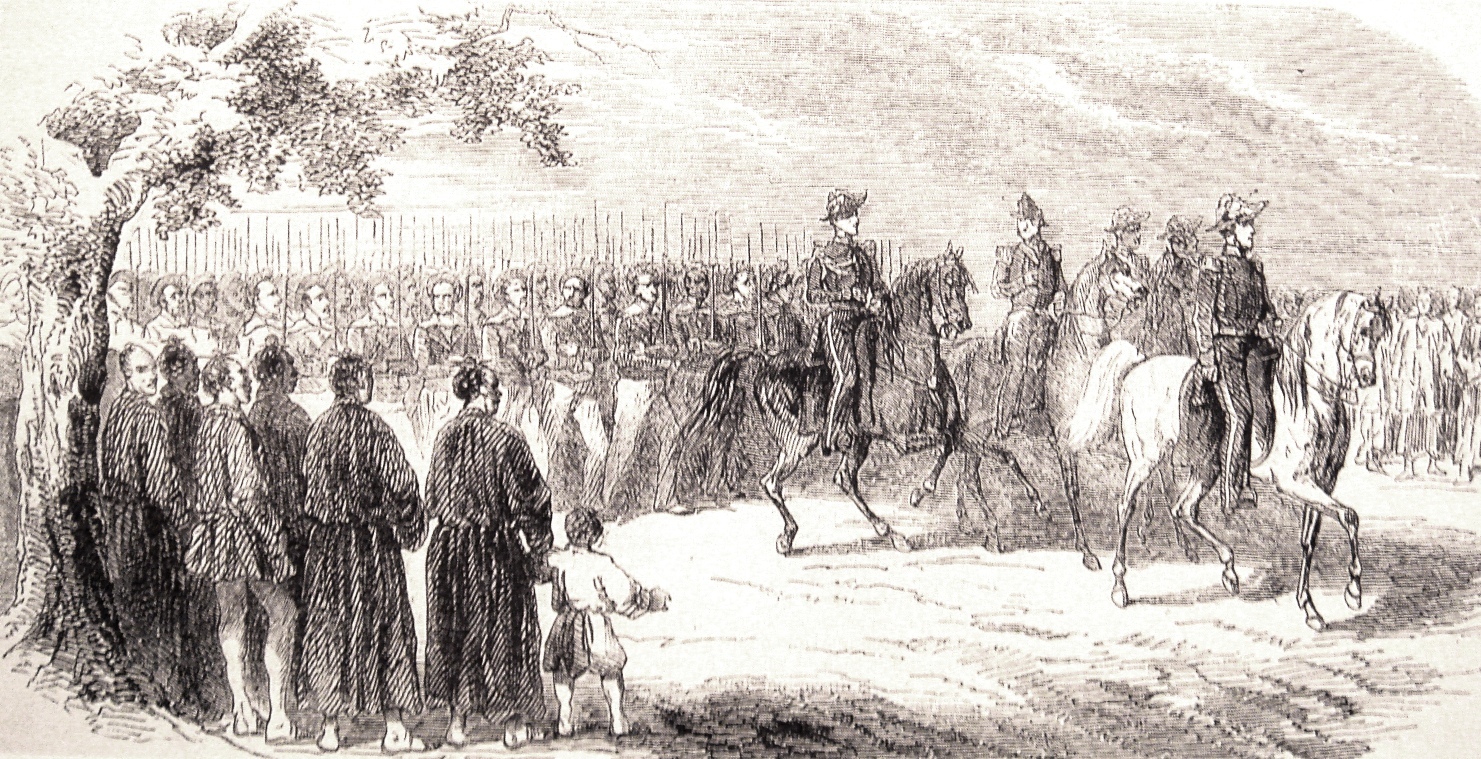
Rear-Admiral Guérin landing with his troops in Tomari in 1855.

Forcade and Ko were picked up to be used as translators in Japan, and father Leturdu was left in Tomari, soon joined by Father Mathieu Adnet. On July 24, 1846, Admiral Cécille arrived in Nagasaki, but failed in his negotiations and was denied landing, and Bishop Forcade never set foot in mainland Japan. The Ryu-Kyu court in Naha complained in early 1847 about the presence of the French missionaries, who had to be removed in 1848.

France would have no further contacts with Okinawa for the next 7 years, until news came that Commodore Perry had obtained an agreement with the islands on July 11, 1854, following his treaty with Japan. A French cruiser arrived in Shimoda in early 1855 while the USS Powhatan was still there with the ratified treaty, but was denied contacts as a formal agreement did not exist between France and Japan. France sent an embassy under Rear-Admiral Cécille onboard La Virginie in order to obtain similar advantages to those of other Western powers. A convention was signed on November 24, 1855.

=== Contacts with mainland Japan (1858) ===
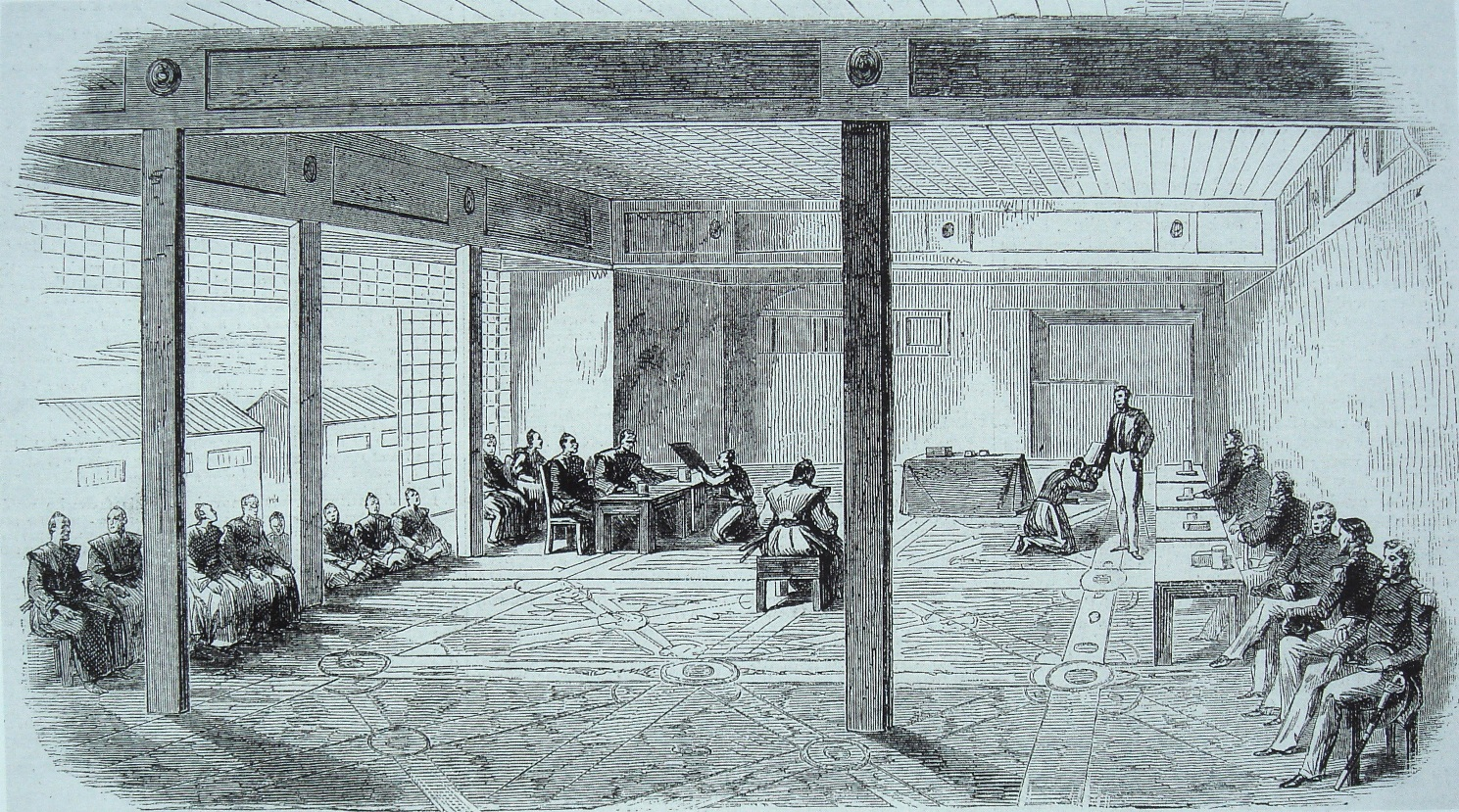
Signature of the First Franco-Japanese treaty in 1858 in Edo.

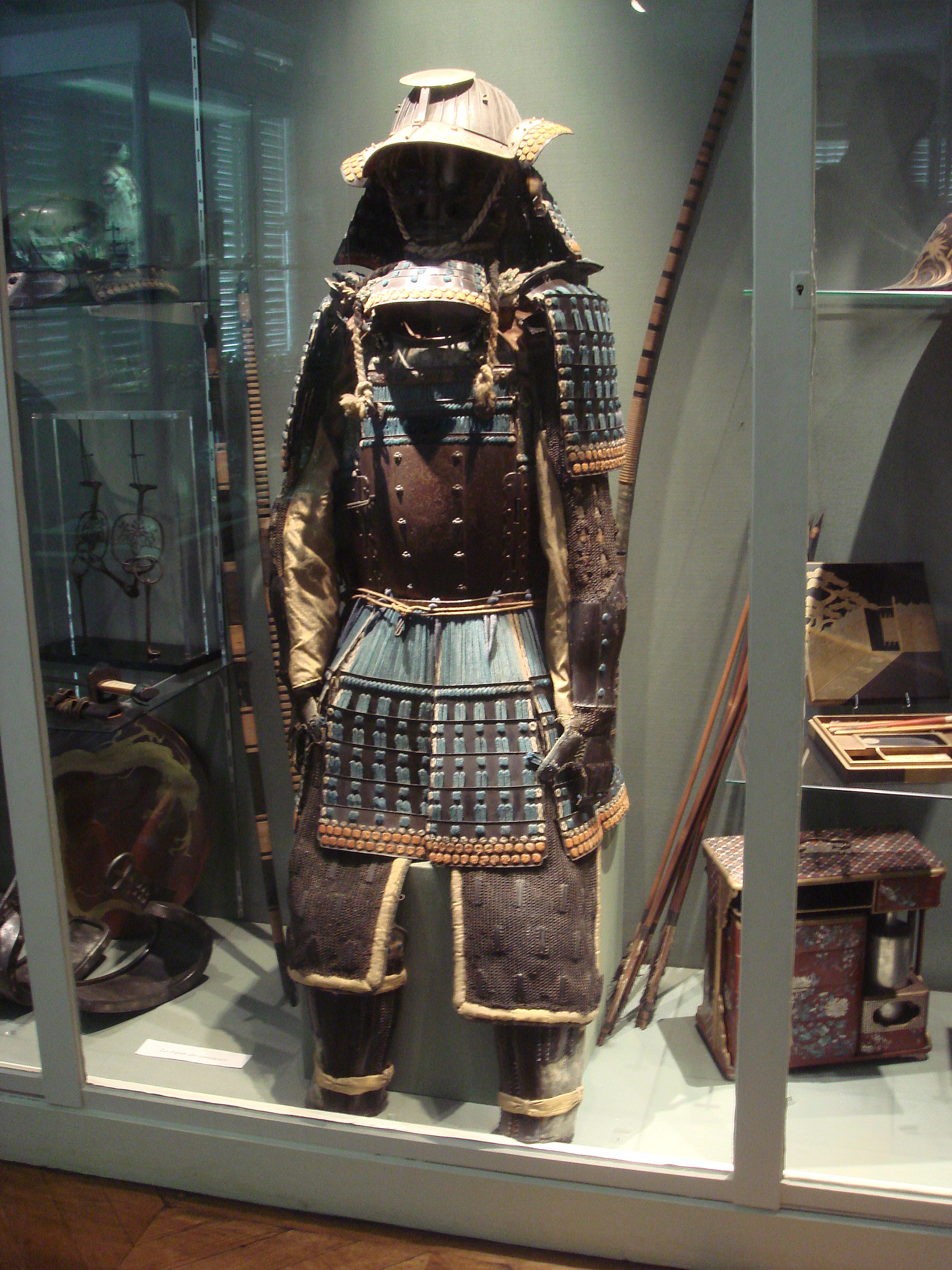
Japanese artifacts of the Chassiron collection, brought to France by the first French embassy, today at the Orbigny-Bernon Museum, La Rochelle.

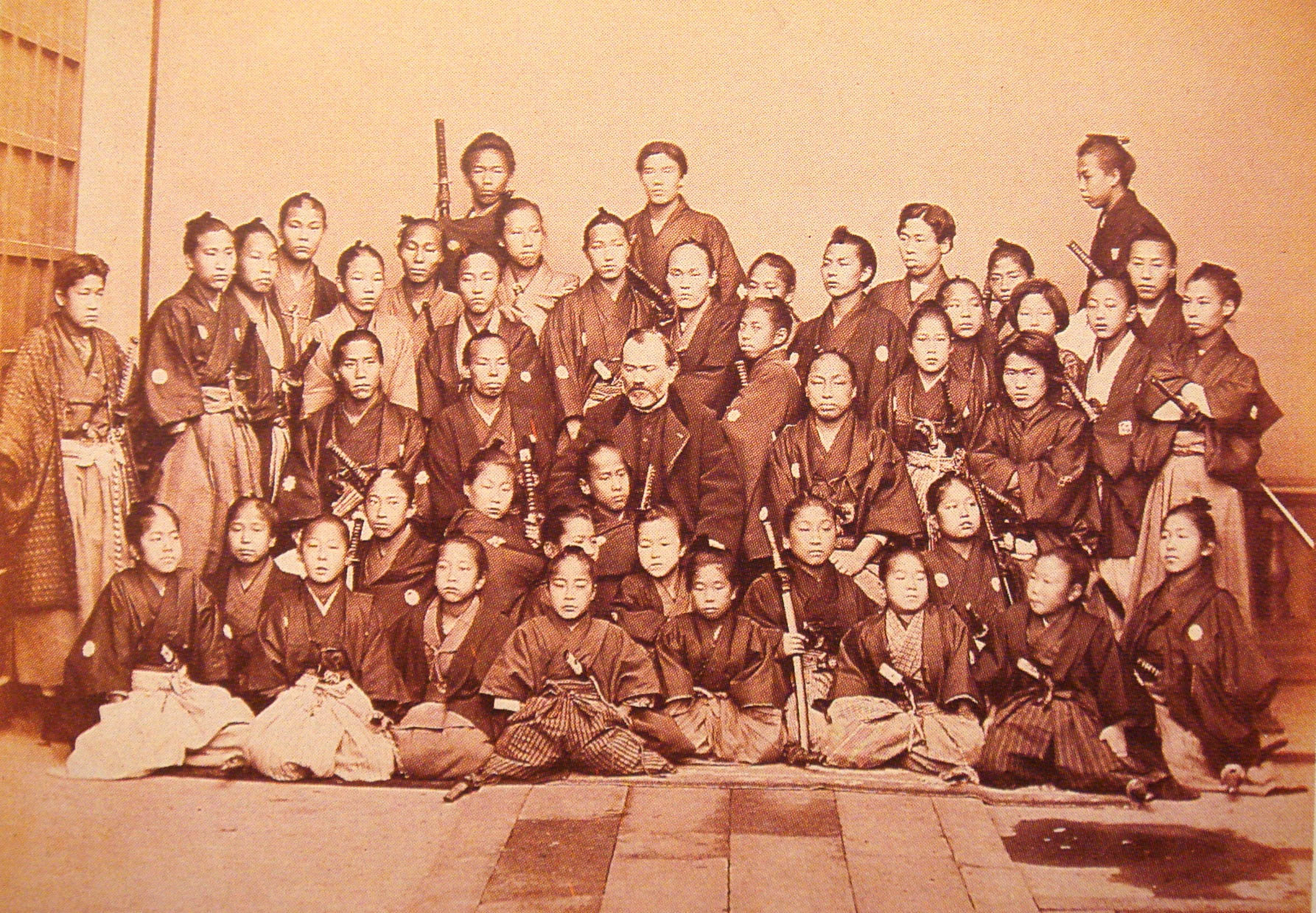
Léon Dury with his students in Nagasaki (1860s).

During the 19th century, numerous attempts by Western countries were made (other than by the Dutch, who already had a trade post in Dejima) to open trade and diplomatic relations with Japan. France made such an attempt in 1846 with the visit of Admiral Cécille to Nagasaki, but he was denied landing.

A Frenchman by the name of Charles Delprat is known to have lived in Nagasaki since about 1853, as a licensee to the Dutch trade. He was able to advise the initial French diplomatic efforts by Baron Gros in Japan. He strongly recommended against Catholic prozelitism and was influential in suppressing such intentions among French diplomats. He also presented a picture of Japan as a country which had little to learn from the West: "In studying closely the customs, the institutions, the laws of the Japanese, one concludes by asking oneself if their civilization, entirely appropriate to their country, has anything to envy in ours, or that of the United States."

The formal opening of diplomatic relations with Japan however started with the American Commodore Perry in 1852–1854, when Perry threatened to bomb Edo or blockade the country. He obtained the signature of the Convention of Kanagawa on March 31, 1854. Soon, the 1858 Chinese defeat in the Anglo-French expedition to China further gave a concrete example of Western strength to Japanese leadership.

In 1858, the Treaty of Amity and Commerce between France and Japan was signed in Edo on October 9, 1858, by Jean-Baptiste Louis Gros, the commander of the French expedition in China, opening diplomatic relations between the two countries. He was assisted by Charles de Chassiron and Alfred de Moges. In 1859, Gustave Duchesne de Bellecourt arrived and became the first French representative in Japan. A French Consulate was opened that year at the Temple of Saikai-ji, in Mita, Edo, at the same time as an American Consulate was established at the Temple of Zenpuku-ji, and a British Consulate at the Temple of Tōzen-ji.

The first trilingual Japanese dictionary incorporating French was written in 1854 by Murakami Eishun, and the first large Franco-Japanese dictionary was published in 1864. The French language was taught by Mermet de Cachon in Hakodate in 1859, or by Léon Dury in Nagasaki between 1863 and 1873. Léon Dury, who was also French Consul in Nagasaki, taught to about 50 students every year, among whom were future politicians such as Inoue Kowashi or Saionji Kinmochi.

=== Development of trade relations ===
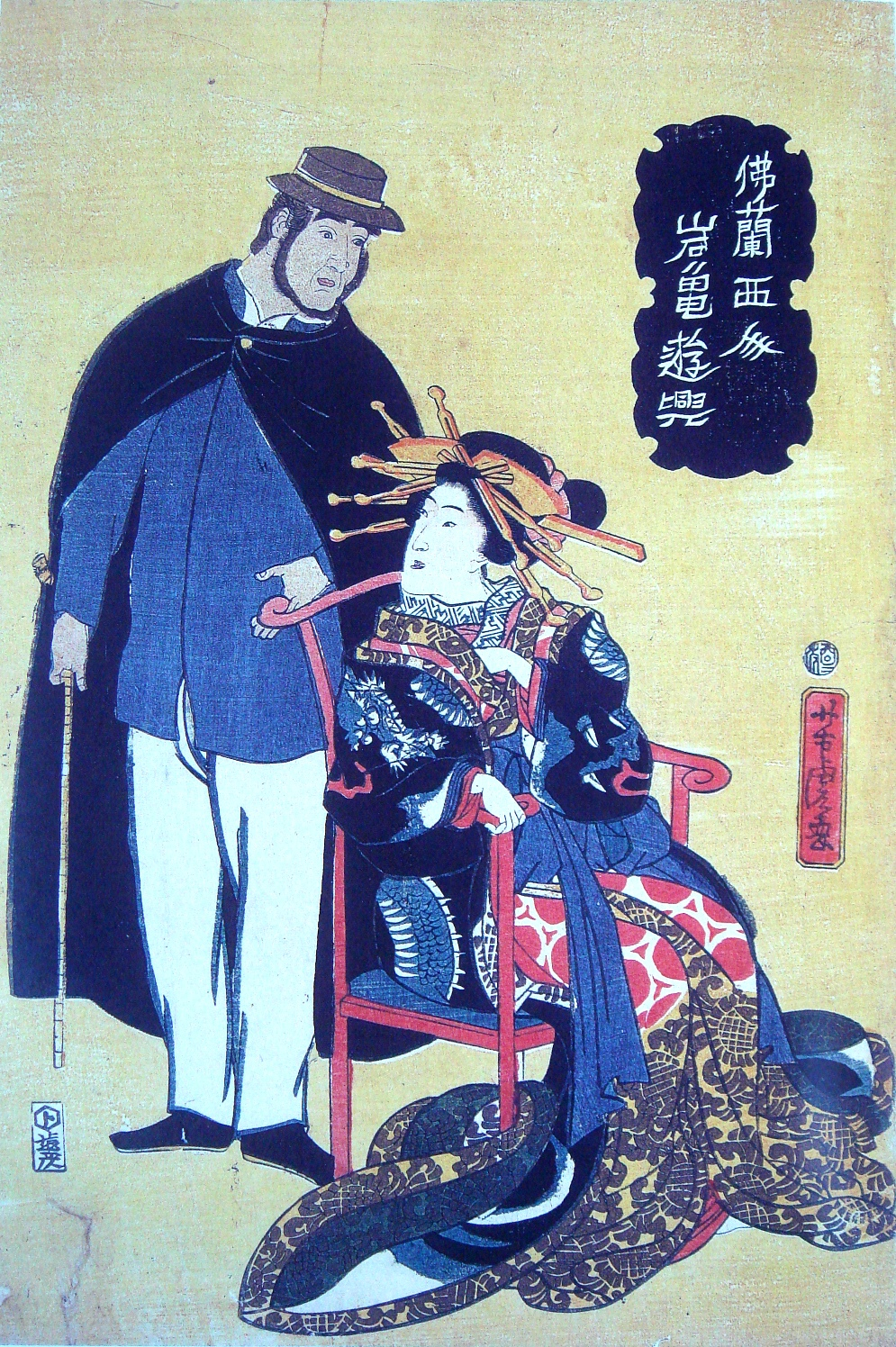
Frenchman at a brothel in 1861.

The opening of contacts between France and Japan coincided with a series biological catastrophes in Europe, as the silk industry, in which France had a leading role centered on the city of Lyon, was devastated with the appearance of various silkworm pandemics from Spain: the "tacherie" or "muscardine", the "pébrine" and the "flacherie". From 1855, France already was forced to import 61% of its raw silks. This increased to 84% in 1860. The silkworm from Japan Antheraea yamamai proved to be the only ones capable to resist to the European illnesses and were imported to France. Japanese raw silk also proved to be of the best quality on the world market.

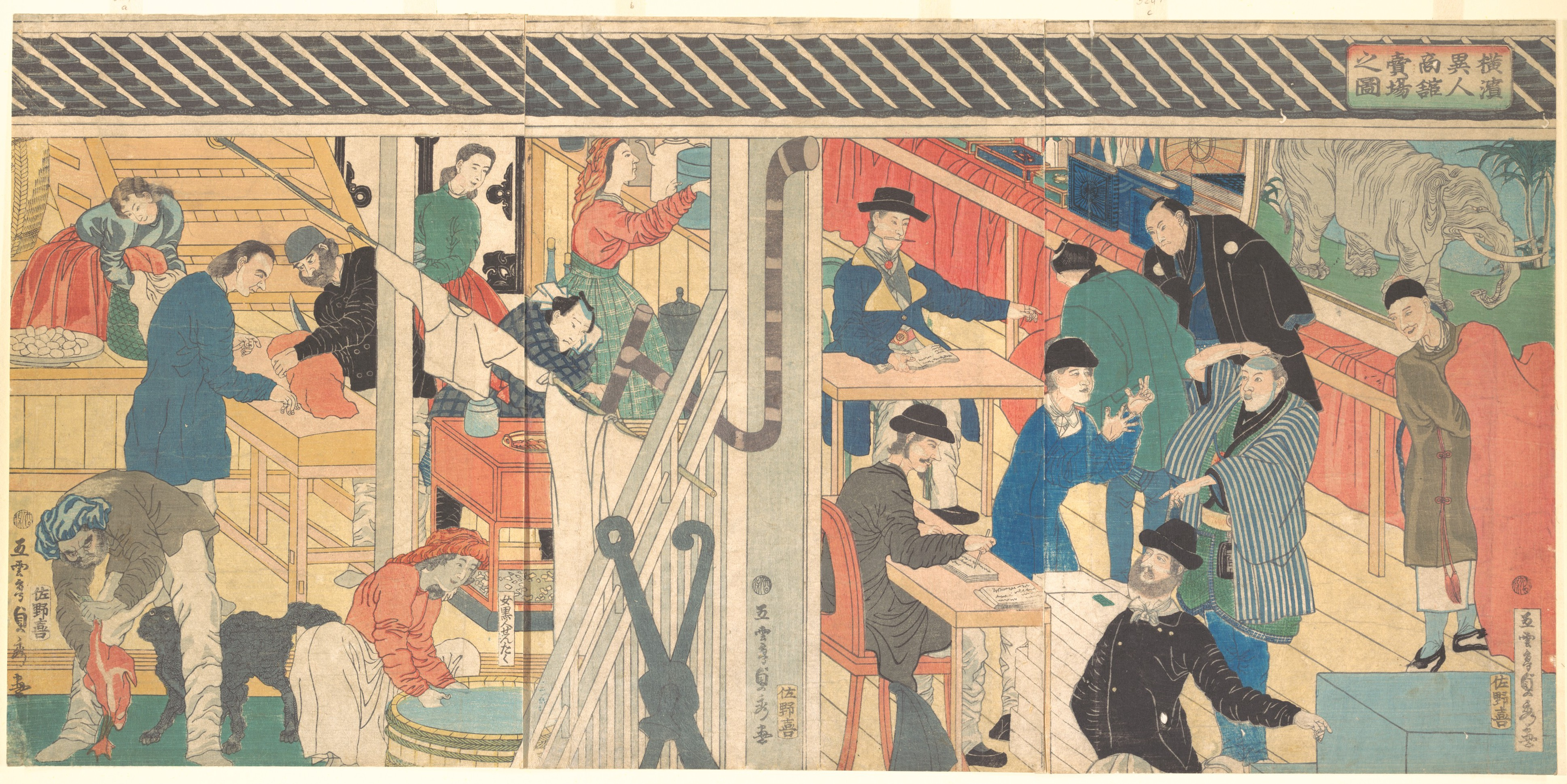
A foreign trading house in Yokohama in 1861.

Foreign silk traders started to settle in the harbour of Yokohama, and silk trade developed. In 1859, Louis Bourret, who already had been active in China, establishes in branch office in Yokohama for silk trade. From 1860, silk traders from Lyon are recorded in Yokohama, from where they immediately dispatched raw silk and silk worm eggs to France. For this early trade they relied on British shipping, and shipments transited through London to reach Lyon. As of 1862, 12 French people were installed in Yokohama, of whom 10 were traders.

=== Japanese embassies to France (1862, 1863, 1867) ===
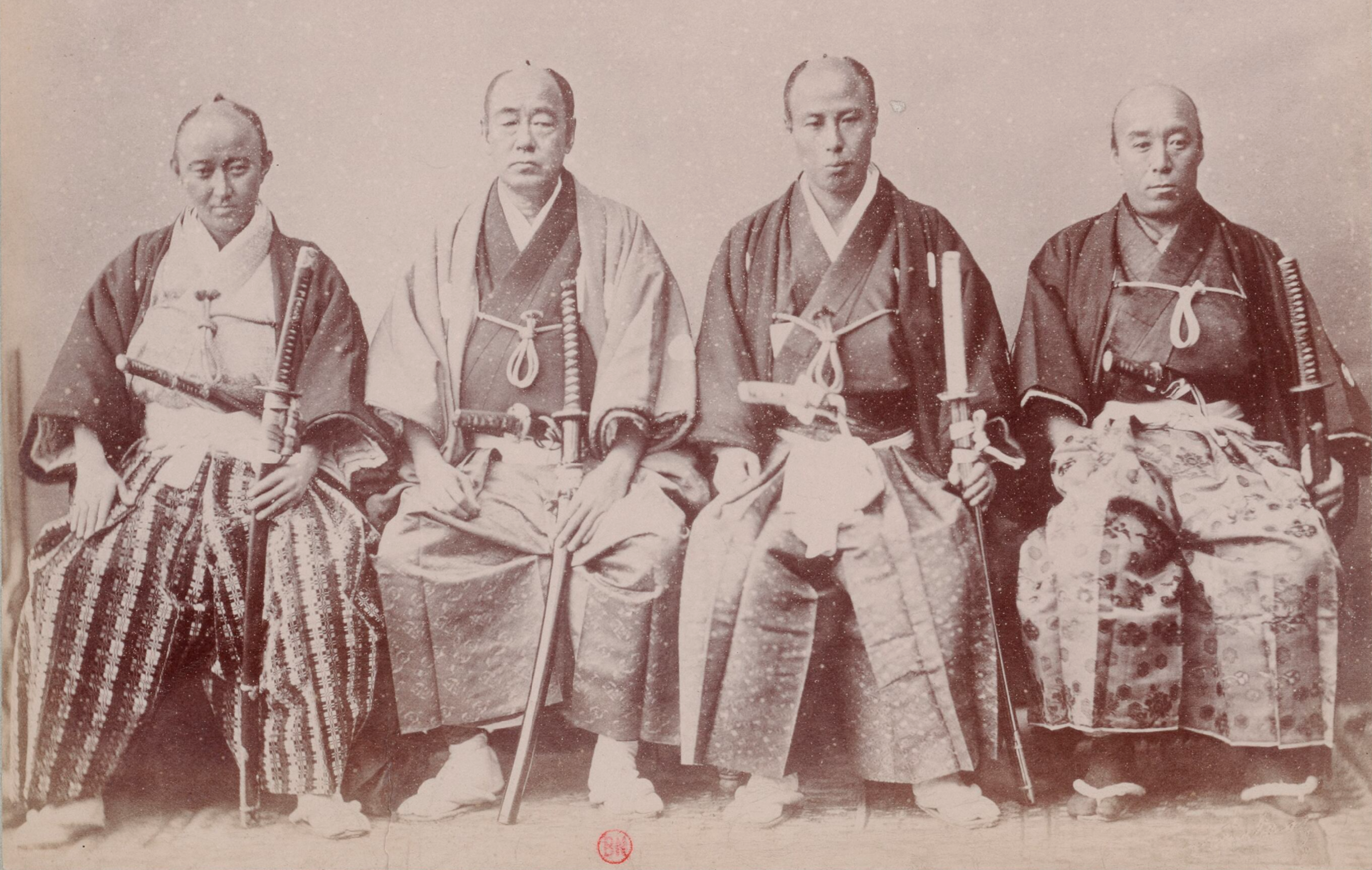
The First Japanese Embassy to Europe, in 1862, led by Takenouchi Yasunori (second from left).

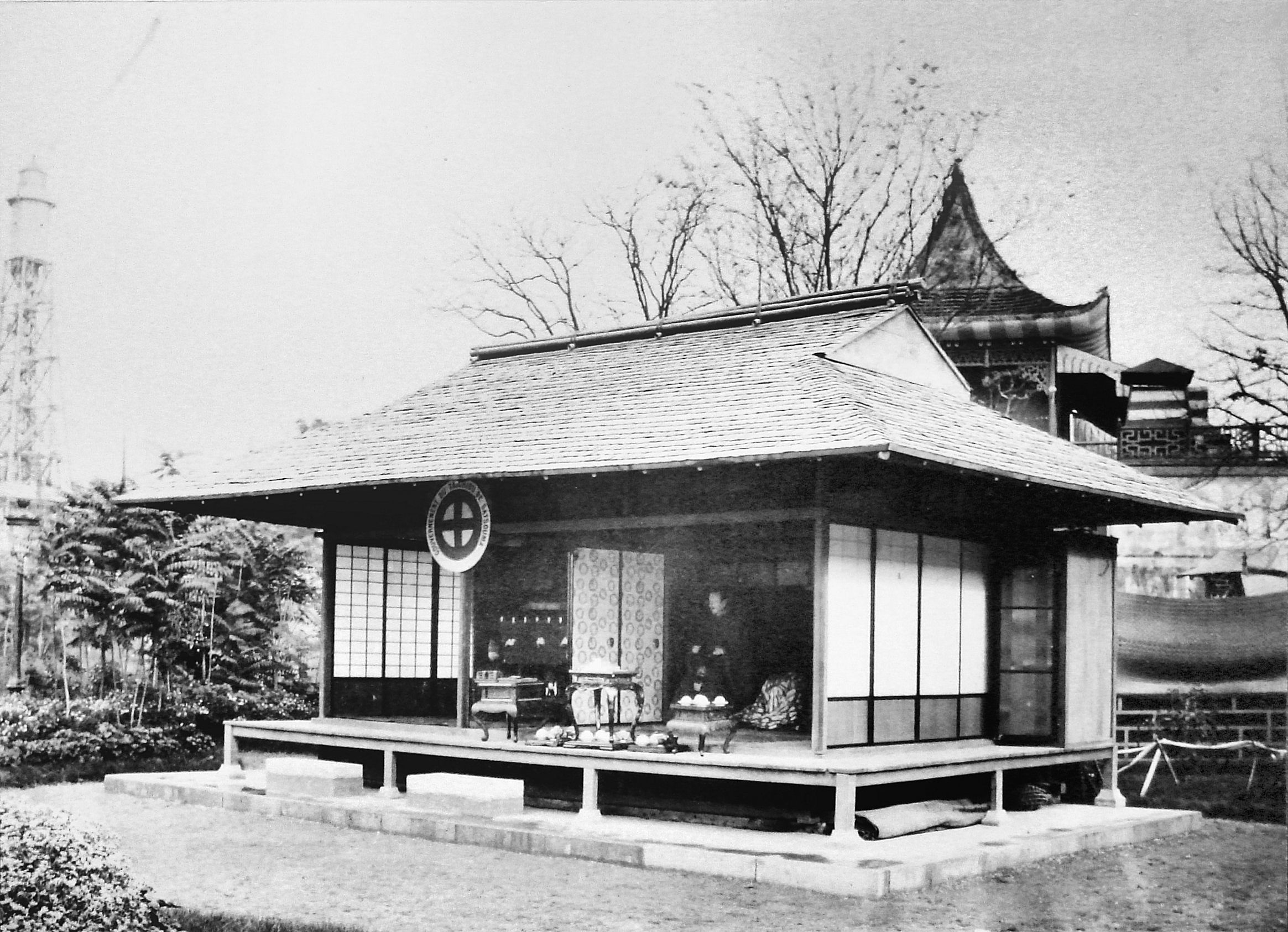
Pavilion of the "Government of Satsuma" at the Exposition Universelle in 1867 in Paris.

The Japanese soon responded to these contacts by sending their own embassies to France. The shōgun sent the First Japanese Embassy to Europe, led by Takenouchi Yasunori in 1862. The mission was sent in order to learn about Western civilization, ratify treaties, and delay the opening of cities and harbour to foreign trade. Negotiations were made in France, the UK, the Netherlands, Prussia and finally Russia. They were almost gone an entire year. On April 13, 1862, the first Japanese Minister to France delivered his credentials to Napoleon III in the Tuileries palace.

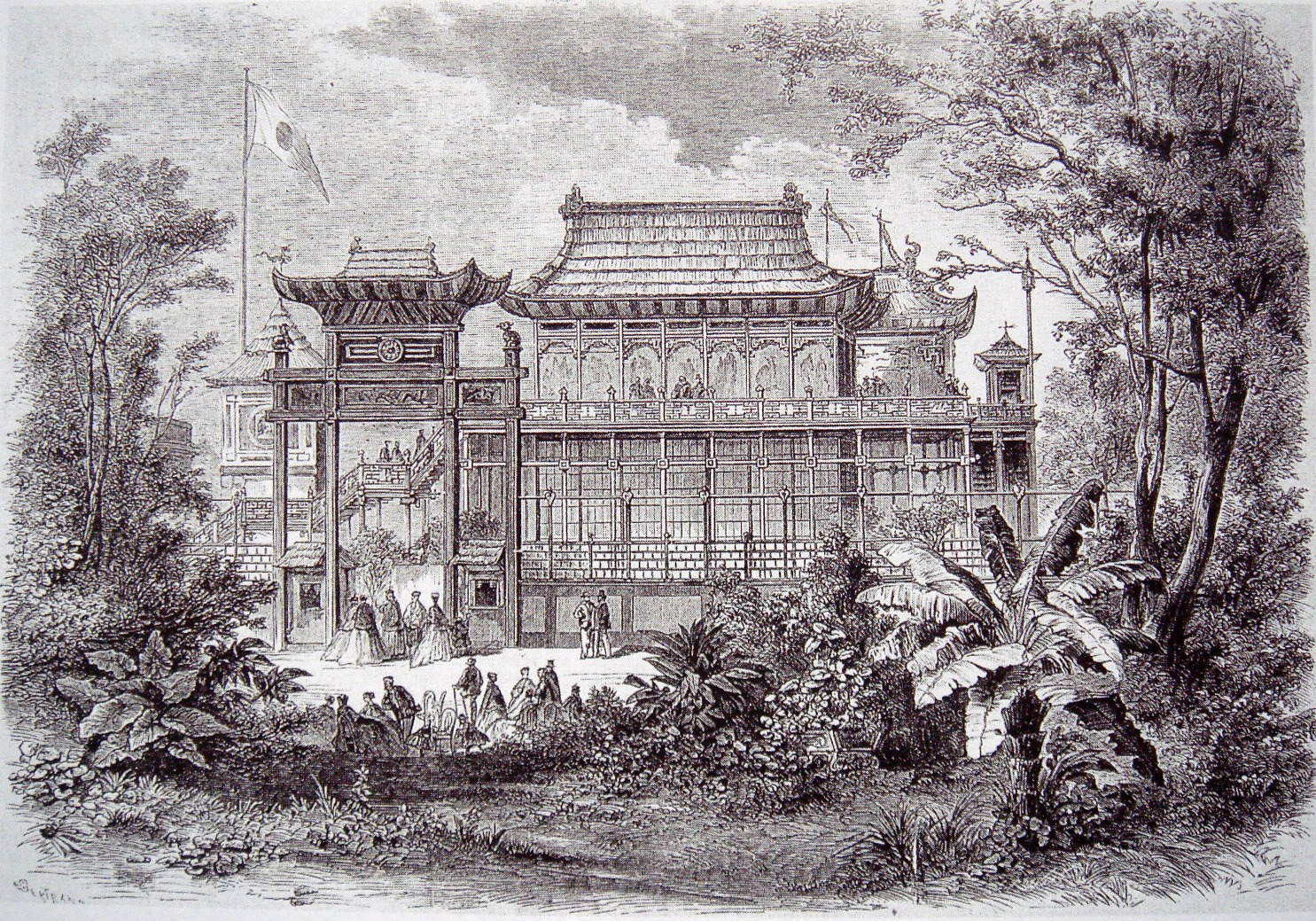
Chinese and Japanese exhibits at the 1867 World Fair.

A Second Japanese Embassy to Europe in 1863, in an effort to pay lip service the 1863 "Order to expel barbarians" (攘夷実行の勅命) an edict by Emperor Kōmei, and the Bombardment of Shimonoseki incidents, in a wish to close again the country to Western influence, and return to sakoku status. The mission negotiated in vain to obtain French agreement to the closure of the harbour of Yokohama to foreign trade.

Japan also participated to the 1867 World Fair in Paris, having its own pavilion. The fair aroused considerable interest in Japan, and allowed many visitors to come in contact with Japanese art and techniques. Many Japanese representatives visited the Fair on this occasion, including a member of the House of the shōgun, his younger brother Tokugawa Akitake. The southern region of Satsuma (a regular opponent to the Bakufu) also had a representation at the World Fair, as the suzerain of the Kingdom of Naha in the Ryu Kyu islands. The Satsuma mission was composed of 20 envoys, among them 14 students, who participated to the fair, and also negotiated the purchase of weapons and mechanical looms.

== Major exchanges at the end of the shogunate (1864–1867) ==
France decided to reinforce and formalize links with Japan by sending its second representative Léon Roches to Japan in 1864. Roches himself originated from the region of Lyon, and was therefore highly knowledgeable of the issues related to the silk industry.

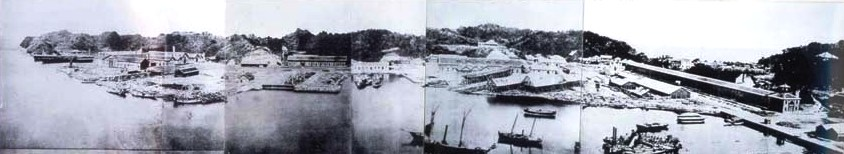
Léonce Verny directed the construction of Japan's first modern arsenal at Yokosuka from 1865.

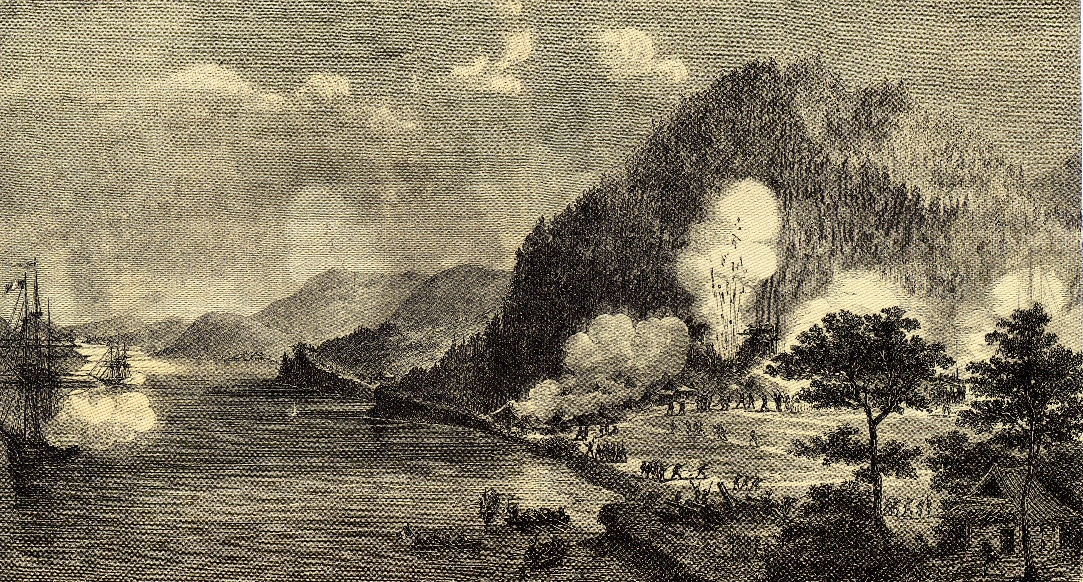
French intervention in the Bombardment of Shimonoseki, with the warships the Tancrède and the Dupleix, under Captain Benjamin Jaurès. "Le Monde Illustré", October 10, 1863.

Conversely, the shogunate wished to engage in a vast program of industrial development in many areas, and in order to finance and foster it relied on the exportations of silk and the development of local resources such as mining (iron, coal, copper, silver, gold).

Very soon relations developed at a high pace. The Japanese shogunate, wishing to obtain foreign expertise in shipping obtained the dispatch of the French engineer Léonce Verny to build the Yokosuka arsenal, Japan's first modern arsenal. Verny arrived in Japan in November 1864. In June 1865, France delivered 15 cannons to the shogunate. Verny worked together with Shibata Takenaka who visited France in 1865 to prepare for the construction of the Yokosuka (order of the machinery) arsenal and organize a French military mission to Japan. Altogether, about 100 French workers and engineers worked in Japan to establish these early industrial plants, as well as lighthouses, brick factories, and water transportation systems. These establishments helped Japan acquire its first knowledge of modern industry.

In the educational field as well, a school to train engineers was established in Yokosuka by Verny, and a Franco-Japanese College was established in Yokohama in 1865.

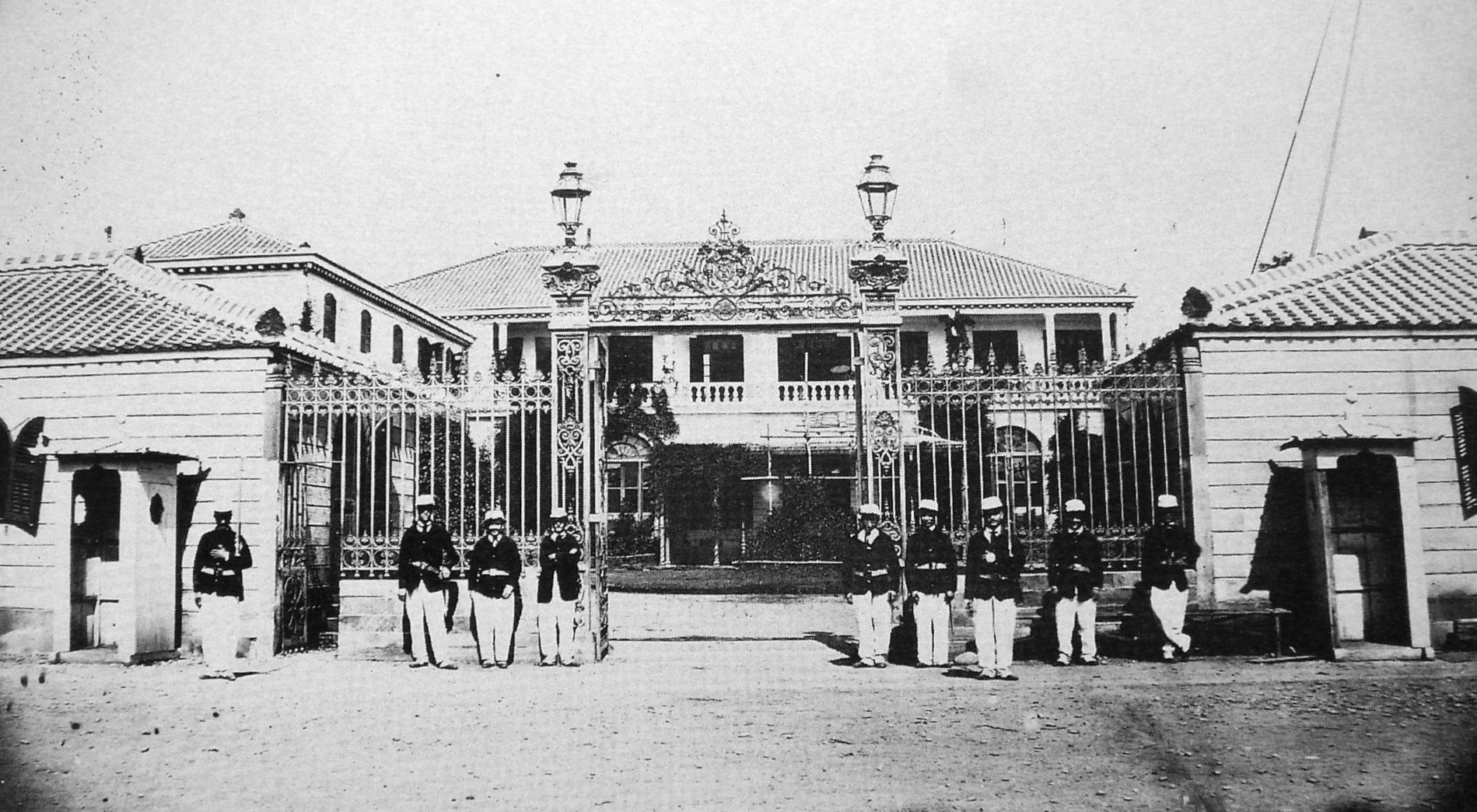
The 1866 French legation in Yokohama.

As the shogunate was confronted with discontent in the southern parts of the country, and foreign shipping was being fired at in violation of treaties, France participated to allied naval interventions such as the Bombardment of Shimonoseki in 1864 (9 British, 3 French, 4 Dutch, 1 American warships).

Following the new tax treaty between Western powers and the shogunate in 1866, Great Britain, France, the United States and the Netherlands took the opportunity to establish a stronger presence in Japan by setting up true embassies in Yokohama. France built a large colonial-style embassy on northern Naka-Dōri street.

=== Military missions and collaboration in the Boshin war ===
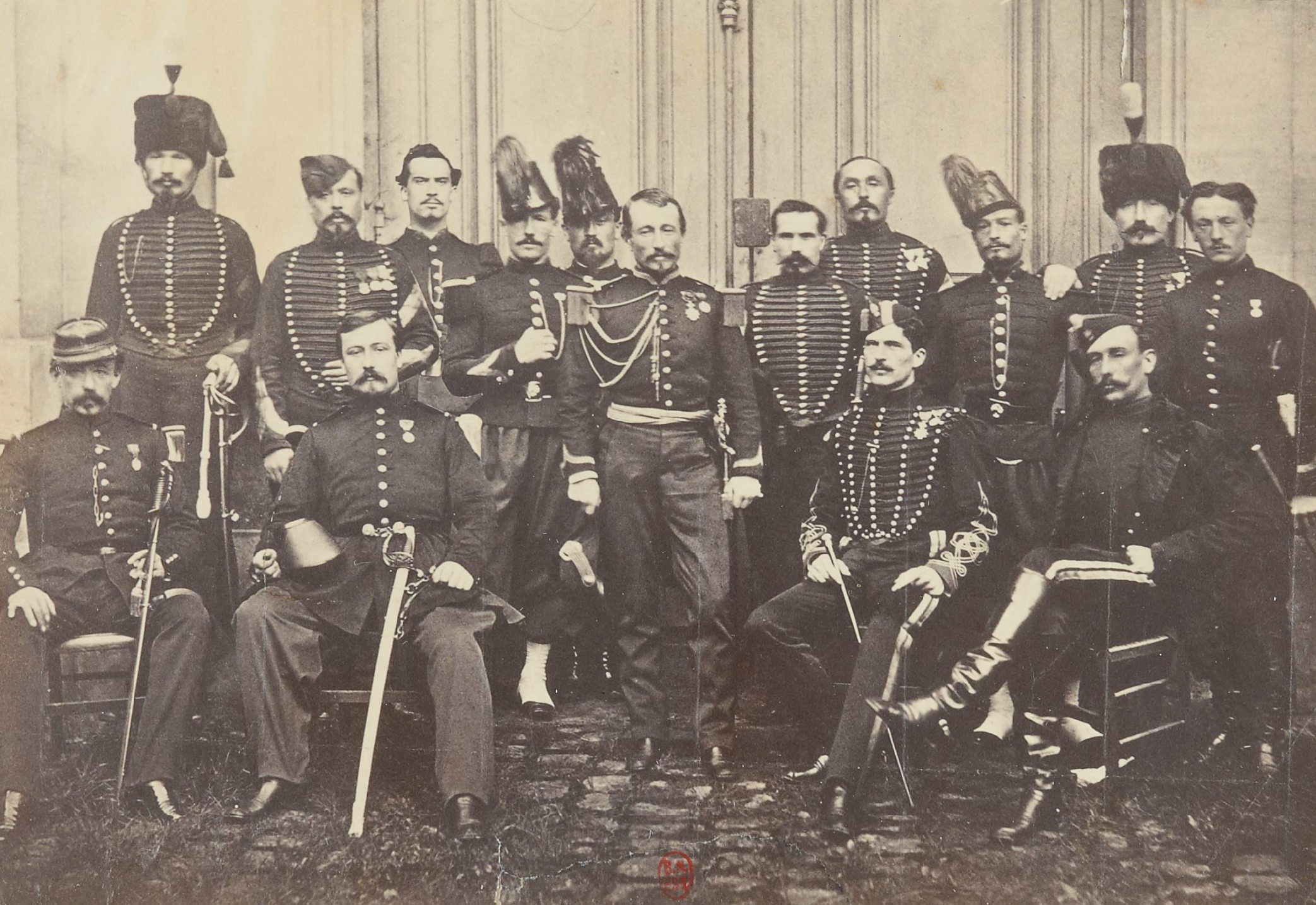
The first French military mission to Japan in 1867. Jules Brunet in front, second from right.

The Japanese Bakufu government, challenged at home by factions which desired the expulsion of foreign powers and the restoration of Imperial rule, also wished to develop military skills as soon as possible. The French military took a central role in the military modernization of Japan.

Negotiations with Napoleon III started through Shibata Takenaka as soon as 1865. In 1867, the first French Military Mission to Japan arrived in Yokohama, among them Captain Jules Brunet. The military mission would engage into a training program to modernize the armies of the shogunate, until the Boshin war broke out a year later leading to a full-scale civil war between the shogunate and the pro-Imperial forces. By the end of 1867, the French mission had trained a total of 10,000 men, voluntaries and recruits, organized into seven infantry regiments, one cavalry battalion, and four artillery battalions. There is a well-known photograph of the shōgun Tokugawa Yoshinobu in French uniform, taken during that period.

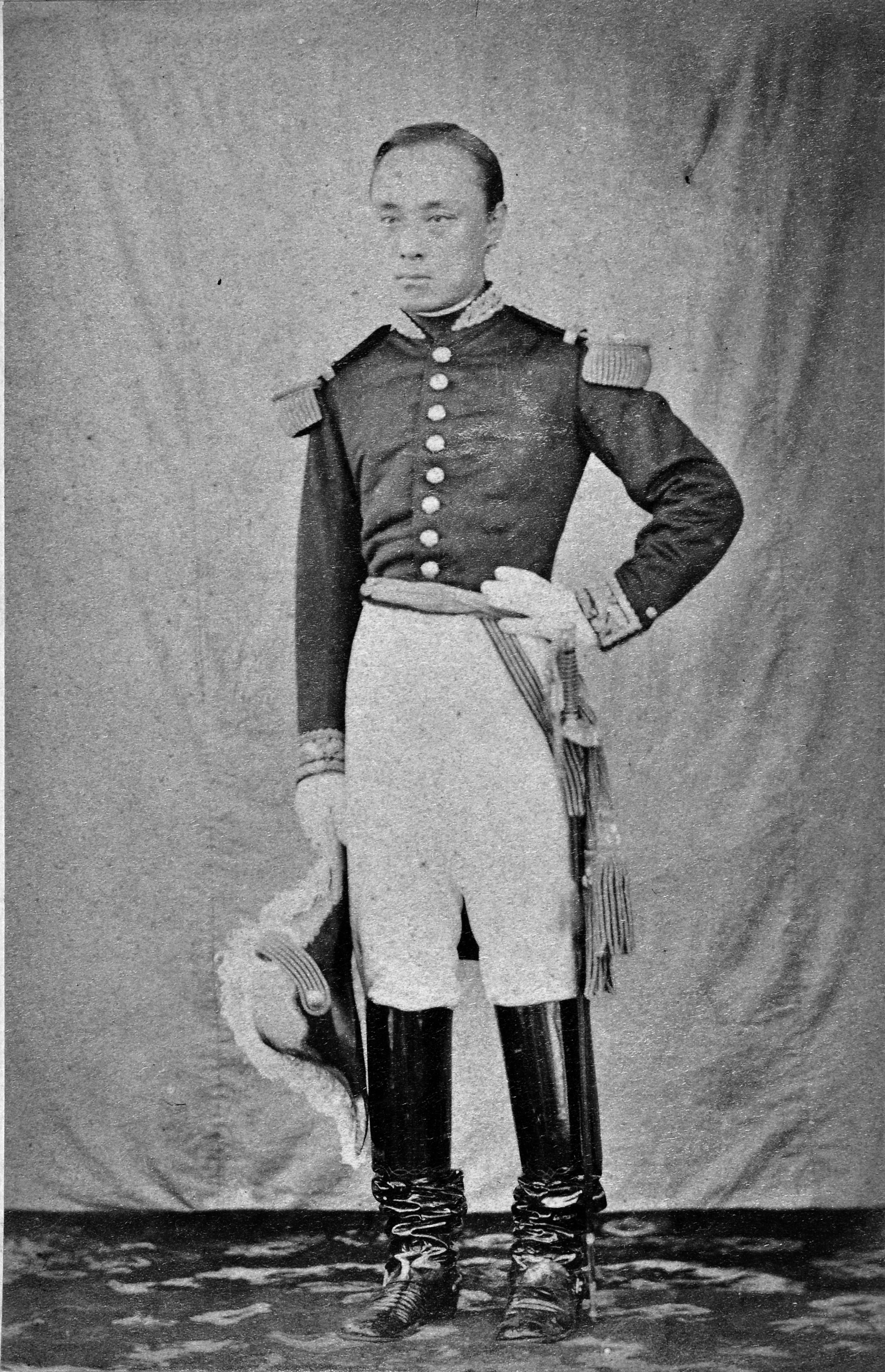
The shōgun Tokugawa Yoshinobu in French military uniform, c. 1867

Foreign powers agreed to take a neutral stance during the Boshin war, but a large portion of the French mission resigned and joined the forces they had trained in their conflict against Imperial forces. French forces would become a target of Imperial forces, leading to the Kobe incident on January 11, 1868, in which a fight erupts in Akashi between 450 samurai of the Okayama fief and French sailors, leading to the occupation of central Kobe by foreign troops. Also in 1868 eleven French sailors from the Dupleix were killed in the Sakai incident, in Sakai, near Osaka, by southern rebel forces.

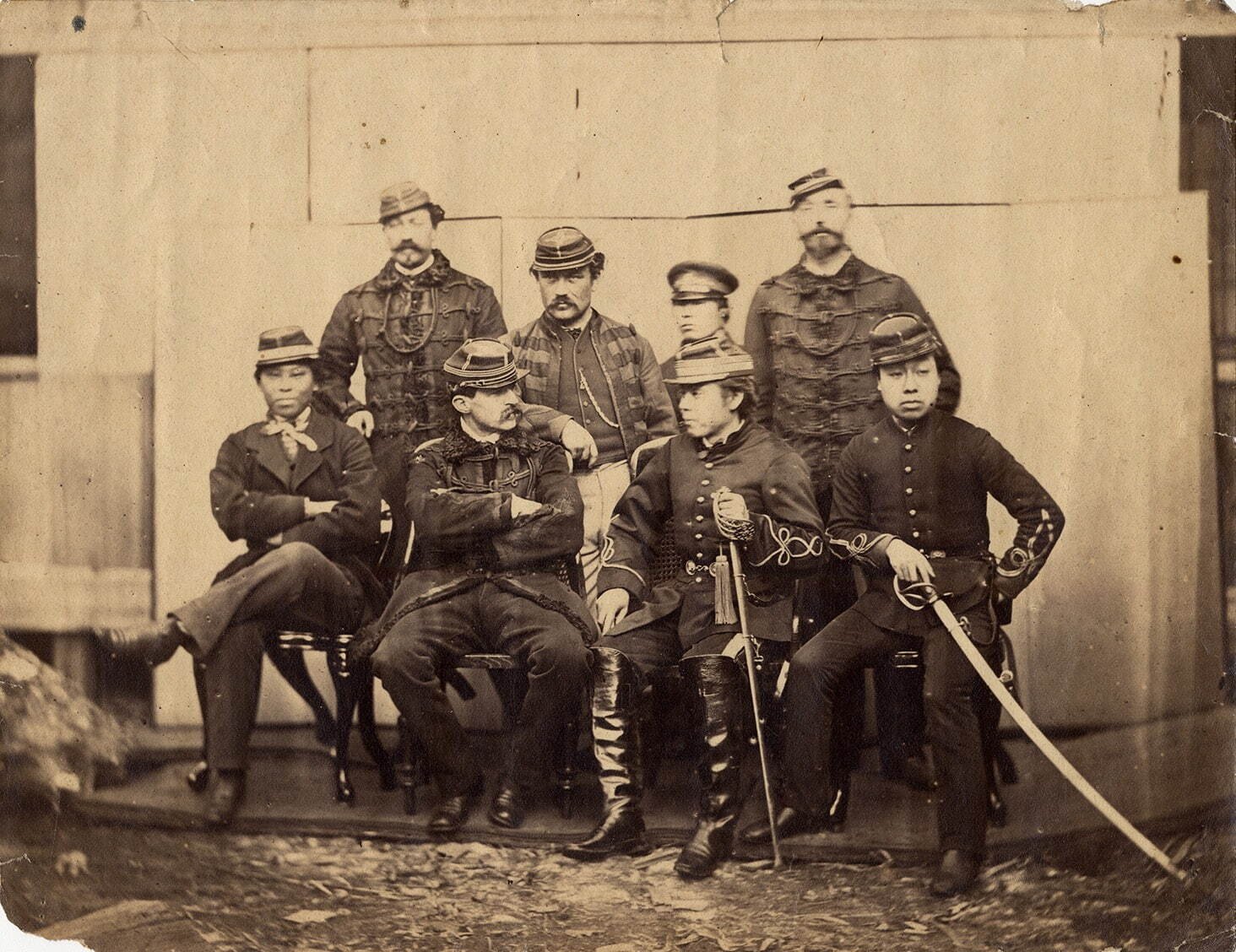
The French military advisers and their Japanese allies in Hokkaido. Back row: Cazeneuve, Marlin, Fukushima Tokinosuke, Fortant. Front row: Hosoya Yasutaro, Jules Brunet, Matsudaira Taro (vice-president of the Ezo Republic), Tajima Kintaro.

Jules Brunet would become a leader of the military effort of the shogunate, reorganizing its defensive efforts and accompanying it to Hokkaido until the ultimate defeat. After the fall of Edo, Jules Brunet fled north with Enomoto Takeaki, the leader of the shogunate's navy, and helped set up the Ezo Republic, with Enomoto Takeaki as the President, Japan's only Republic ever. He also helped organize the defense of Hokkaidō in the Battle of Hakodate. Troops were structured under a hybrid Franco-Japanese leadership, with Otori Keisuke as Commander-in-chief, and Jules Brunet as second in command. Each of the four brigades were commanded by a French officer (Fortant, Marlin, Cazeneuve, Bouffier), with eight Japanese commanders as second in command of each half-brigade.

Other French officers, such as the French Navy officer Eugène Collache, are even known to have fought on the side of the shōgun in samurai attire. These events, involving French officers rather than American ones, were nonetheless an inspiration for the depiction of an American hero in the movie The Last Samurai.

==== Weaponry ====
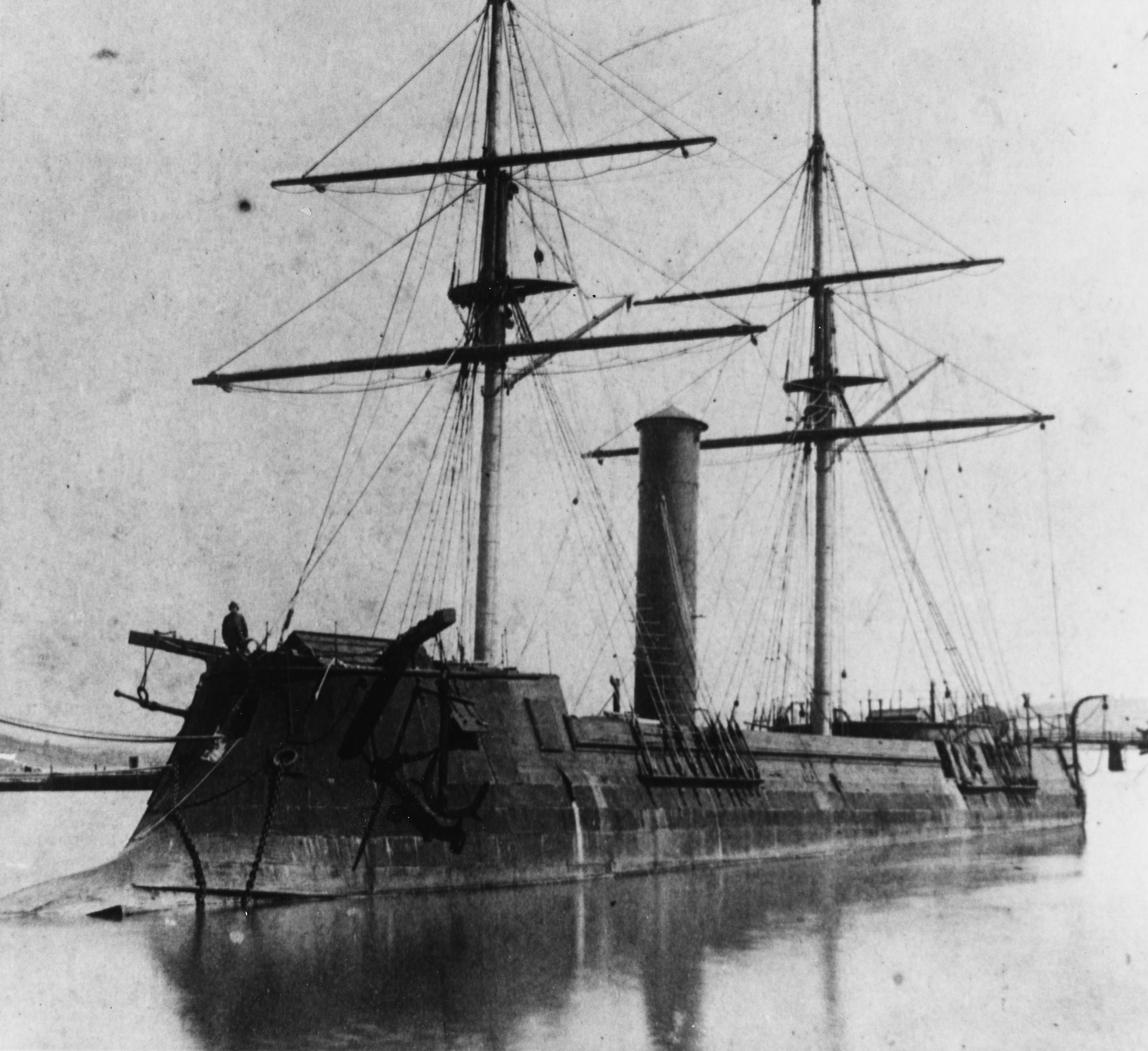
The French-built ironclad warship Kōtetsu, Japan's first ironclad warship.

French weaponry also played a key role in the conflict. Minié rifles were sold in quantities. The French mission brought with them 200 cases of material, including various models of artillery pieces. The French mission also brought 25 thoroughbred Arabian horses, which were given to the shōgun as a present from Napoleon III.

The French-built ironclad warship Kōtetsu, originally purchased by the shogunate to the United States but suspended from delivery when the Boshin war started due to the official neutrality of foreign powers, became the first ironclad warship of the Imperial Japanese Navy when the Emperor Meiji was restored, and had a decisive role in the Naval Battle of Hakodate Bay in May 1869, which marked the end of the Boshin War, and the complete establishment of the Meiji Restoration.

=== Collaboration with Satsuma ===
In 1867, the southern principality of Satsuma, a now-declared enemy of the Bakufu, also invited French technicians, such as the mining engineer François Coignet. Coignet would later become the Director of the Osaka Mining Office.

== Collaboration during the Meiji period (1868–) ==
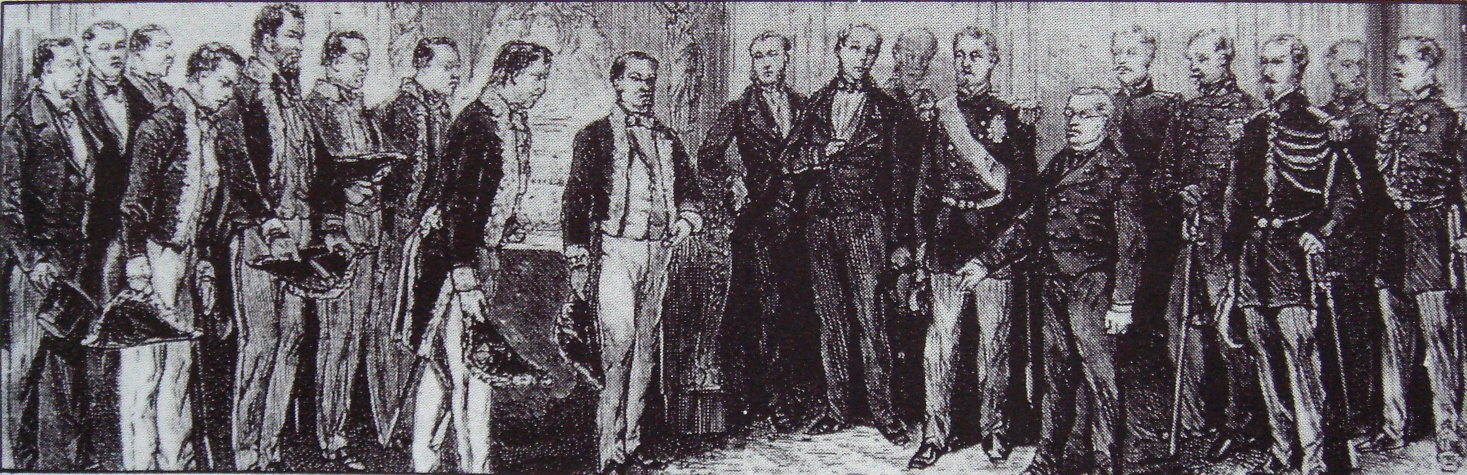
The Iwakura mission visiting the French President Thiers in 1873

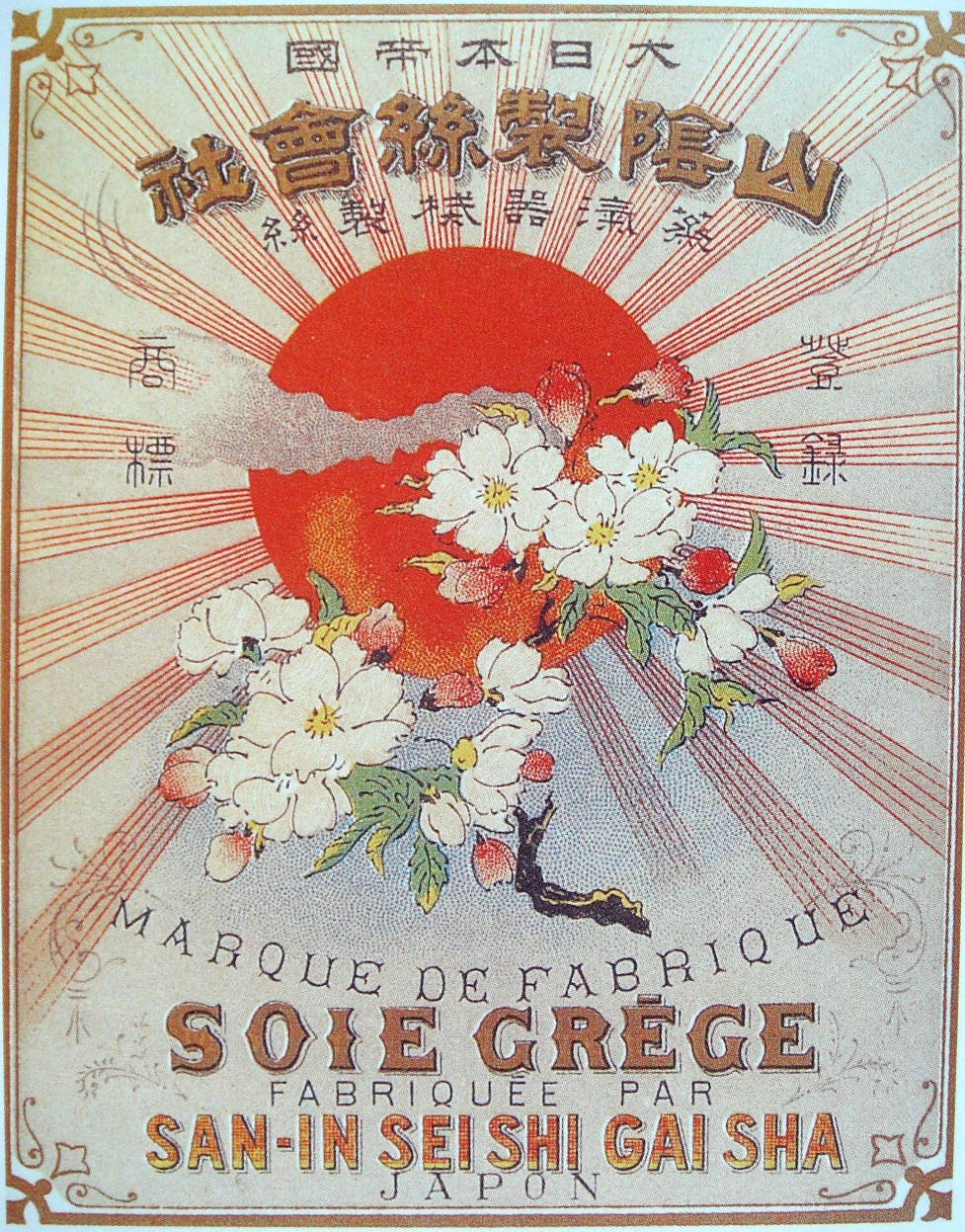
Raw silk pack sticker, in Japanese and French.

Despite its support of the losing side of the conflict during the Boshin War, France continued to play a key role in introducing modern technologies in Japan even after the 1868 Meiji Restoration, encompassing not only the economic or military fields.

French residents such as Ludovic Savatier (who was in Japan from 1867 to 1871, and again from 1873 to 1876 as a Navy doctor based in Yokosuka) were able to witness the considerable acceleration in the modernization of Japan from that time:

"You cannot imagine the transformations Japan has been going through in the last 2 years. This people is moving forward faster than we have during the last 200 years! Within 20 years, there will be more reasons to be proud of being Japanese, than of being European. This is simply unbelievable!"

— Ludovic Savatier, Letters, December 25, 1871.

The Iwakura mission visited France from December 16, 1872, to February 17, 1873, and met with President Thiers. The mission also visited various factories and took great interest in the various systems and technologies being employed. Nakae Chōmin, who was a member of the mission staff and the Ministry of Justice, stayed in France to study the French legal system with the radical republican Émile Acollas. Later he became a journalist, thinker and translator and introduced French thinkers like Jean-Jacques Rousseau to Japan.

=== Trade ===
As trade between the two countries developed, France became the first importer of Japanese silk, absorbing more than 50% of Japan's raw silk production between 1865 and 1885. Silk remained the center of Franco-Japanese economic relations until the First World War. As of 1875, Lyon had become the world center for silk processing, and Yokohama had become the center for the supply of the raw material. Around 1870, Japan produced about 8.000 tons of silk, with Lyon absorbing half of this production, and 13.000 tons in 1910, becoming the first world producer of silk, although the United States had overtaken France as the first importer of Japanese silk from around 1885. Silk exports allowed Japan to gather currencies to purchase foreign goods and technologies.

=== Technologies ===
In 1870, Henri Pelegrin was invited to direct the construction of Japan's first gas-lightning system in the streets of Nihonbashi, Ginza and Yokohama. In 1872, Paul Brunat opened the first modern Japanese silk spinning factory at Tomioka. Three craftsmen from the Nishijin weaving district in Kyoto, Sakura tsuneshichi, Inoue Ihee and Yoshida Chushichi traveled to Lyon. They traveled back to Japan in 1873, importing a Jacquard loom. Tomioka became Japan's first large-scale silk-reeling factory, and an example for the industrialization of the country.

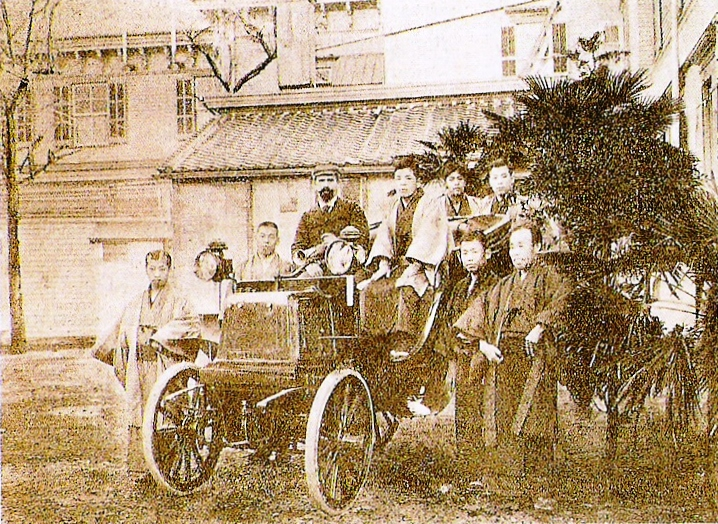
The first automobile to be introduced in Japan, a French Panhard-Levassor, in 1898

France was also highly regarded for the quality of its Legal system, and was used as an example to establish the country's legal code. Georges Bousquet taught law from 1871 to 1876. The legal expert Gustave Émile Boissonade was sent to Japan in 1873 to help build a modern legal system, and helped the country through 22 years.

Japan again participated to the 1878 World Fair in Paris. Every time France was deemed to have a specific expertise, its technologies were introduced. In 1882, the first tramways were introduced from France and started to function at Asakusa, and between Shinbashi and Ueno. In 1898, the first automobile was introduced in Japan, a French Panhard-Levassor.

=== Military collaboration ===
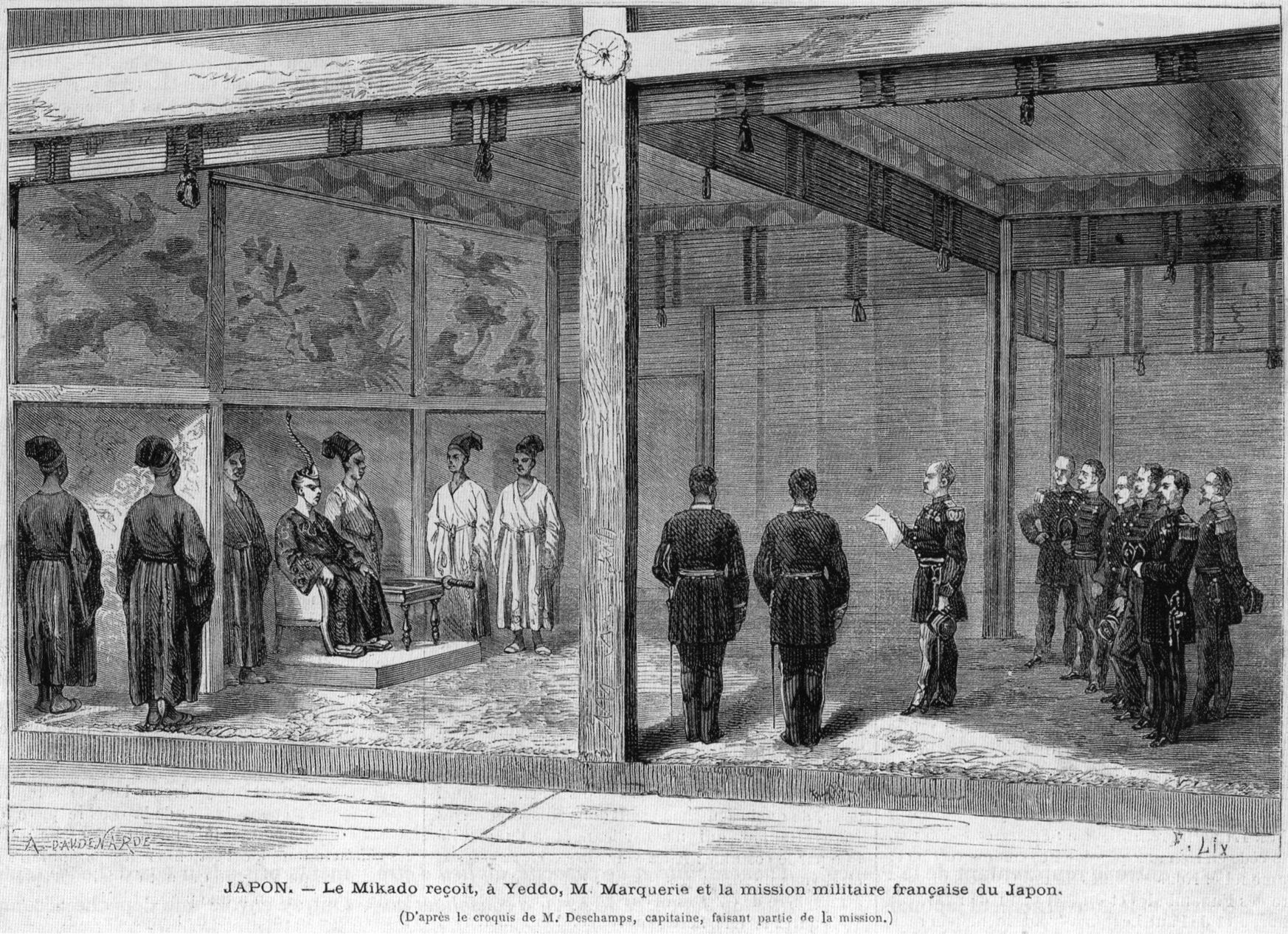
Reception by the Meiji Emperor of the Second French Military Mission to Japan, 1872.

Despite the French defeat during the Franco-Prussian War (1870–1871), France was still considered as an example in the military field as well, and was used as a model for the development of the Imperial Japanese Army. As soon as 1872, a second French military mission to Japan (1872–1880) was invited, with the objective of organizing the army and establishing a military educational system. The mission established the Ichigaya Military Academy (市ヶ谷陸軍士官校), built in 1874, on the ground of today's Ministry of Defense. In 1877, the modernized Imperial Japanese Army would defeat the Satsuma rebellion led by Saigō Takamori.

A third French military mission to Japan (1884–89) composed of five men started in 1884, but this time the Japanese also involved some German officers for the training of the General Staff from 1886 to 1889 (the Meckel Mission), although the training of the rest of the Officers remained to the French mission. After 1894, Japan did not employ any foreign military instructor, until 1918 when the country welcomed the fourth French military mission to Japan (1918–19), with the objective of acquiring technologies and techniques in the burgeoning area of military aviation.

=== Formation of the Imperial Japanese Navy ===
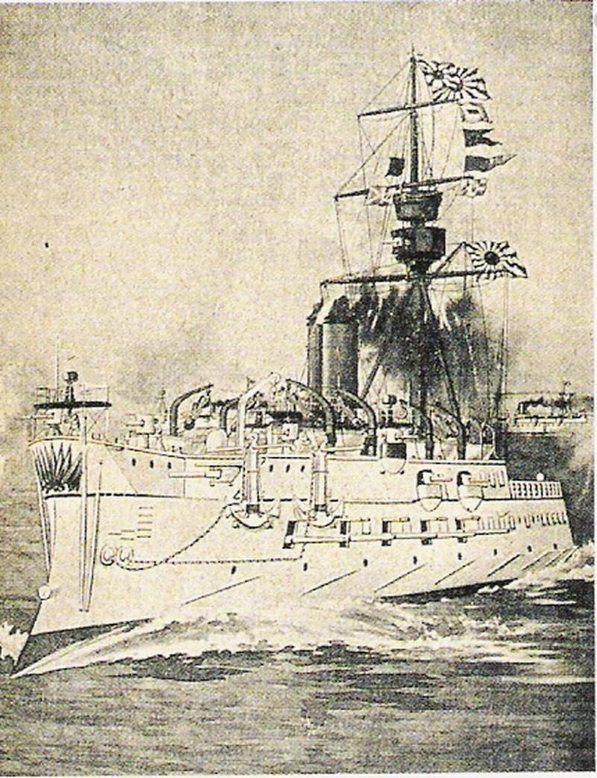
The Bertin-designed French-built Matsushima, flagship of the Japanese Navy up to the Sino-Japanese conflict

The French Navy leading engineer Émile Bertin was invited to Japan for four years (from 1886 to 1890) to reinforce the Imperial Japanese Navy, and direct the construction of the arsenals of Kure and Sasebo. For the first time, with French assistance, the Japanese were able to build a full fleet, some of it built in Japan, some of it in France and a few other European nations. The three cruisers designed by Emile Bertin (Matsushima, Itsukushima, and Hashidate) were equipped with 12.6in (32 cm) Canet guns, an extremely powerful weapon for the time. These efforts contributed to the Japanese victory in the First Sino-Japanese War.

This period also allowed Japan "to embrace the revolutionary new technologies embodied in torpedoes, torpedo-boats and mines, of which the French at the time were probably the world's best exponents".

== Japanese influences on France ==
=== Silk technology ===
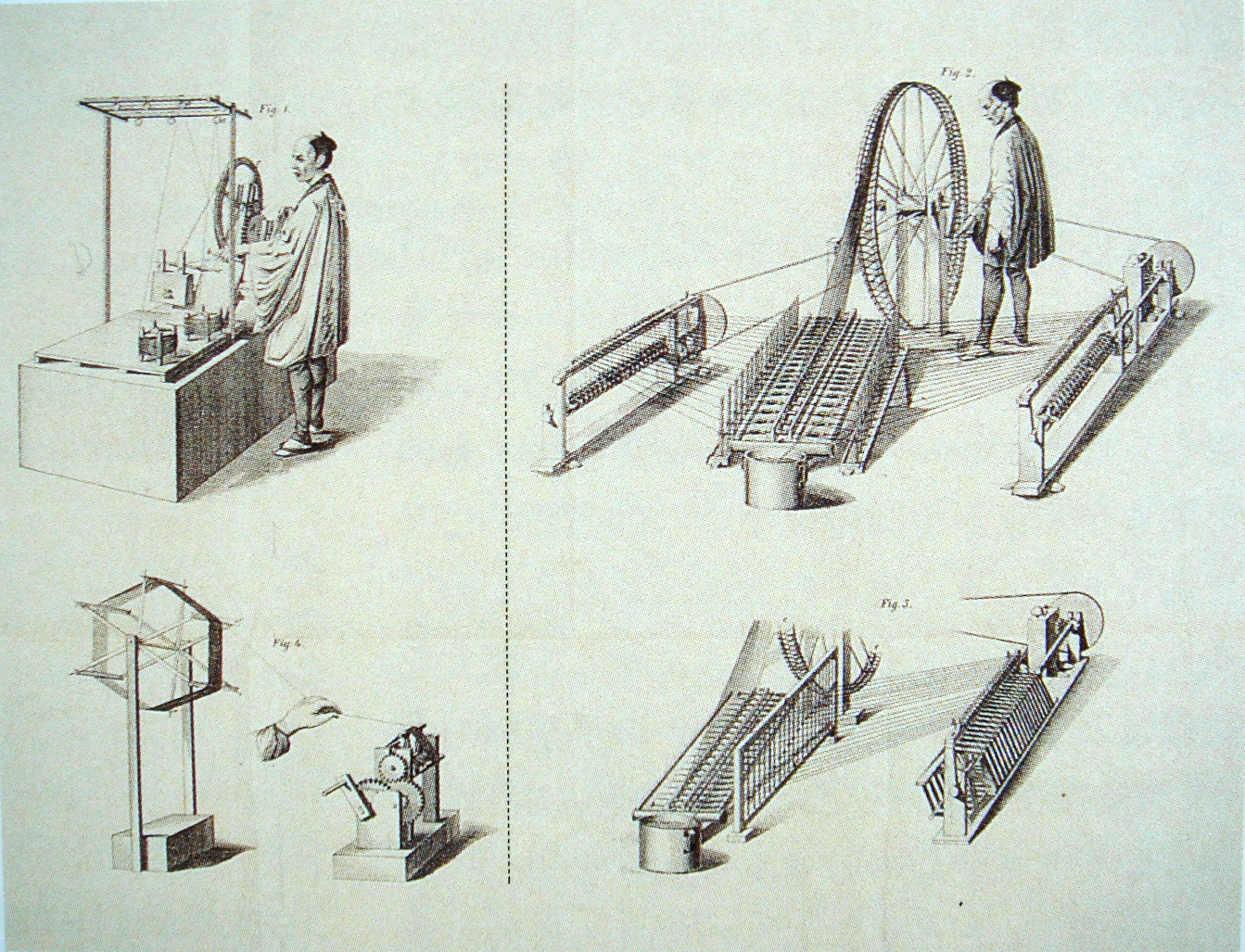
Silk technologies in Japan. In La sericulture, le commerce des soies et des graines et l'industrie de la soie au Japon, Ernest de Bavier, 1874

In a rather rare case of "reverse Rangaku" (that is, the science of isolationist Japan making its way to the West), an 1803 treatise on the raising of silk worms and manufacture of silk, the Secret Notes on Sericulture (養蚕秘録, Yōsan Hiroku) was brought to Europe by von Siebold and translated into French and Italian in 1848, contributing to the development of the silk industry in Europe.

In 1868, Léon de Rosny published a translation of a Japanese work on silk worms: Traité de l'éducation des vers a soie au Japon. In 1874, Ernest de Bavier published a detailed study of the silk industry in Japan (La sericulture, le commerce des soies et des graines et l'industrie de la soie au Japon, 1874).

=== Arts ===
Japanese art decisively influenced the art of France, and the art of the West in general during the 19th century. From the 1860s, ukiyo-e, a genre of Japanese wood-block prints and paintings, became a source of inspiration for many European impressionist painters in France and the rest of the West, and eventually for Art Nouveau and Cubism. Artists were especially affected by the lack of perspective and shadow, the flat areas of strong colour, the compositional freedom in placing the subject off-centre, with mostly low diagonal axes to the background.

"Just looking at painting, undeniable signs of this influence can be seen in the school of the Impressionists. Some of the main actors of this school, such as Degas and Monet, owe a lot, as they themselves recognize, to the teachings of Japanese art, especially the remarkable prints of Hokusai and Hiroshige."

— Louis Gonse, L'Art Japonais et son influence sur le goût européen

=== Culture and literature ===
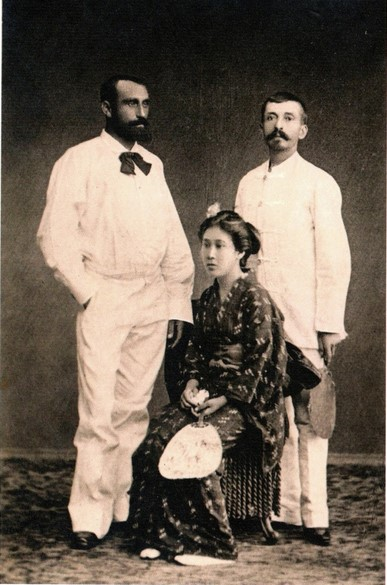
Pierre Loti (right) with "Chrysantheme" and friend Yves, Japan, 1885

As Japan opened to Western influence, numerous Western travellers visited the country, taking a great interest in the arts and culture. The French writer Pierre Loti wrote one of his most famous novels Madame Chrysanthème (1887) based on his encounter with a young Japanese woman during a month, – a precursor to Madame Butterfly and Miss Saigon and a work that is a combination of narrative and travelog. Another famous Frenchman who visited Japan was Émile Étienne Guimet, who wrote extensively on Asian cultures and Japan in particular, and would create the Guimet Museum upon his return.

== See also ==
- France–Japan relations
