= Moges =

Moges (Amharic: ሞገስ) is a male given name of Ethiopian origin that may refer to:

- Moges Kebede, Ethiopian writer and publisher
- Moges Taye (born 1973), Ethiopian marathon runner
- Moges Tadesse (born 1993), Ethiopian international footballer

The meaning of the word Moges is favor (as in Divine favor from God).

== See also ==
- Alfred de Moges (1830–1861), French diplomat
- Kaghnut, a rural community in Armenia formerly known as Moges
