= Charles de Chassiron =

French diplomat (1818–1871)

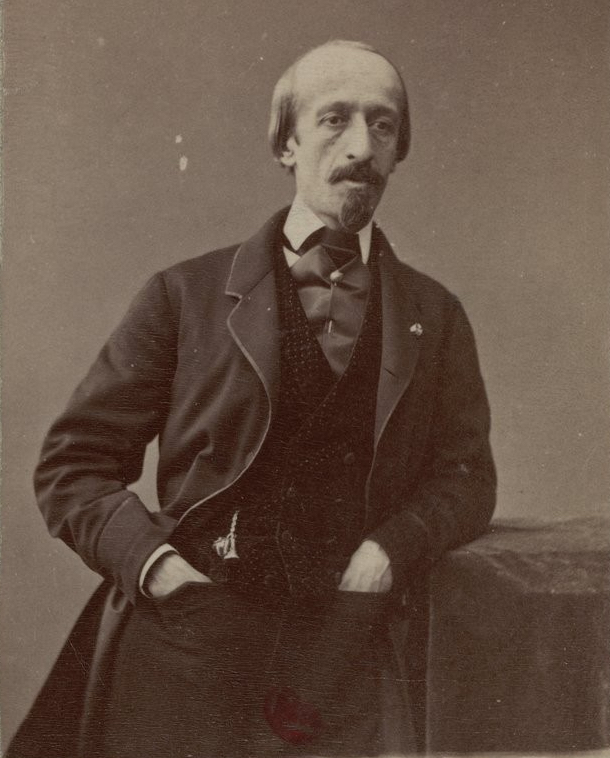
Charles de Chassiron, by Nadar.

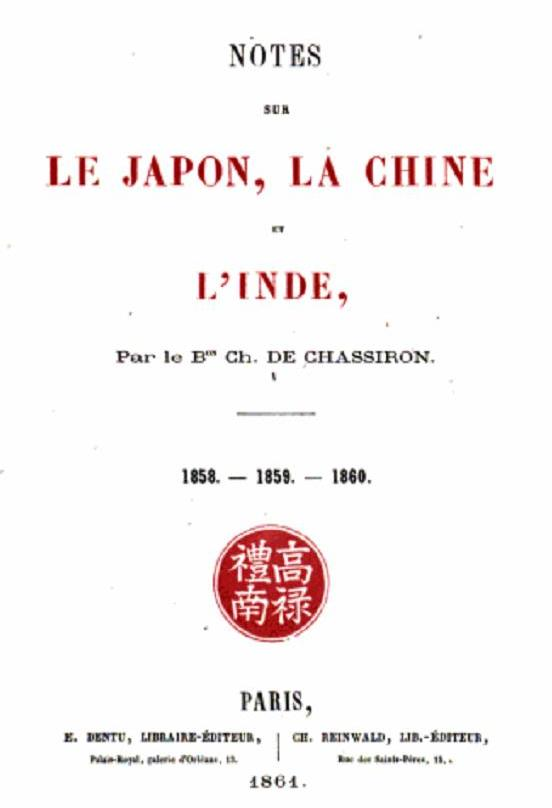
Notes sur le Japon la Chine et l'Inde: 1858-1859-1860, by Charles de Chassiron, 1861.

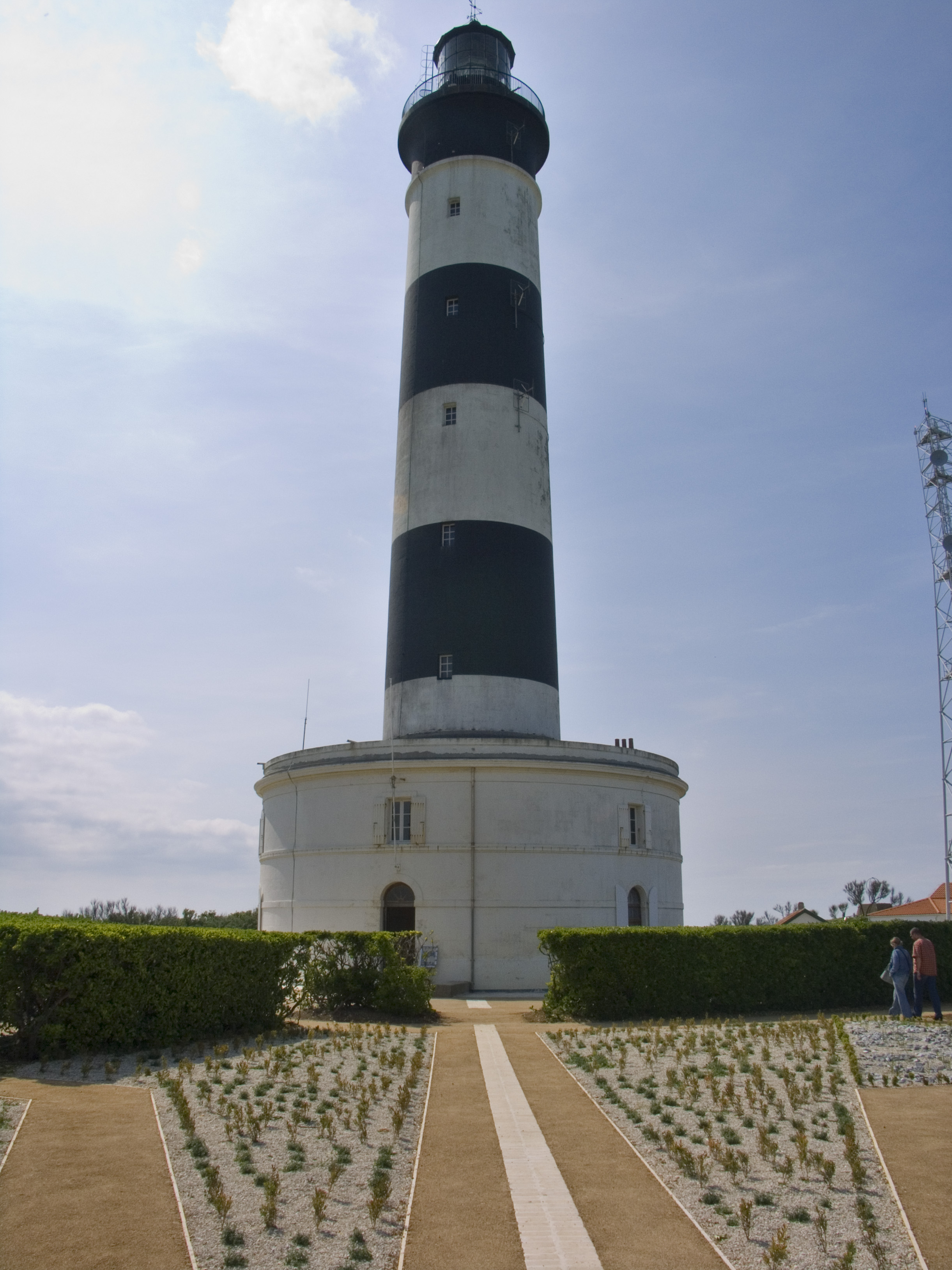
The Chassiron lighthouse in Ile d'Oléron.

Baron Charles Gustave Martin de Chassiron (1818–1871) was a French diplomat of the 19th century. He travelled to China and Japan as one of the two Attachés of the French Embassy under Baron Gros, with the title of "Detaché extraordinaire en Chine et au Japon" from 1858 to 1860, together with Marquis Alfred de Moges.

Chassiron wrote an account of his travels Notes sur le Japon, la Chine et l'Inde: 1858-1859-1860.

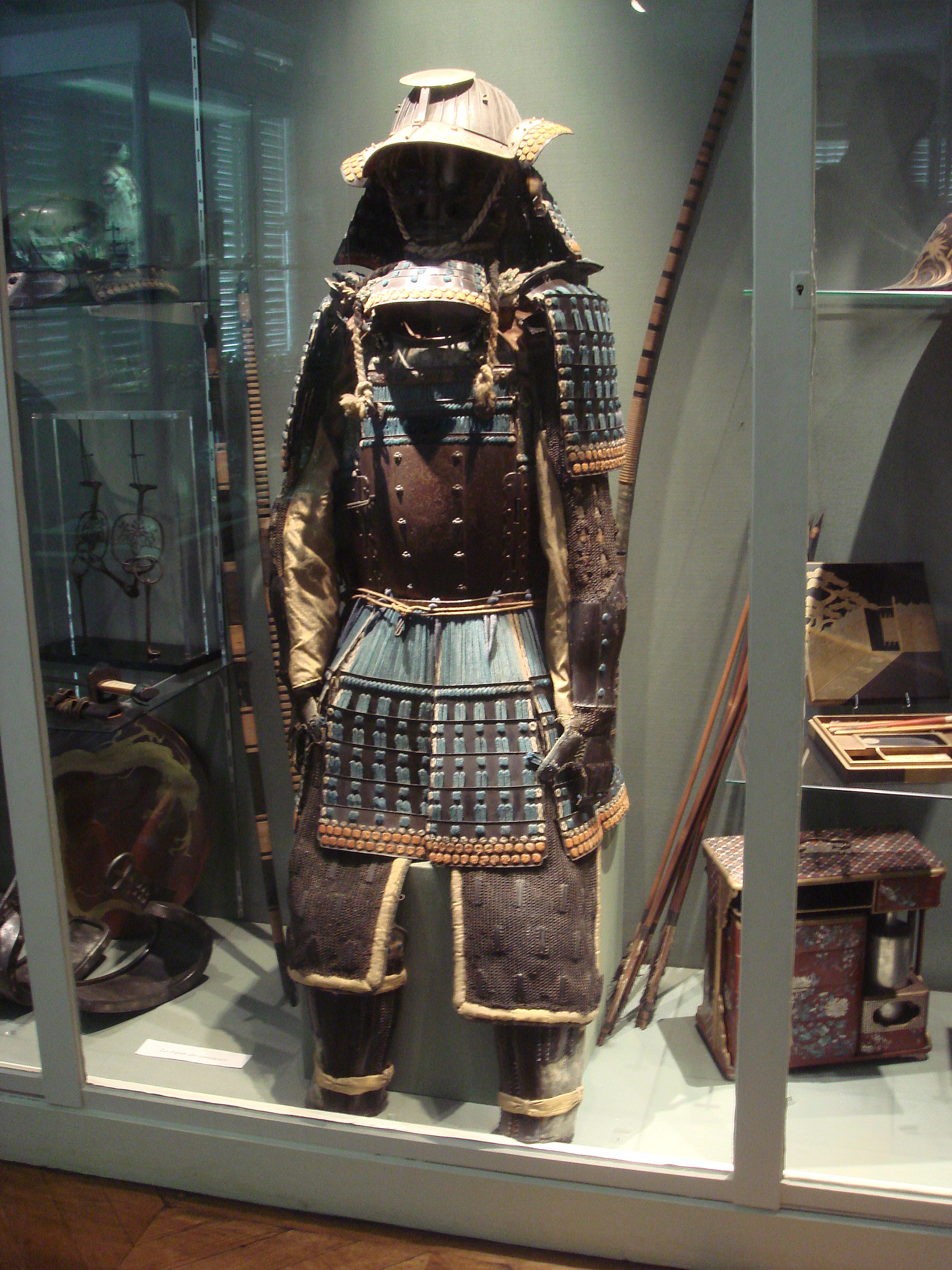
Japanese artifacts of the Chassiron collection at the Orbigny-Bernon Museum, La Rochelle.

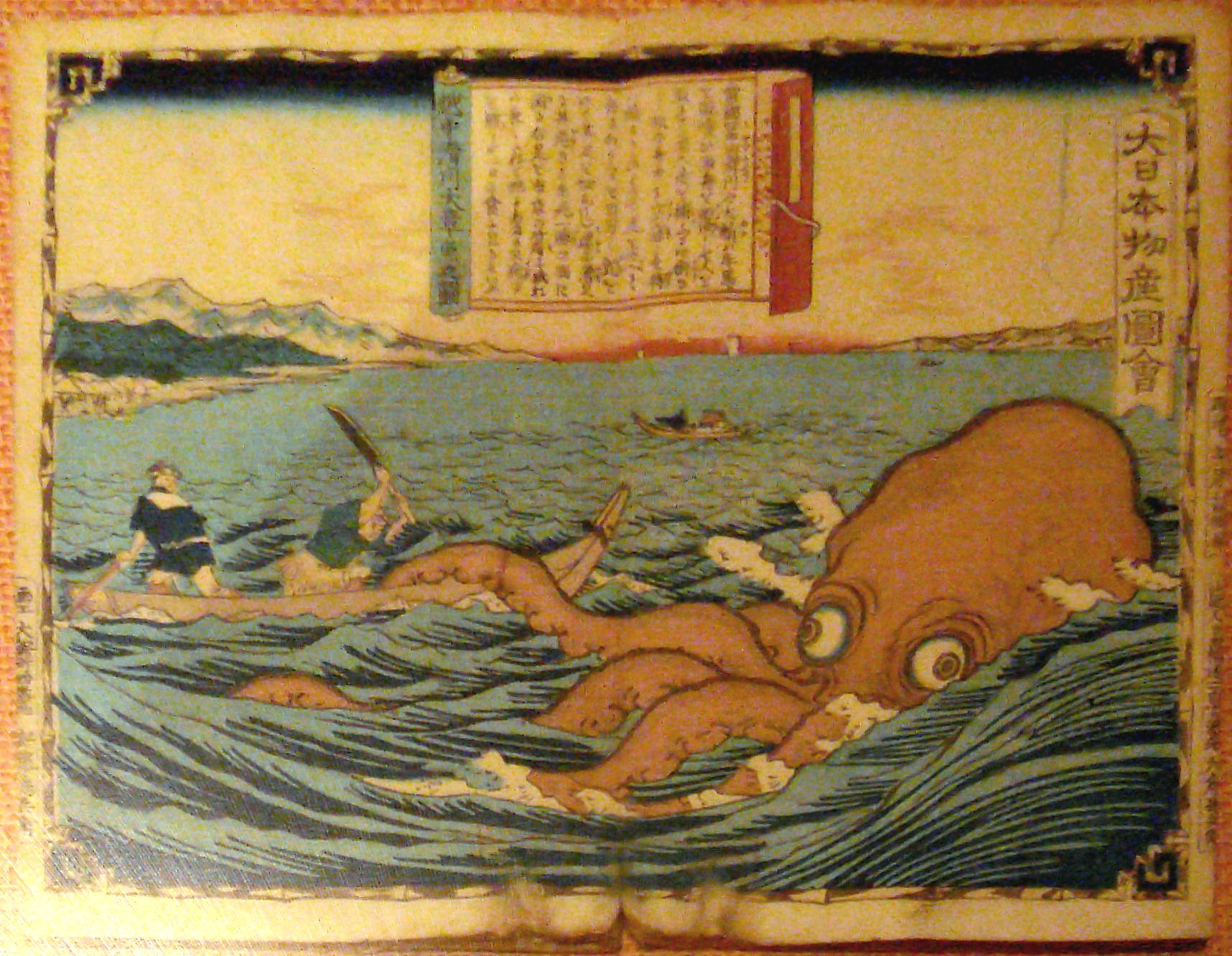
Japanese print of the Chassiron collection.

During his travels, Chassiron built a large collection of Japanese and Chinese artifacts which are displayed today at the Orbigny-Bernon Museum in La Rochelle.

The Chassiron lighthouse (Phare de Chassiron) at the northern tip of Ile d'Oléron was named after him.

He was the first husband of Princess Caroline Laetitia Murat (firstborn of Prince Napoleon Lucien Charles Murat, son of Caroline Bonaparte): they got married in Paris, 6 June 1850. They had a son, Guy de Chassiron (1863–1932). After his death his widow remarried that same year with a wealthy Englishman, John Lewis Garden, and had two daughters from him.

He was the father of famous dancer Emma Livry

== See also ==
- France–Japan relations (19th century)

== Works ==
- Aperçu Pittoresque de la Régence de Tunis
- Notes sur le Japon, la Chine et l'Inde 1858-1859-1860
