= Orbigny-Bernon Museum =

Coordinates: 46°09′39″N 1°09′19″W

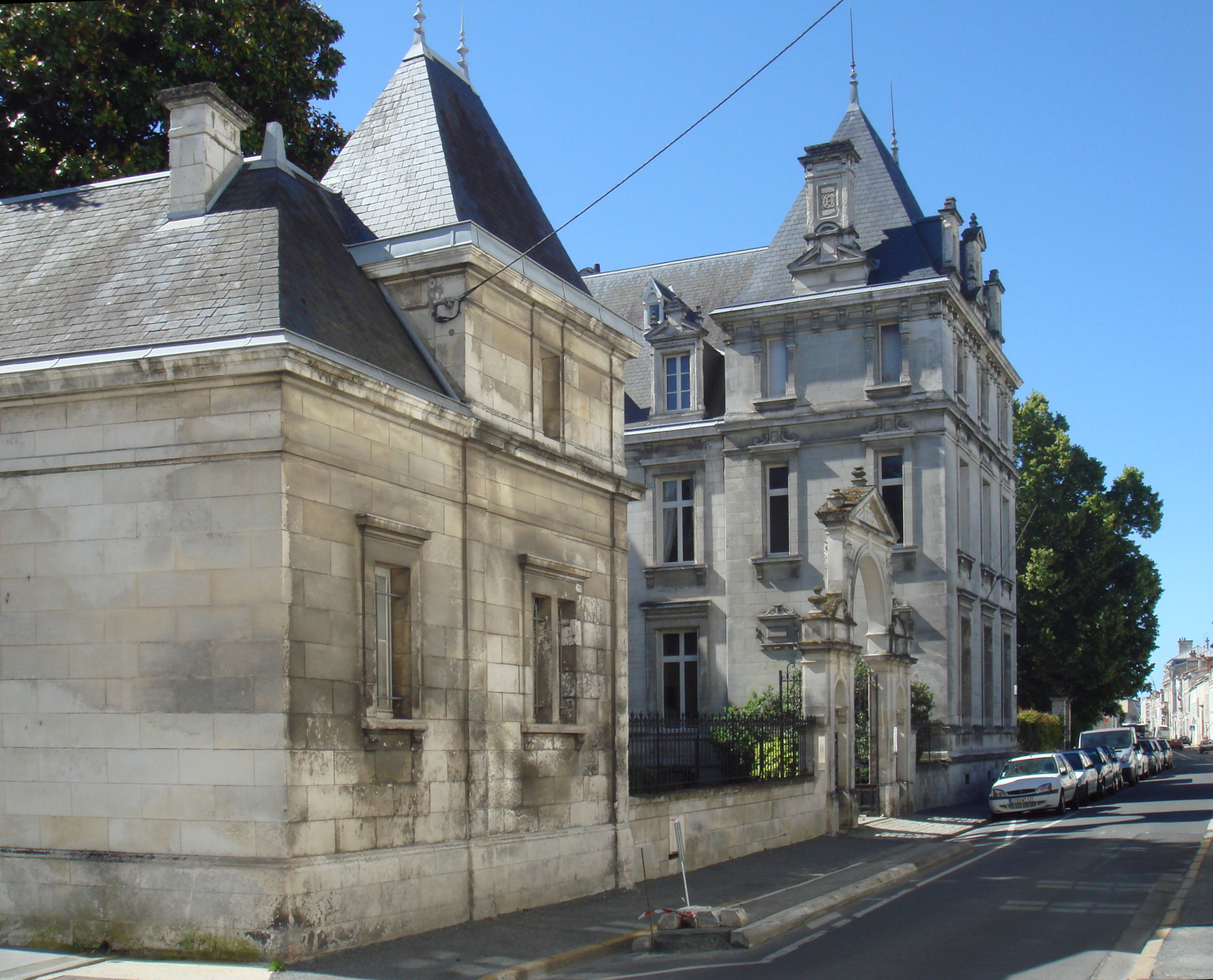
The Orbigny-Bernon Museum in La Rochelle.

The Orbigny-Bernon Museum (French: Musée d'Orbigny-Bernon, [myze dɔʁbiɲi bɛʁnɔ̃]) is a history museum in the French city of La Rochelle.

It was founded in 1917, and contains collections relating to the history of La Rochelle, as well as an important collection of porcelains of the city. A floor is also dedicated to Far Eastern art, with the collection of the French diplomat Baron Charles de Chassiron.

Closed since September 2012, it will be converted to accommodate the city's cultural services. The collections were transferred to the Museum of Fine Arts in La Rochelle.

== Collections ==
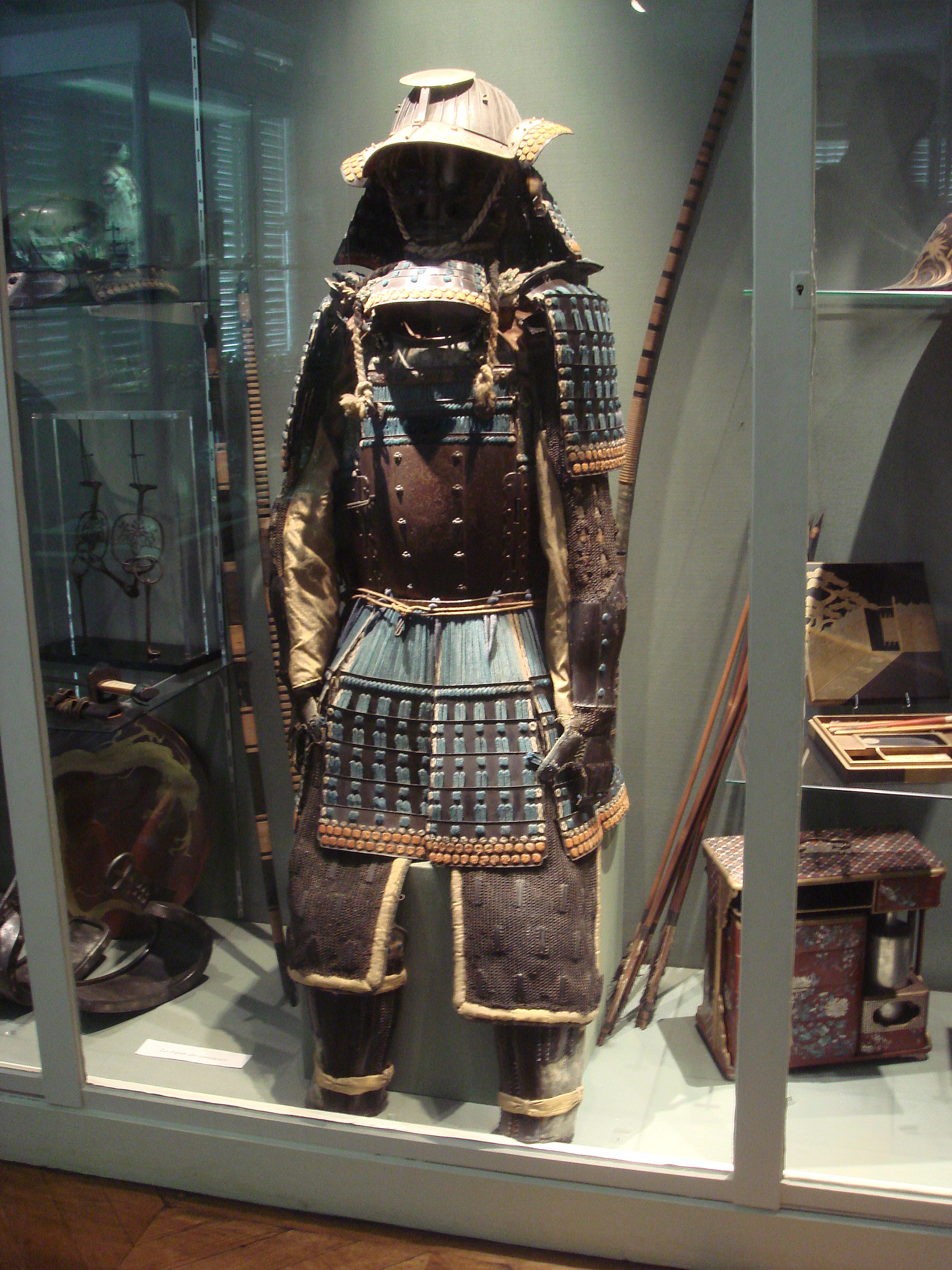
Japanese artifacts of the Chassiron collection.

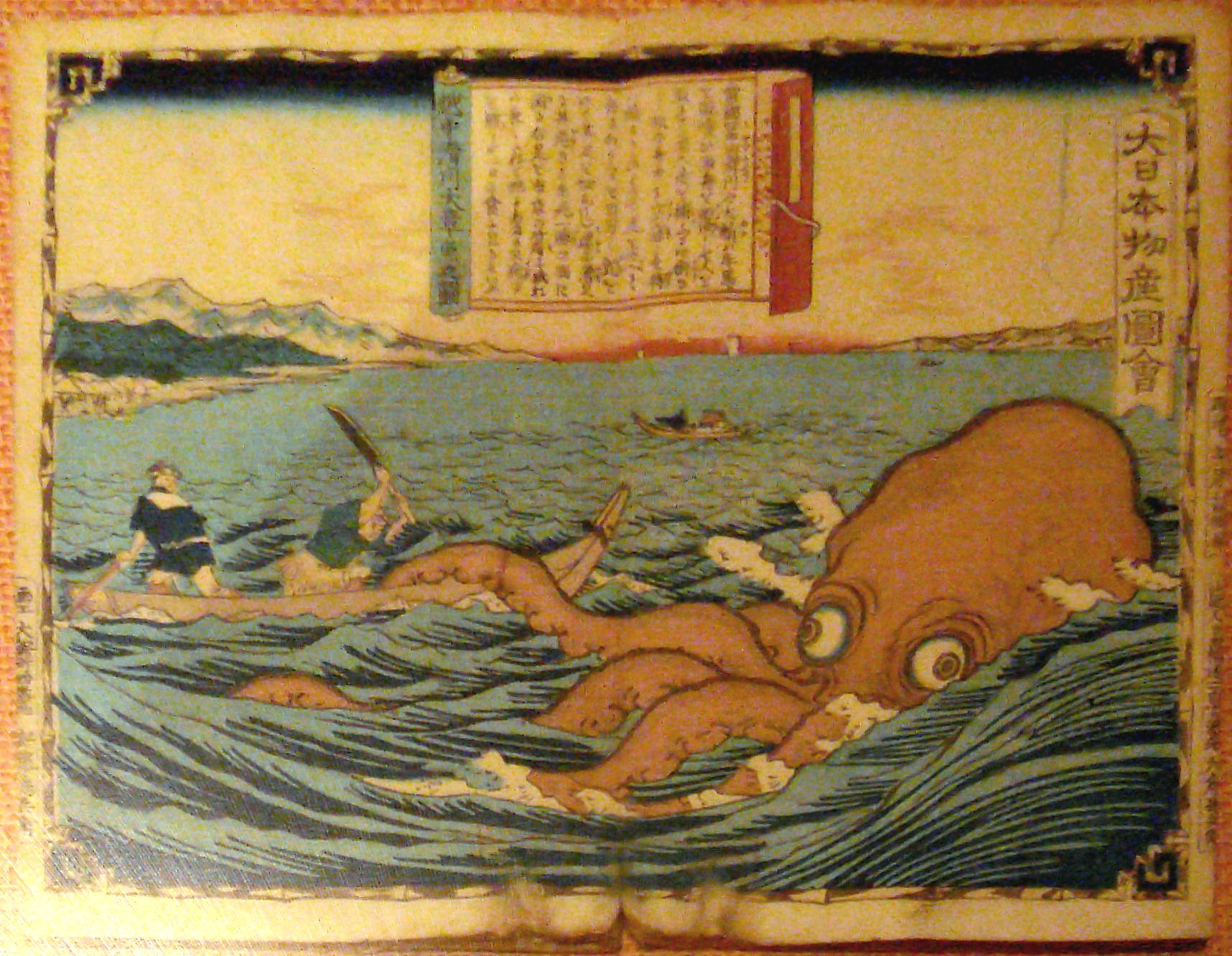
Japanese print of the Chassiron collection.

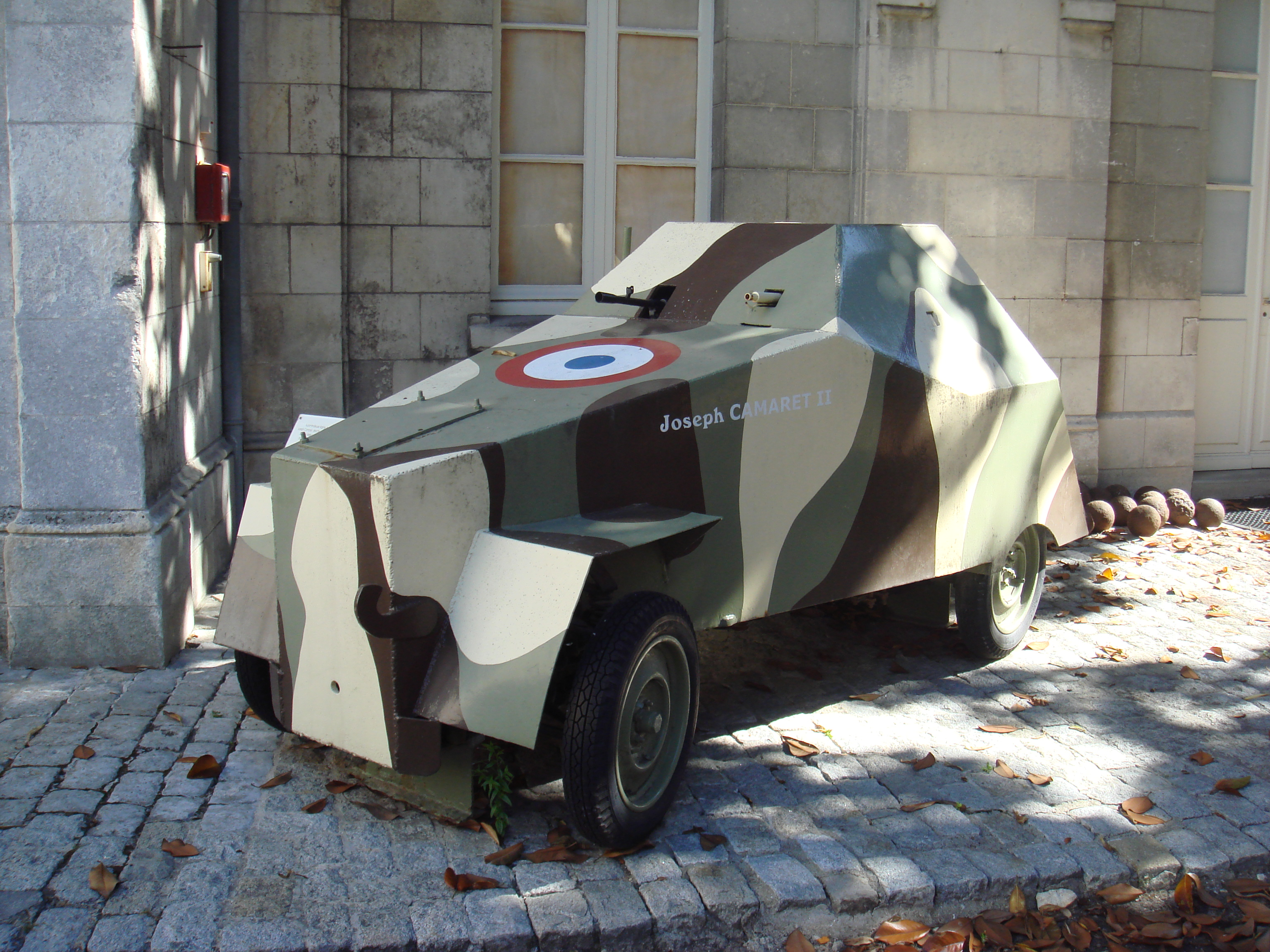
Free French armoured car which participated in the Allied siege of La Rochelle in 1945.
