= Alfred de Moges =

French diplomat

Alfred, Marquis de Moges (1830–1861 in Menton, Alpes-Maritimes) was a French diplomat of the 19th century. In 1858 he accompanied Charles de Chassiron and Jean-Baptiste Louis Gros to sign the Treaty of Amity and Commerce between France and Japan in Edo on 9 October 1858.

== Works ==
- Souvenirs d'une ambassade en Chine et au Japon en 1857 et 1858. Paris: Librairie de L. Hachette et Cie. 1860.
  - Recollections of Baron Gros's Embassy to China and Japan in 1857-58. London: Richard Griffin and Company. 1860.
