= Order of Musashi Shinobi Samurai =

Japanese shinobi clan

The Order of Musashi Shinobi Samurai is a Japanese shinobisamurai clan which served Tokugawa Ieyasu and the Tokugawa Shogunate. They served the Tokugawa Shogunate as intelligence operatives called onmitsu (undercover agents), and metsuke (inspectors), and in the 19th century, as diplomats. When the political system changed due to the restoration of the monarchy in 1868, it became independent. The order consists of a number of families and people who have built close relations of trust with the Shibata Clan of the Musashi Province.

The clan was closed for over 450 years and kept its arts hidden, but turned to open its door to the public in 2006. It has become an NPO and now engaged in introducing the ninja and samurai cultures of the Clan Shibata, as well as in the advocacy of its philosophy, now termed Ninshido which was developed by their ancestors under the shogunate.

== The Definition of "Shinobi samurai" ==
According to the First Chapter of Mansenshukai (Bansenshukai) authored by Fujibayashi Sabuji Yasutake in 1676, there were two types of shinobi, namely shinobisamurai and shinobinomono. The shinobisamurai were samurai who trained their servants, peasants and the locals to work as shinobinomono and contracted for shinobi services from feudal lords. The shinobinomono didn't have warrior backgrounds. The two Japanese characters used by the author for the term "shinobisamurai" (忍士) can be also read "ninshi".

In the order, the term "shinobisamurai" refers to the samurai who used to engage in shinobi activities during the Warring State Period. And after 1600, those who served the Shogunate are referred to as "ninshi".

== The Shinobijutsu (ninjutsu) of the Order ==
The case for the Musashi Shinobijutsu was made at the congress of the International Association of Ninja Research, 2020. The traditional understanding of shinobijutsu (ninjutsu) in the order is that it is not a martial art but a collection of strategic techniques to collect intelligence without being noticed. The shinobi arts handed down in the order are: the clan martial arts, weapon crafting, performing arts, equestrian arts, shinobi medicine, explosives and language education. Thus each member chooses his/her art(s) to focus on. As shinobi's missions are to gather information that shinobi do not need to be martial artists. There are variety of shinobi classes, namely, bugei(martial arts)-shinobi, gigei(performing arts)-shinobi, tokumu(special duty)-shinobi, etc. depending on the expertise of the shinobi.

== The Ideology of the Order ==
The Ideoaly of the Order was explained at International Ninja Research Association 2019.

The clan follows an ideology known as "'Ninshido" (忍士道), the Way of Shinobi Samurai. It promotes the concept of 'Kyohmei Mizukagami' (共鳴水鏡), aiming for the state of Ku, or no-self, through training. When a Shinobi achieves inner peace, they harmonize with nature. The inner peace is called "Washin'" (和心).

Understanding that everyone vibrates with energy, our training purpose is to attune ourselves to others' vibrations. We strive to act like water mirrors, reflecting others with compassion and aiming for mutual prosperity through this resonance.

The ninpo of the Order is called "Gorin Ninpo" (五輪忍法). Ninpo is a fundamental philosophy to indicate how shinobijutsu should be applied. The teamwork guideline is expressed by four characters: "Lin fuh lai in" (林風雷陰(隠) signifying "Act quietly and fast, get results instantly without being noticed."

The Ninshido provides guidelines, systems, and methods to help each Shinobi member gradually transition their expertise from mere jutsu (techniques) to a path based on Do (Way).

== History ==
The order has a shinobi samurai origin. The history of the order goes back to the mid-16th century.

On 4 June 1582, right after Honnō-ji Incident (本能寺の変), Nagamochi Tokuzo and his kins, escorted Tokugawa Ieyasu by the request from Ieyasu's retainer, Hattori Hanzo. Together with other Iga and Koka shinobi, they guarded Ieyasu to Ise where Ieyasu and his retainers boarded a ship and eventually arrived at the Okazaki Castle in Mie successfully. Since then the Igamono shinobi samurai started to serve Ieyasu, and the clan officially became retainers of Tokugawa Ieyasu in 1582. They moved to Edo (in Musashi region) in 1590 with Tokugawa Ieyasu and thereafter served the Tokugawa Shogunate till 1868.

During the Bakumatsu period, the two families reestablished themselves as a new clan in Musashi Region. After the Meiji Restoration of 1868, declining the offer from the Meiji Government, it became a private organization to maintain its shinobi samurai traditions.

=== 1582-1833: "Era of Edo Onmitsu Ninshi" ===
The definition of the Edo Ninshi

The ninshi are the samurai metsuke (inspectors) and samurai onmitsu (undercover agents) who engaged in covert operations for the Edo Tokugawa Shogunate, and those who became key to intelligence activities in Europe as envoys.

In 1582 Shibata Suwo and Nagamochi Tokuzo became retainers of Tokugawa Ieyasu.

In 1584 Nagamochi Tokuzo died in the Battle of Matsugashima Castle. Went to the Castle with Hattori Hanzo and other Igamonos to assist the Oda force, ally of the Tokugawas.

From 1590 the clan heads (Shibata Suwo and Nagamochi Judaiyu) in Edo served in the Edo Castle, as Hiroshikiban to guard the shogun's private quarters in addition to working as onmitsu (undercover agents).

In 1615 Shibata Suwo died in the Summer Seize of Osaka Castle. With two other Igamonos, Suwo was in charge of covert operations in and out of Osaka Castle.

In 1717, the 8th generation Shogun Tokugawa Yoshimune, introduced a new intelligence system, the Oniwabanshu (gardeners), and some of Yoshimune's retainers joined the Hiroshiki Igamono. As a result, the clan became strengthened through marriages with Oniwaban members.

Rise of Meritocracy and the Scholar-Shinobi Lineage

In 1794 the shogunate introduced a meritocracy system based on Gakumon Gimmi (Recruitment examination) which started two years earlier and opened its offices to talent. The shinobi samurai started to place importance on academic achievement.

In 1802, under the 11th shogun, the head of the Shibata family, Jinshiro, was transferred to work in the shogunate's Gakumonsho (shogunate university). Jinshiro's son, Junzo was promoted to belong to the Hasei Goemon Group for his academic excellence and served as metsuke.

=== 1853-1868: "Era of Bakumatsu Ninshi" ===
The most noteworthy contributions to the society made by the members were done during the Bakumatsu period. There are two outstanding Edo ninshi personalities worthy of mention. One is Shibata Takenaka (also known as Shibata Sadataro Takenaka), and the other is Nagamochi Kohjiro Yoshiaki. They were brothers.

==== Shibata Sadataro Takenaka ====
Shibata Sadataro Takenaka (柴田 貞太郎 剛中; 1823–1877)

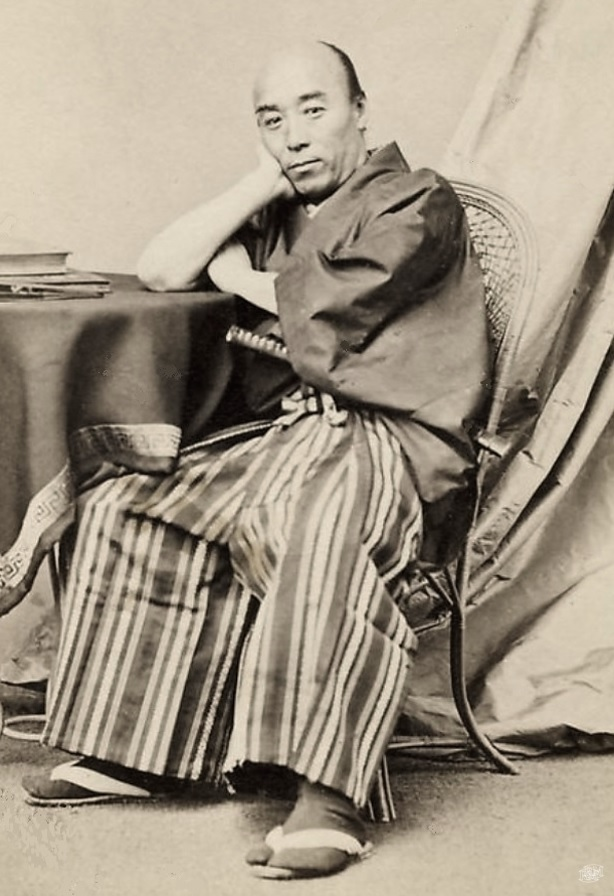
Shibata Sadataro Takenaka in Paris, 1862

He was one of the first Japanese samurai to visit Europe in 1862, then as the first emissary to station in France. (Shibata Mission/Japanese envoy to Europe in 1865).

In 1842 Shibata became metsuke (inspector), and the following year, awarded for his excellence in martial arts and the result in Gakumon Ginmi examination by the Tokugawa Shogunate.

In 1858 Shibata became chief of staff in the gaikoku bugyo dept. (foreign affairs department). Negotiated the matters regarding the opening of the Port of Yokohama, and finally managed to open the port to the world. Also assumed a leading position to negotiate with the delegations from the States and from Europe.

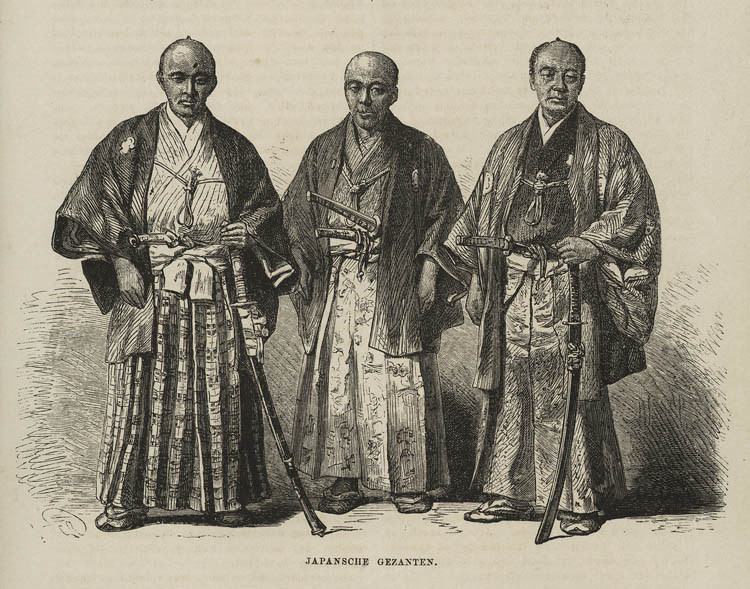
Shibata Sadataro Takenaka (center), Matsudaira (left), Takeuchi (right)

His first visit to Europe was in 1862 as one of the principal members of the First Japanese Embassy to Europe.

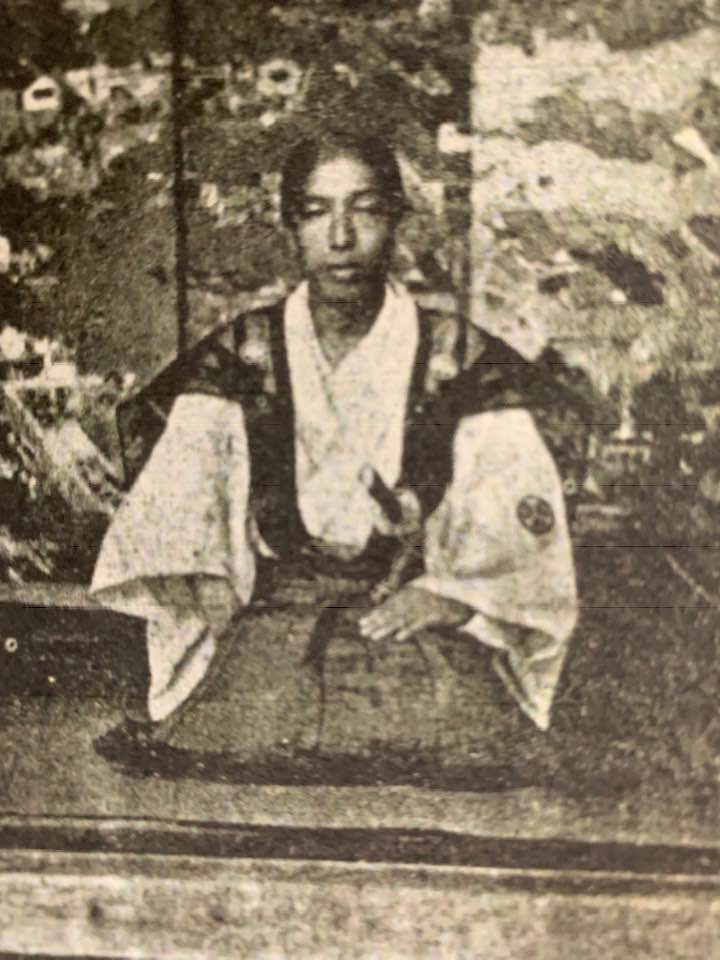
Nagamochi Kohjiro, diplomat in Bakumatsu era, younger brother of Shibata Sadataro Takenaka in Nagasaki

During the 1862 mission, Shibata was chief of staff and first secretary, and participated directly in the negotiations. Also, he was the key person for intelligence gathering in Europe. The newspapers of the time referred to him as "the shadow".

In 1863, he became gaikoku bugyo (commissioner of foreign affairs). His first assignment was to go to Hakodate to negotiate with a Russian consul general Joseph Antonovich Goskevich regarding the opening of Japanese ports.

In 1865, the Shibata Mission was dispatched to Europe. Shibata stationing in Paris for a year, requested that both the United Kingdom and France send a military mission for training the shogunate soldiers in Western warfare on behalf of the Tokugawa Shogunate. The UK declined, but the French accepted. This led to the first French military mission to Japan from 1867 to 1868, which Shibata organized. Shibata negotiated with the Rothchilds and European companies while conducting reconnaissance work.

Upon returning to Japan, he became in charge of the opening of the Port of Kobe, and had piers, residential areas for foreigners, and Tokugawa-do (Tokugawa Road) constructed. In 1868, he declared the Port of Kobe open to the world in front of foreign delegations.

==== Nagamochi Kohjiro Yoshiaki ====
Nagamochi Kohjiro Yoshiaki (永持 享次郎 穀明; 1826 – 1864)

In 1844 Nagamochi passed the Gakumon Ginmmi of the Shogunate. Nagamochi's expertise was in the fields of languages and naval defence. In 1853 serving as metsuke (inspector) he made a reconnaissance, as a Russian frigate "Diana" came in Nagasaki.

In 1854, he was transferred to Nagasaki, as one of the candidates for the captain of Kankohmaru presented by the government of the Netherlands to the Shogunate. Then in 1855, he was appointed as chief of staff at Nagasaki Bugyo Magistrate Office where he established the first language school to teach English in Kyushu.

In October, 1855, visited a Russian admiral, Putyatin, and negotiated on the additional terms of the Russo-Japanese Treaty of Amity and Commerce, and finalized a general agreement except for the attribution of Sakhalin and the handling of indigenous people at Gyokusenji Temple in Shimoda. The construction of Nagasaki Iron Mill started and Nagamochi was appointed to take charge of general affairs accounting.

In 1857, visited Janus Henricus Donker Curtius, the director of the Dutch trading house in Dejima, Nagasaki, and learned the details of the Opium War in China, and reported it to Nagasaki Bugyo Magistrate. In 1860, reconnaissance work in April, after a Russian Frigate "Posadnik" appeared in Tsushima. Investigating the occupation attempts by the Russian troop from the "Posadnik", Nagamochi negotiated with the Russian captain Nikolai Alekseevich Birilev to withdraw from Tshushima.(Posadnik Incident)

In 1863, became president of foreign affairs delegation and commander of foot soldiers. In 1864, Transferred to Kyoto as metsuke to be under the direct command of the 15th Shogun, Tokugawa Yoshinobu, to guard the Imperial Palace leading 212 samurai.

On November 9, 1867, Taisei Hokan (大政奉還) (restoration of the government to the crown) took place and the clan became secluded.

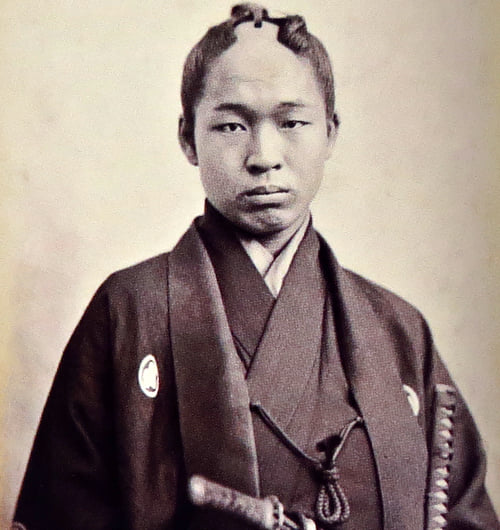
Nagamochi Gorōji, a samurai and member of the 1862 Takenouchi mission to Europe

=== After 1868: "Era of modern ninshi" ===
The Order of Shinobi Samurai has defined the modern ninshi as "a person with expertise, belongs to the organization, finds and assembles information, and works for a common goal while walking the path of Harmony (和)" The order is open to all who can abide by the order creed.

Nagamochi Gorohji Akinori (永持 五郎次 明徳; 1845 – 1903)

Learned Dutch and accompanied his uncle Shibata Sadataro Takenaka to visit Europe in 1862 as a member of the First Japanese Embassy to Europe. After returning to Japan he became a French teacher and Japanese Army lieutenant colonel. He was the Japanese father-in-law of a French captain Jules Brunet. In 1891 became the first president of Tokugawa Ikueikai Ikueigaku school, the predecessor of the present Tokyo University of Agriculture.

Shibata Sen'ichi Tatsunojo (柴田 専一 龍之丞; 1888 – 1956)

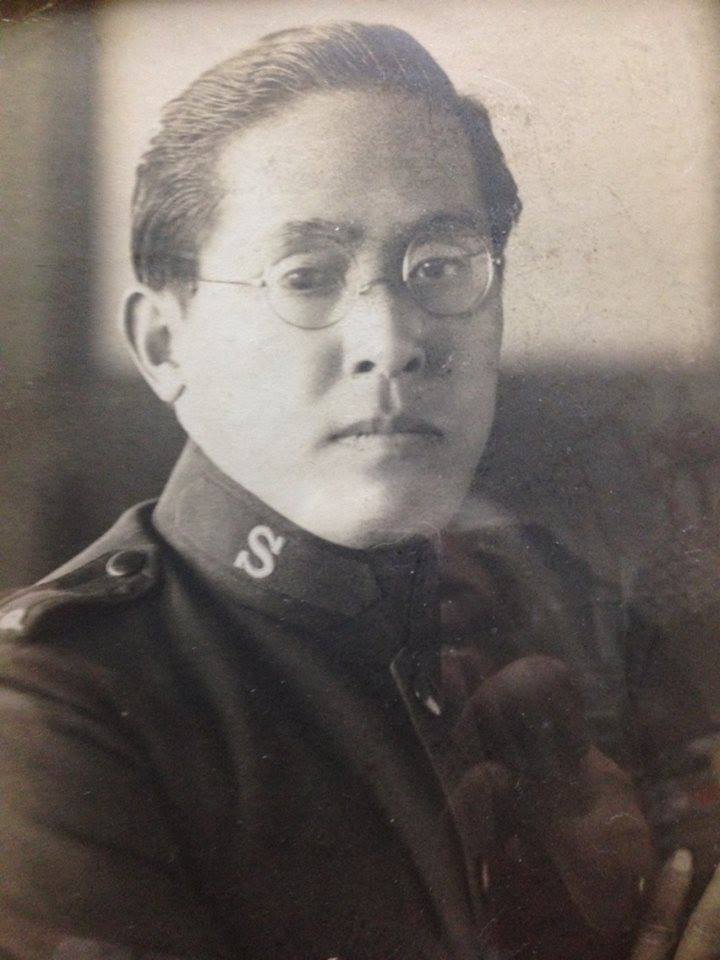
Shibata Sen'ichi Tatsunojo Salvationist

In 1917 Shibata Sen' ichi Tatsunojo reformed the order as he joined the Salvation Army. He instructed the order to be a secret society for 50 years after his death.

Shibata Jin'ichi Tetusbunsai (柴田 仁一 鉄聞斎; 1928 – 2016)

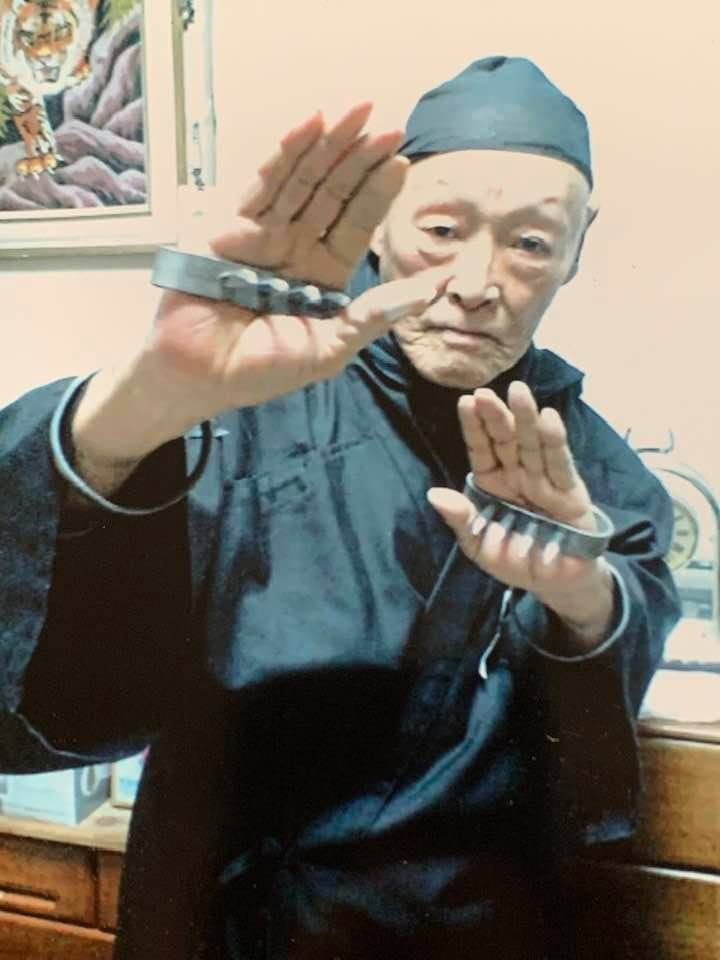
柴田仁一鉄聞斎

In 1951 Shibata Jin'ichi Tetsubunsai reorganized the order as Musashi Clan and opened a workshop to teach the shinobi family arts.

Shibata Kiyomi Suzak (柴田 清美 朱雀; 1951 –) In 2006, Jidai Academy was established by the order in Tabata, Tokyo after the 50th memorial of Sen'ichi Tatsunojo. Their family arts were named Musashi-Shibata-ryu.

In 2014 the academy became an LLC Musashi Ichizoku.

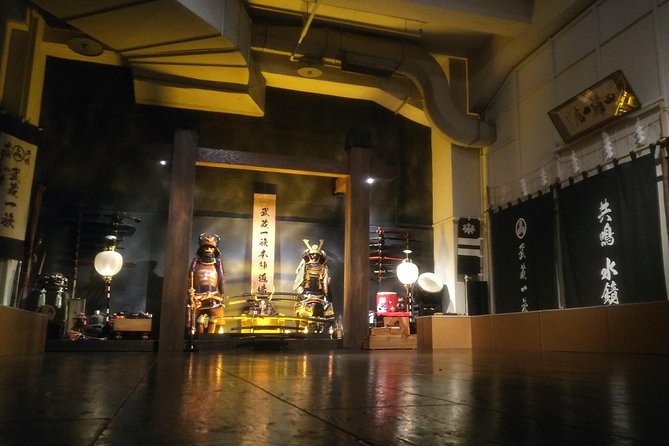
Musashi Ninja Clan Honjin Dojo is located in front of Tokyo Tower in Shibakoen, Minato, Tokyo

In 2017 the Headquarters was moved to Shibakoen, Minato, Tokyo (Japan Society for the Promotion of Machinery Industry Building 機会振興会館)

For decades the order has systematized its traditions, and codified them as the fundamental principles and guidelines.

In 2019 its fundamental philosophy was presented as "The Code of Shinobi Samurai", or "Ninshido" in the annual congress of the International Ninja Research Association.

Musashi Ninshidan, NPO (NPO法人 武蔵忍士団)

In 2019, The Order of Musashi Shinobi Samurai, NPO (Musashi Ninshidan NPO - NPO法人 武蔵忍士団) was founded by Kazuhiro Aizawa, Kiyomi Shibata, and Mayumi Shindo and 7 other members. The vision of the NPO is a sustainable and peaceful world where every person thrives, and the present purpose of the order is to contribute to the public interest by conducting projects related to promoting culture and international exchange besides its century-old aim of training its members to be full-fledged shinobi.

In the same year the order established its transnational research center with Kenryu Hayek (chief administrator) and Ulises Villa Huesca. The research center fortifies the ninshi think tank by providing information throughout the world. Intelligence gathering has been historically the main mission of the shinobi order. The order advocates Ninshido as a valid framework for today and for the future.

Ninshidan Europe, NPO (NPO法人 欧州忍士団)

In 2021 an NPO in Europe was established with the name Ninshidan Europe as Sven Kristjan Kreisberg as chairman.

Musashi Ninshidan, NPO (NPO法人 武蔵忍士団)

In May 2023, the main headquarters dōjō was relocated to Matsugaya, Taitō Ward, prompting the associated NPO dōjō to move to the same location.

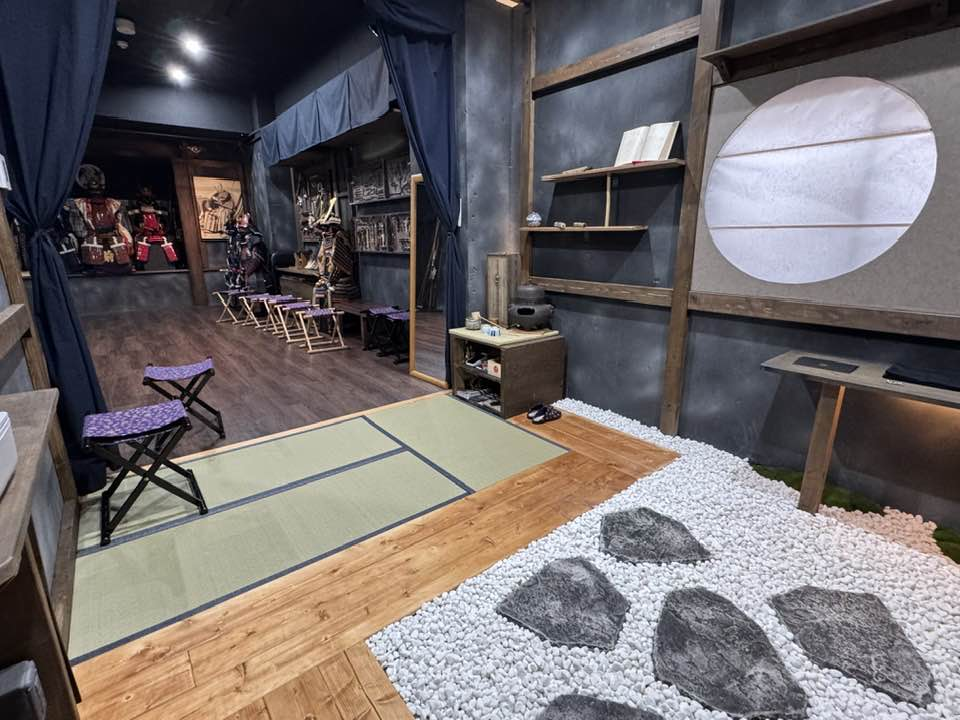
忍士本陣道場

== The development of Ninshido ==
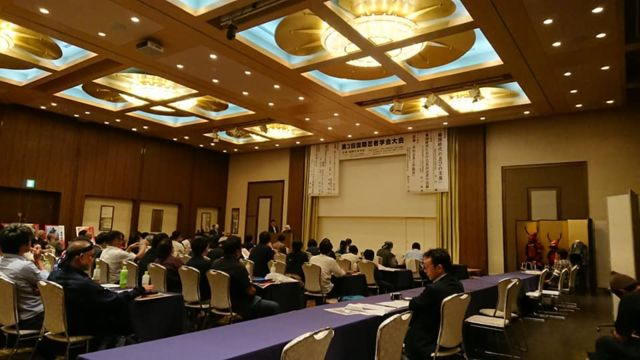
Academic presentation at International Ninja Research Association 2019

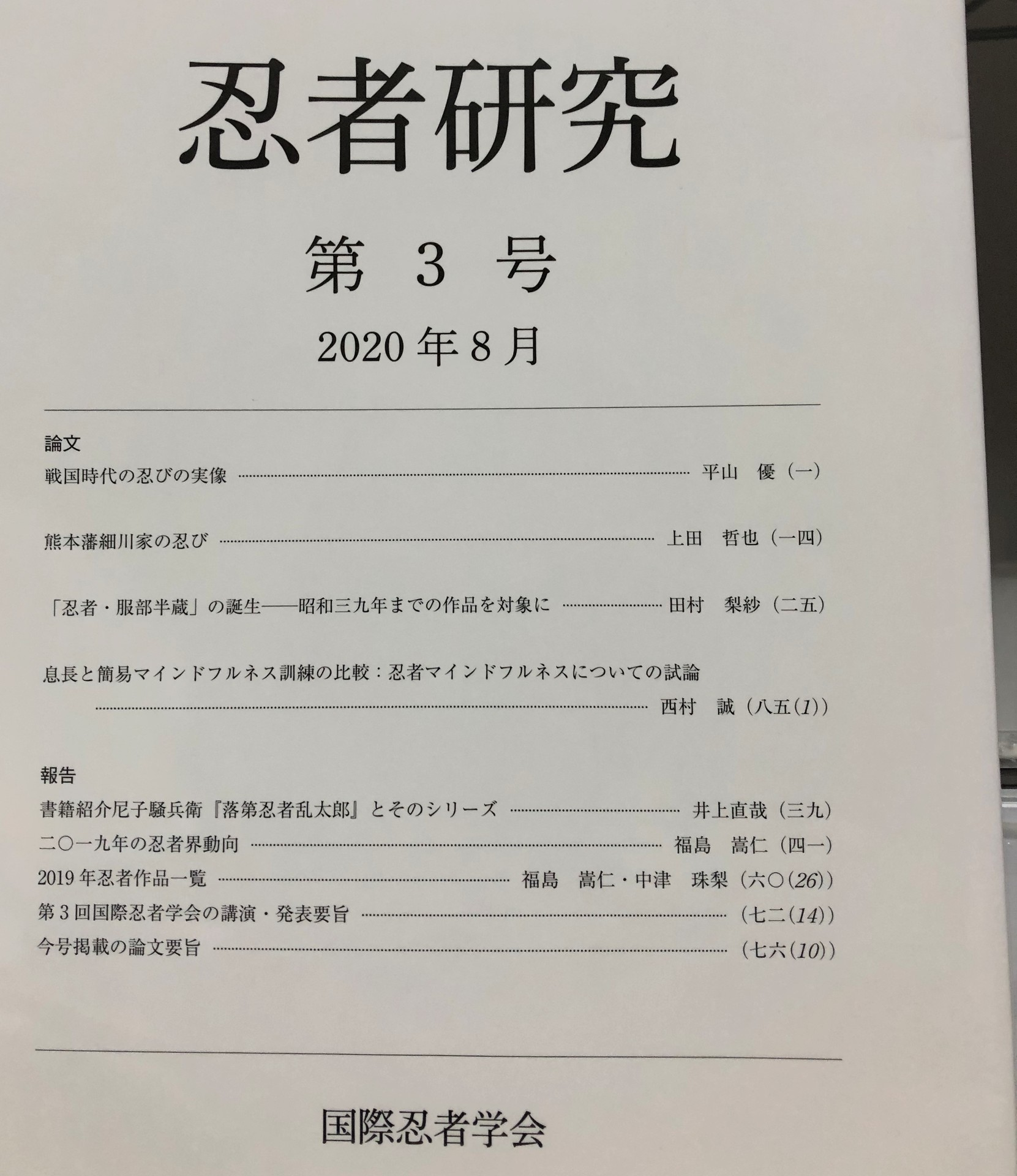
Ninja Research Report #3

In 2019 an academic presentation titled "Ninshido: The New paradigm of the Order of Shinobi Samurai" was made by Kazuhiro Aizawa and Kiyomi Shibata (The NPO Musashi Order of Shinobi Samurai), at the 4th annual convention of the International Ninja Research Association in Nagano in 2019.

According to Mansenshukai(Bansenshukai), the shinobi's ethics was "seishin" (正心 right-mindedness), which encouraged the shinobi to be loyal to their feudal clients and not to use their arts for themselves. But this was not enough for the shinobsamurai to serve the shogunate, as "seishin" could be used as justifications of arbitrary conducts.

With the introduction of the Gakumon Ginmi (学問吟味) recruitment exams in 1792 by the shogunate, which required the examinees to study Confucianism and neo-Confucianism. Especially the Neo-Confucianist ideas were combined with the old shinobi mindsets that new ninshi philosophical ideas started to develop emphasizing on Gotoku (五徳 Five Virtues), Gogyo (五行 Five Elements), and Sansai (三才 Three Powers).

Philosophy of “Kyōmei Mizukagami” and the Principle of “Nin-soku-Wa”(忍即和 Harmony Through the Way of the Shinobi）

In 2006, the Musashi Order of Shinobi Samurai established its foundational philosophy: “to maintain the heart like a water mirror and resonate with others.” This concept was named Kyōmei Mizukagami (Empathetic Resonance & Water Mirror). It emphasizes cultivating a tranquil and reflective mind—like a still water surface—that can faithfully perceive the surrounding conditions and emotional states of others, thereby fostering harmonious resonance.

Within the training system, the ultimate goal is the realization of Wa (harmony). The highest-level techniques are known as Kyōmei no Jutsu (Art of Resonance) or Kanjizai no Jutsu (Art of Observing Freedom), which embody the ideal of harmony between self, others, and nature. The culmination of shinobi training is to attain a state of “Kyōmei = Wa.”

This philosophy is structured into a three-stage process:

1. Situational Awareness (Kū / Emptiness) The practitioner maintains a calm and reflective heart, like a water mirror, and uses the behavioral conditions of the Three Powers—Heaven (Ten), Earth (Chi), and Humanity (Jin)—to observe and understand the essence of phenomena without bias. This stage is referred to as “Situational Water Mirror,” representing objective awareness rooted in the principle of Kū (emptiness).

2. Analysis and Judgment (Kan / Sensibility) Based on the information gathered, the practitioner applies the behavioral guidelines of the Four Phases—Forest (Rin), Wind (Fū), Thunder (Rai), and Shade (In)—to make optimal decisions. This stage integrates intuition and logic.

3. Optimal Response (Wa / Harmony) Guided by the principles of the Five Elements—Earth, Water, Fire, Wind, and Void—the practitioner responds flexibly and effectively to changing circumstances. This is known as the Gorin Ninpō (Five-Ring Shinobi Method), which forms the core of shinobi technique. Through training and experience, these techniques are systematized and adapted to various situations.

This entire process is collectively referred to as Kanno = Kanjizai-hō (Resonant Observation Method), and the ultimate aim of the shinobi is expressed as Shin-soku-Wa—“to realize harmony through the practice of shinobi.”

Shinobishidō and Educational Philosophy

The philosophical foundation of Ninshidō is rooted in the ethical teachings found in the Edo-period ninjutsu manual Bansenshūkai. The text asserts that “the ethics of the shinobi lie in ‘Seishin’ (right-mindedness), and that shinobi should remain loyal to their employers and never use ninjutsu for personal gain.” However, shinobi who served the Tokugawa shogunate recognized the risk of “Seishin” being misused to justify arbitrary actions, and thus sought higher ethical standards.

Following the introduction of the Gakumon Ginmi (Academic Examination) system in 1792, shinobi were educated from childhood in the Four Books and Five Classics of Confucianism. Teachings such as Neo-Confucianism, the Five Virtues, Five Elements, and the Three Powers (Ten-Chi-Jin) influenced the formation of Ninshi philosophy. By the time Nitobe Inazō systematized Bushidō, the moral and ethical foundations of Ninshidō had similarly matured.

The Musashi Order views the evolution of Ninshi ethics as a dynamic adaptation to changing times, with traditions continuing into the present. Its educational system incorporates Ninshidō, presenting members with the principles of Gorin Ninpō and Kyōmei. Behavioral guidelines are expressed through the motto Rin-Fū-Rai-In.

Gorin Ninpō is based on the Buddhist concept of the Five Great Elements (Earth, Water, Fire, Wind, Void), and systematizes tactical applications corresponding to each element. Members adopt this philosophy as a foundation for community service, aiming to cultivate integrated mind-body discipline, develop unwavering composure, and ultimately attain the state of Nin-soku-Wa.

Ninshi education is seen not only as a contribution to a positive paradigm within the ninja community but also as a means of character development. The Musashi Order advocates that the wisdom of the Ninshi remains applicable and valuable in the modern era.

In 1989, the fundamental philosophy was named Kyohmei (共鳴 Empathetic Resonance) and Mizu kagami (水鏡 Water Mirror), and the ultimate purpose of the members training was to be one with ku (空 large universe) or “無我 no-self.

The order maintains that Ninshido has evolved and has adapted to changes that the ninshi traditions have survived to this date. The Ninishido ideas have been incorporated in the order's practical educational system so the members can learn a collection of strategies called "Gorin ninpo" (五輪忍法) and the "Kyohmei" guideline" to serve their communities as shinobi should. Through training, the members efficiently learn to integrate their mental and physical strengths, which will cultivate their inner fortitude to be equanimous under any circumstance.

The ninshi education helps to develop a more positive shinobi paradigm in the world as well as to help mold members personalities. The timeless ninshi wisdom can be effectively utilized in this modern age.

== Activity ==
2007-2017 Establishment of a martial arts dojo "Jidai Academy" in Tabata

2017–2023 April Management of a Martial arts dojo "Shinobi Samurai Honjin Dojo" in Shibakoen

2023–Present The Honjin of the clan was relocated to the Kappabashi area on May 1 of 2024. Address: 3-1-13 Matsugaya, Taito-City, Tokyo

The order has become a small think and do tank following the footsteps of the ninshi forefathers to work for world peace. This organization provides the public with seminars, workshops, events for the purpose of promoting culture, international exchange, tourism, etc., and with projects related to information gathering.

2019 Published an academic textbook for interpreter-students featuring the memory training used in shinobi training of the order.

=== The Creed ===
- 1. Keep a water mirror in your heart and resonate with others with compassion
- 2. Be unwavering and harmonious; conquer anger and persevere in tribulation.
- 3. Understand the laws of nature and make use of opportunities, and survive to fulfill your mission.
- 4. Take the facts to heart: The fundamental duties of shinobi are gathering intelligence, and guarding confidentiality.
- 5. Observe and act with no sound, no scent, and expect no recognition.

=== Densho Scroll, Menkyo, Kuden ===
Densho (伝書）usually takes a form of "makimono" (巻物 scroll) where the teaching and knowledge of the school are written and/or drawn.

Menkyo (免許) means "license". It refers to the license to teach used by practitioners of Japanese classical arts and martial arts certifying some license within the school or ryū.

Upon receiving a menkyo each practitioner swears not to reveal the secret arts and signs it.

Kuden (口伝) is a method of orally transmitting information. Especially in weapon crafting, the techniques are shown, and explained orally from masters to students.

Den'i (伝位) Ranks by Scroll Titles

- Kirigami: entry level. After learning five basic principles.
- Mokuroku: certificate, and entered into official rolls.
- Makimono: Scroll, Menkyo: License.
  - Shoden:experience: 3–5 years.
  - Chuden:experience: over 5 years.
  - Okuden Menkyo:experience: over 10 years.
  - Menkyo Kaiden:private instruction from the grandmaster (1 hour x 8 times)
  - Gokuden:Honorary licence to a holder of Menkyo Kaiden.

Recently dan-kyu system has been added for interpreter ranking

=== Handcrafted Ningu of the Order ===
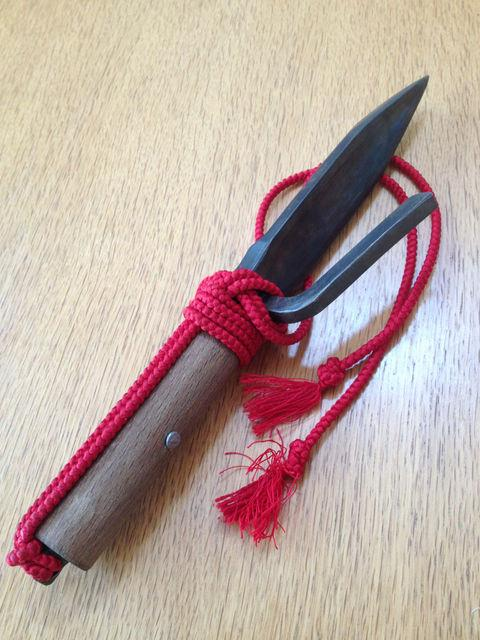
武蔵流 頭目苦無

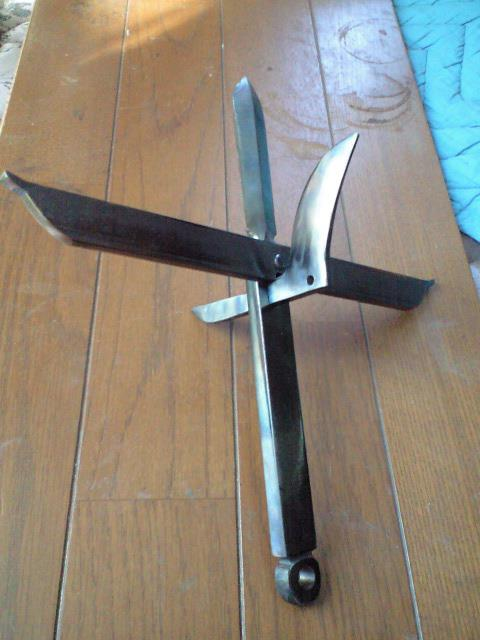
武蔵流 まろほし

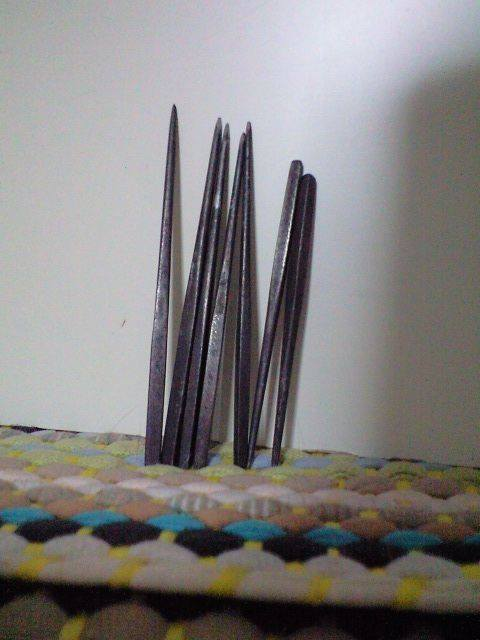
武蔵流 針

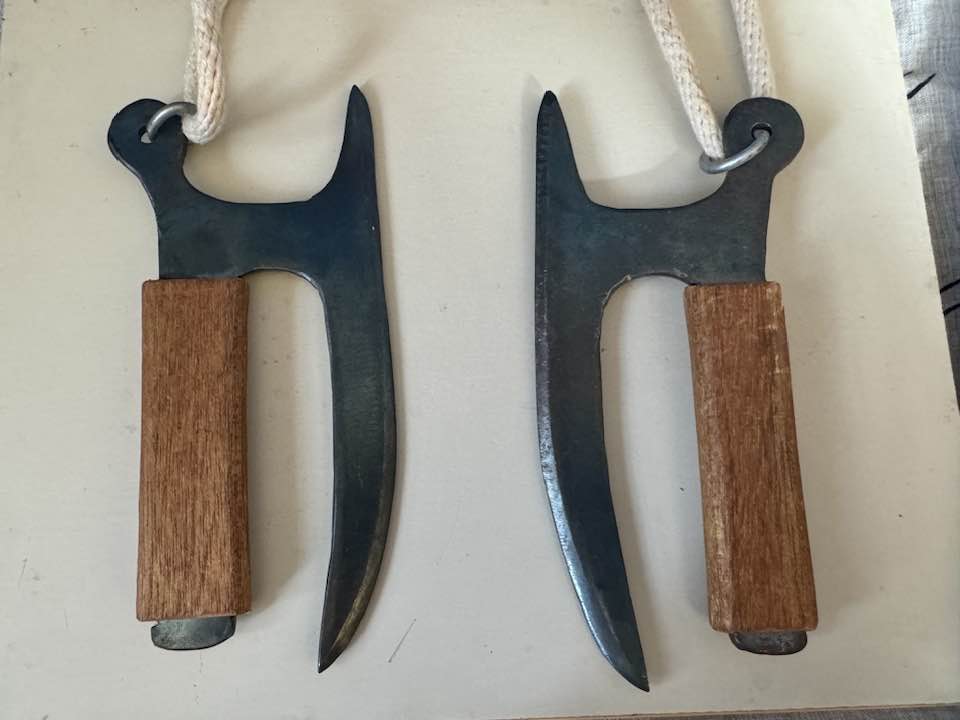
武蔵流 刃手斧

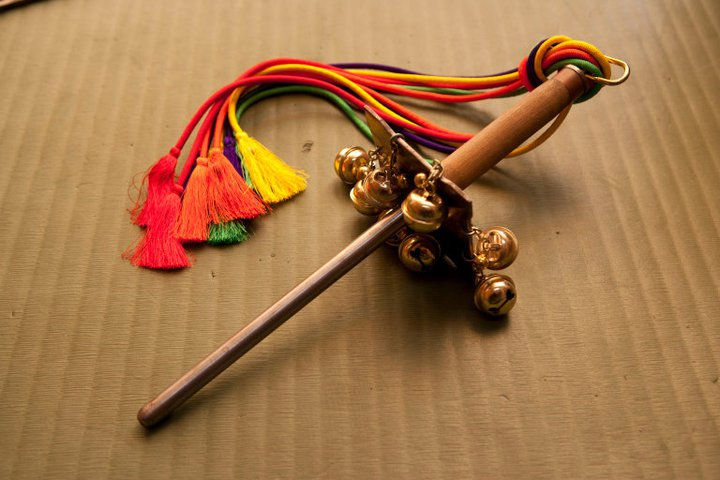
武蔵流 八鈴十手

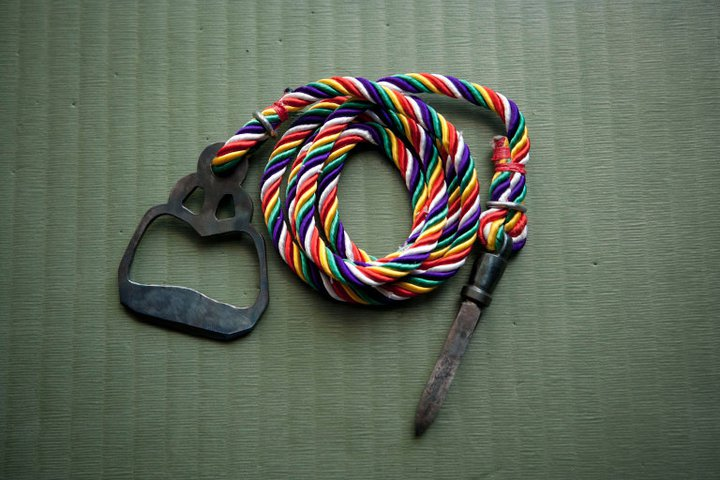
武蔵流 羂索

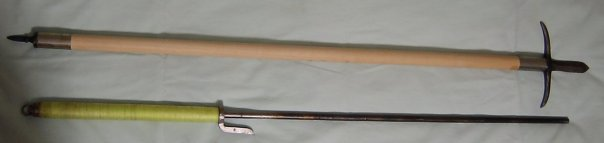
武蔵流 長十手と打越槍

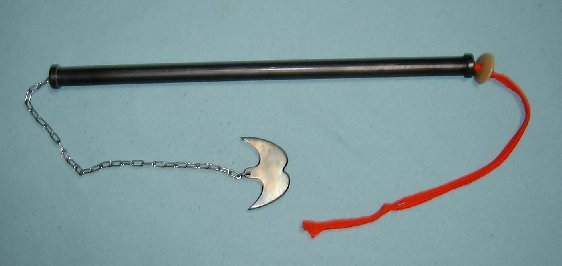
千鳥鉄 (ちどりがね）

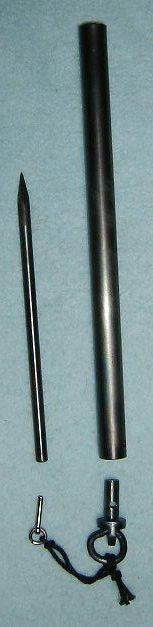
仕込みなえし

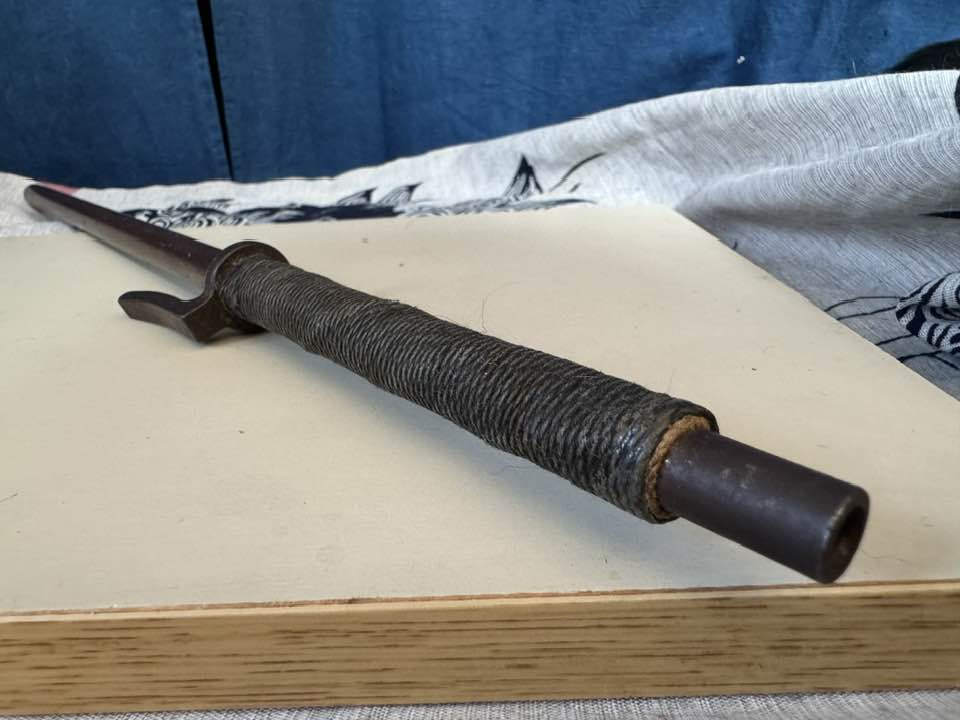
吹き矢十手

== See also ==
- French–Japanese relations
- Clan
- Shinobi
- Ninja
