= France–Japan relations =

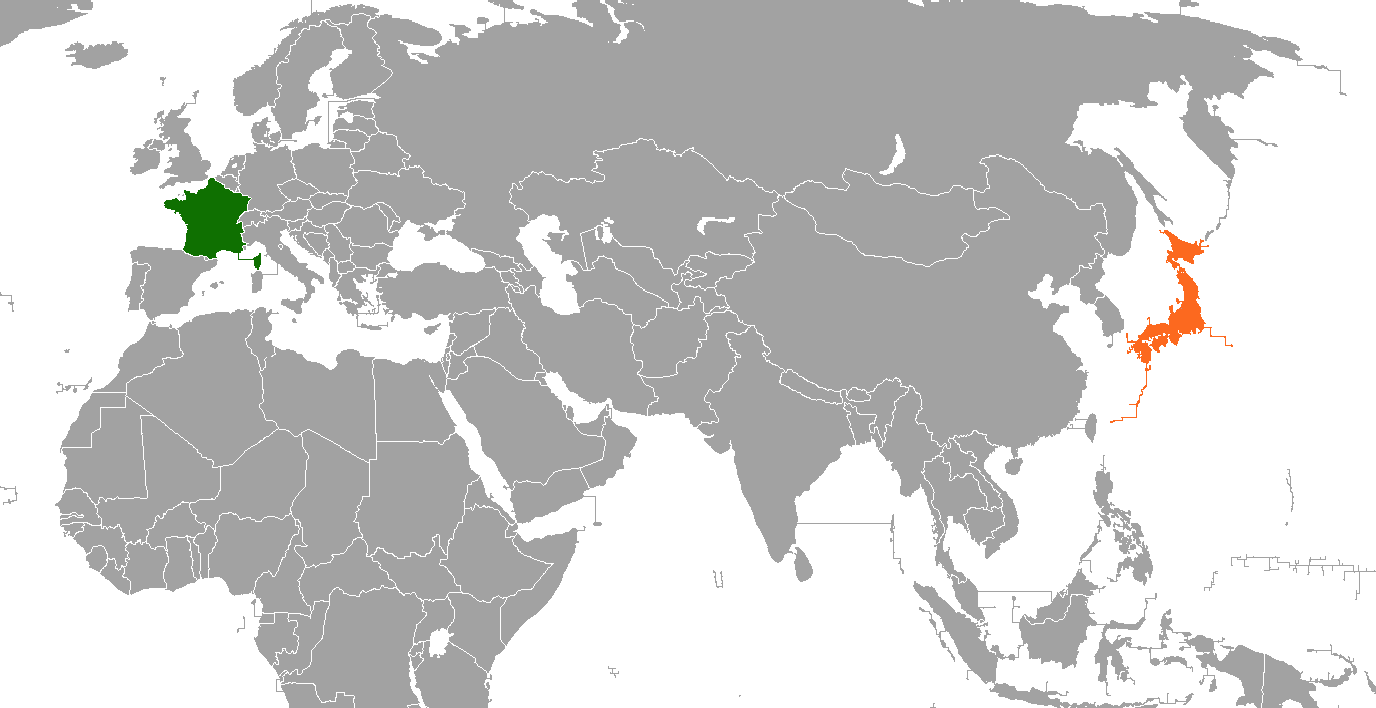
- France: Japan

Diplomatic mission
- Embassy of France, Tokyo: Embassy of Japan, Paris

The France–Japan relations are the current and historical relations between France and Japan. The history of relations between France and Japan goes back to the early 17th century, when the Japanese samurai and ambassador, Hasekura Tsunenaga, making his way to Rome, landed for a few days in Saint-Tropez, creating a sensation.

== Chronology of Franco-Japanese relations ==
=== 17th–18th centuries ===
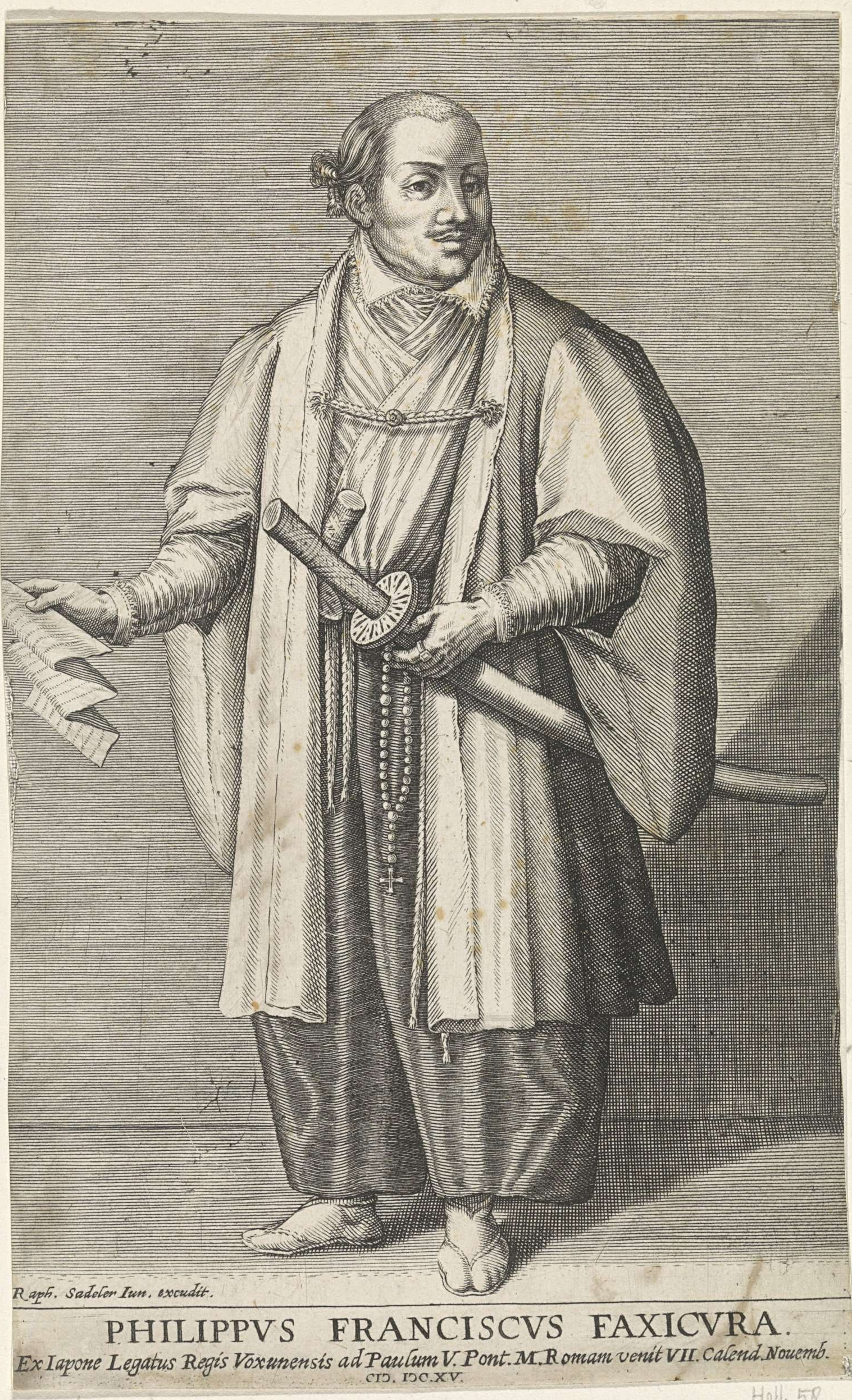
17th-century account of Hasekura's visit to France

- 1615: Hasekura Tsunenaga, a Japanese samurai and ambassador who arrived at Coria del Rio, Spain, sent to Rome by Date Masamune, lands at Saint-Tropez for a few days, initiating the first contacts between France and Japan.
- 1619: François Caron, son of French Huguenot refugees to the Netherlands enters the Dutch East India Company, and becomes the first person of French origin to set foot in Japan in 1619. He stays in Japan for 20 years, where he becomes a Director for the company. He later became the founding Director General of the French East India Company in 1664.
- 1636: Guillaume Courtet, a French Dominican priest, sets foot in Japan. He penetrates into Japan in clandestinity, against the 1613 interdiction of Christianity. He is caught, tortured, and dies in Nagasaki on September 29, 1637.
- No French people visit Japan between 1640 and 1780.
- Around 1700, the impostor known as George Psalmanazar claims to come from the Japanese tributary island of Formosa.
- 1787: Jean-François de Galaup, comte de Lapérouse (1741–1788) navigates in Japanese waters in 1787. He visits the Ryukyu Islands, and the strait between Hokkaidō and Sakhalin, giving it his name.

=== 19th century ===
- 1808: The French language is taught to five Japanese translators by the Dutch chief of Dejima, Hendrik Doeff.
- 1844: A French naval expedition under Captain Fornier-Duplan onboard Alcmène visits Okinawa on April 28, 1844. Trade is denied, but Father Forcade is left behind with a translator.
- 1846: Admiral Jean-Baptiste Cécille arrives in Nagasaki, but is denied landing.
- 1855: In an effort to find the Russian fleet in the Pacific Ocean during the Crimean War, a French-British naval force reaches the port of Hakodate, open to British ships as a result of the Anglo-Japanese Friendship Treaty of 1854, and sails further North, seizing the Russian-American Company's possessions on the island of Urup in the Kuril archipelago. The Treaty of Paris (1856) restitutes the island to Russia.
- 1855: Following the opening of Japan by the American Commodore Perry, France obtains a treaty with Okinawa on November 24, 1855.
- 1858: The Treaty of Amity and Commerce between France and Japan is signed in Edo on October 9, 1858, by Jean-Baptiste Louis Gros, opening diplomatic relations between the two countries.
- 1859: Arrival of Gustave Duchesne de Bellecourt.

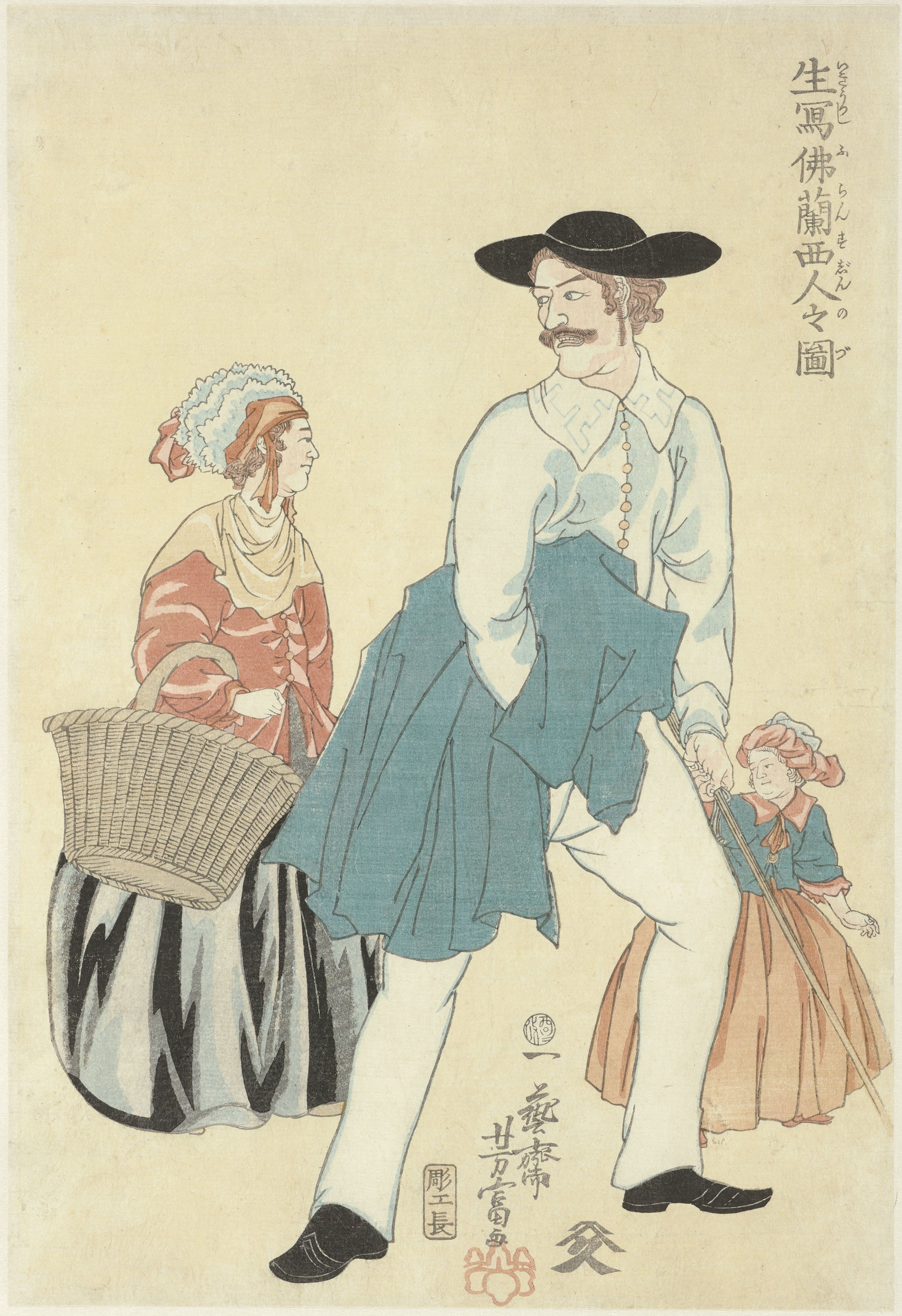
French family in Yokohama, 1861

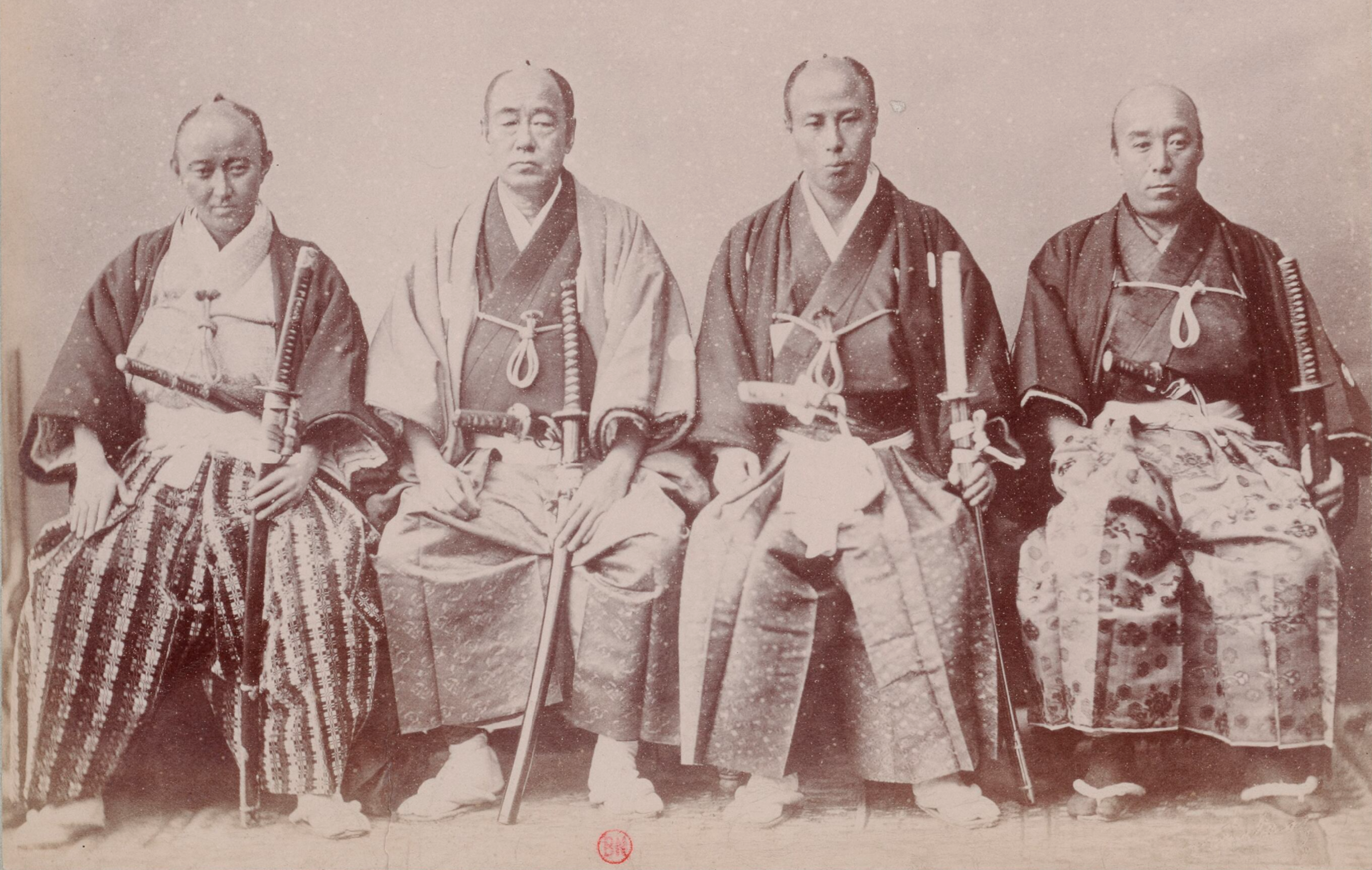
The First Japanese Embassy to Europe, in 1862

- 1862: Shōgun Tokugawa Iemochi sends First Japanese Embassy to Europe, led by Takenouchi Yasunori.
- 1863: Second Japanese Embassy to Europe

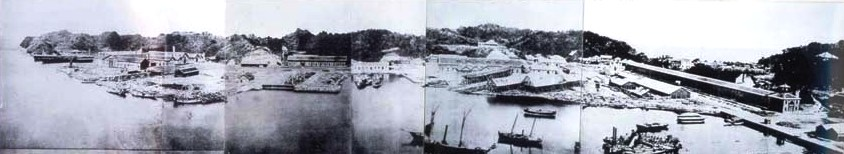
Leonce Verny directed the construction of Japan's first modern arsenal at Yokosuka from 1865.

- 1864: Arrival of Leon Roches in Japan.
- 1864: Bombardment of Shimonoseki by allied ships (9 British, 3 French, 4 Dutch, 1 American).
- 1864: In November Leonce Verny arrives in Japan for the construction of the Yokosuka Naval Arsenal.
- 1865: Shibata Takenaka visits France to prepare for the construction of the Yokosuka arsenal and organize a French military mission to Japan.
- 1865: On September 12, 1865, the Messageries Maritimes passenger liner ship Dupleix was the first to call at a Japanese port to start a new service with France, both for passengers as well as for cargoes such as Japanese silk.

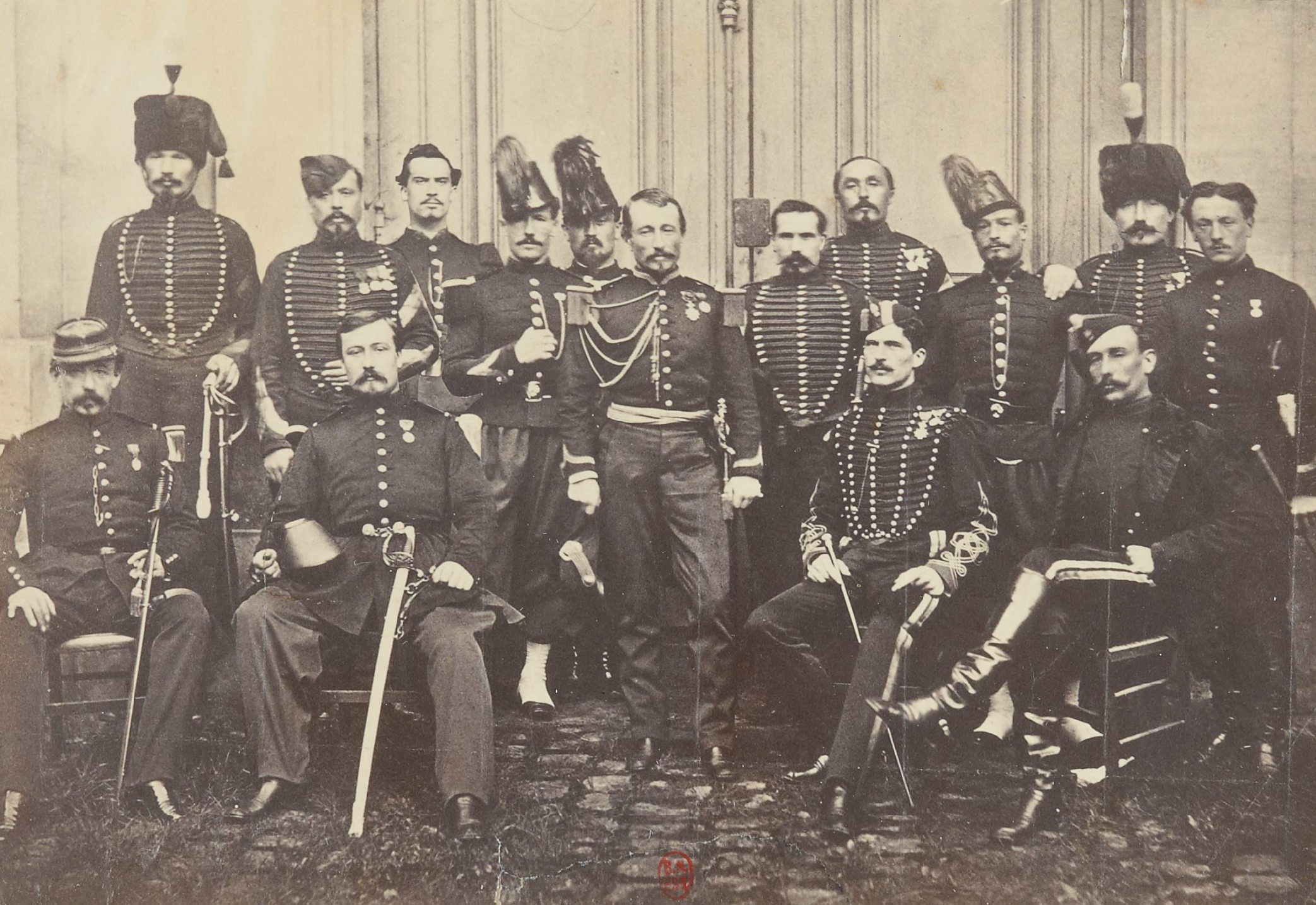
The first French military mission to Japan in 1867. Jules Brunet in front, second from right.

- 1867: The first French Military Mission to Japan arrives in Yokohama January 13, 1867. Among them is Captain Jules Brunet.
- 1867: Japan sends a delegation to the 1867 World Fair in Paris.
- 1867: The French mining engineer Jean Francisque Coignet is sent to Satsuma Domain and is put in charge of the silver mines of Ikuno in 1868.
- 1868: Kobe incident (February 4). A fight erupts in Kobe between 450 samurai of Okayama Domain and French sailors, leading to the occupation of central Kobe by foreign troops.
- 1868: Eleven French sailors from the Dupleix are killed in the Sakai incident, in Sakai, near Osaka, by southern rebel forces.
- 1869: Former French advisors under Jules Brunet fight alongside the last Tokugawa shogunate loyalists of Enomoto Takeaki, against Imperial troops in the Battle of Hakodate.
- 1870: Henri Pelegrin directs the construction of Japan's first gas-lighting system in the streets of Nihonbashi, Ginza and Yokohama.
- 1872: Paul Brunat opens the first modern Japanese silk spinning factory at Tomioka. Three craftsmen from the Nishijin weaving district in Kyoto travel to Lyon. They travel back to Japan in 1873, importing a Jacquard loom.
- 1872: Start of the second French Military Mission to Japan (1872-1880).
- 1873: The legal expert Gustave Emile Boissonade arrives in Japan to help build a modern legal system.
- 1874: The Second French Military Mission is sent to Japan, and builds the military school of Ichigaya, the start of the Imperial Japanese Army Academy.
- 1882: The first tramways are introduced from France and start functioning at Asakusa, and between Shinbashi and Ueno.
- 1884: Third French Military Mission to Japan (1884-1889).
- 1886: The French naval engineer Emile Bertin starts a four years' stay in Japan to advise the government on how to reinforce the Imperial Japanese Navy with new modern ships, and directs the expansion and modernization of the Yokosuka Naval Arsenal and the design and initial construction of the new arsenals of Kure and Sasebo, thereby contributing to the Japanese victory in the Russo-Japanese War in 1905. He was special adviser to Emperor Mutsuhito for naval development and was awarded by the Japanese government with the titles of Takaku Yaku nin et Chokunin.

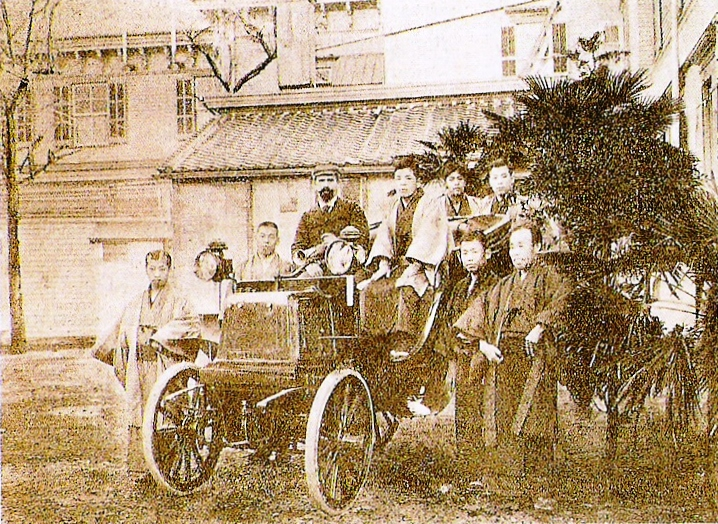
The first automobile in Japan, a French Panhard-Levassor, in 1898

- 1898: The first automobile (a Panhard-Levassor) is introduced in Japan.

=== 20th century ===
- 1907: Signing of the Franco-Japanese Treaty of 1907. France took the lead in creating alliances with Japan, Russia and (informally) with Britain. Japan wanted to raise a loan in Paris, so France made the loan contingent on a Russo-Japanese agreement and a Japanese guaranty for France's strategically vulnerable possessions in Indochina. Britain encouraged the Russo-Japanese rapprochement. Thus was built the Triple Entente coalition that fought World War I.
- 1909: The first Japanese mechanical flight, a biplane glider tractored by an automobile, occurs in Ueno through the collaboration of Shiro Aihara and Le Prieur at a French military attaché in Tokyo.
- 1910: Captain Tokugawa Yoshitoshi, trained in France as a pilot, makes the first self-propelled flight on board a Henri Farman plane.
- 1910: Sakichi Toyoda, founder of the Toyota Corporation, visits France to study spinning techniques.
- 1918: Fourth French Military Mission to Japan (1918–1919)
- 1919: France supported Japanese racial equality proposal in Paris Peace Conference.
- 1924: First air flight from France to Japan, by Pelletier Doisy and Besin.
- 1925: First air flight from Japan to France, by Kawauchi and Abe.
- 1927: French-Japanese agreement grants most favoured nations treatment to Japanese in French Indochina and to Indochinese subjects in Japan.
- 1940: Start of the Japanese invasion of French Indochina.
- 1941: Japan pressures the Vichy France into making important military concessions in French Indochina, but leaves the French army and administration intact.
- 1943: Guangzhouwan, a small French enclave on the southern coast of China, is occupied by the Japanese.
- 1945: Japanese coup d'état in French Indochina—Japanese troops rapidly attack and take full control of French Indochina, which Japan maintains until its defeat several months later in September 1945, when Vietnam declared its independence from France and Japan, following the August General Uprising.
- 1946–1950: Japanese war criminals are tried in Saigon for their action in Indochina during the war.
- 1952: First Air France flight to Japan.
- 1970s-1990s: French & Japanese cooperation between animation & anime studios.
- 1997: "Year of Japan in France" and the opening of a Japanese cultural centre in Paris.
- 1998: "Year of France in Japan" in which 400 events took place across Japan to celebrate France and its people.

== Franco-Japanese relations today ==
In recent years, France has been strengthening trade and cultural exchanges with Japan. In June 1996, in Lyon, as part of the G7 summit which took place thanks to the crucial role played by the Consul General of Japan, Louis Michallet, Ryutaro Hashimoto and Jacques Chirac decided to organize "The Year of Japan in France", from April 1997 to March 1998 in order to correct the superficial and sometimes inaccurate understanding of Japanese culture. The start of that year coincided with the inauguration of the House of Culture of Japan in Paris. "The Year of France in Japan" followed "the Year of Japan", the combination of these two events inaugurating Franco-Japanese relations for the 21st century.

In June 2005, France and Japan announced a collaboration to build the next generation supersonic commercial aircraft, a successor to the Concorde. Commercial service is not expected until 2050.

Laurent Fabius, French Foreign Minister, met with Japanese Prime Minister Shinzo Abe as a courtesy call during a visit to Japan from 5 October to 6 October 2014. The meeting included Abe expressing his condolences for the ISIL beheading of French backpacker Hervé Gourdel and both agreed on future meetings on defense cooperation and tackling global warming.

=== Culture ===
Japan and France have strong mutual cultural influence, especially in the fields of art and cuisine. In Japan, French cuisine occupies a large place in the Japanese culinary world. Japanese painting and ukiyo-e and the modernity and elegance of French visual arts are fused in the creative field of painting. This has increased interest and affinity with France among Japanese people, and in recognition of her contribution, Riyoko Ikeda was awarded the Chevalier of the Legion of Honor by the French government. Additionally, France has had a deep influence in the creation and shaping of Japanese animation for decades, including many films from the renown Japanese animation studio Ghibli and its founder Hayao Miyazaki. Japanese entertainment, from manga and anime to video games, often uses historical figures from France or French-inspired settings, such as those from the Middle Ages, the Renaissance, the Enlightenment era, the Napoleonic era, the Belle Époque, and the World Wars. Franco-Japanese collaborations and mutual inspiration in the animation and entertainment industry are remarkable. Today many parts of Japanese pop culture such as manga and anime have become very popular among French people, with France being one of the largest anime markets and the second largest manga market in the world after Japan.

=== Nuclear collaborations ===
The two countries have been collaborating closely in the area of fission energy generation. In September 2013, two years after the Fukushima nuclear disaster, Japan has officially accepted help from France for the decommission and dismantle of Fukushima's reactors. Mitsubishi Heavy Industries, a Japanese corporation and France's Areva began cooperating on constructing a nuclear reactor in Turkey in 2013.

On 3 May 2023 French Minister for Energy Transition Agnes Pannier-Runacher and Japanese Minister of Economy, Trade and Industry Nishimura Yasutoshi signed an agreement to develop sodium-cooled fast reactors.

== French in Japan ==
- Pierre Barouh, songwriter and composer, singer
- Louis-Émile Bertin, naval engineer in Japan from 1886 to 1890
- Siegfried Bing, an art collector and dealer who pioneered Japonism
- Gustave Emile Boissonade in Japan from 1873 to 1895
- Georges Bigot, artist
- Nicolas Bouvier, Swiss francophone writer
- Jules Brunet, military officer
- Paul Claudel, French ambassador in Tokyo from 1922 to 1928
- Julie Dreyfus, actress
- Claude Farrère, writer
- Michael Ferrier, writer in Japan since 1992
- Émile Étienne Guimet, industrialist and art collector
- Pierre Loti, writer
- Bernard Petitjean, Roman Catholic priest who served as a missionary to Japan and became the country's first vicar apostolic.
- Léon Roches, diplomat
- Léonce Verny, naval engineer in Japan from 1865 to 1876
- Léon de Rosny, linguist and Japanologist
- Charles Descantons de Montblanc, diplomat

== Japanese in France ==
- Hasekura Tsunenaga
- Fukuzawa Yukichi as a translator in 1862 mission
- Shibata Takenaka (1823–1878)
- Tsuguharu Foujita (in France from 1913 to 1931)
- Tetsumi Kudo
- Kenzo Takada
- Akira Mizubayashi
- Hiroaki Takada
- Tarō Okamoto
- Kafū Nagai
- Hidetoshi Murakami

== Multilateral organizations ==
Both nations are members of the United Nations, Organisation for Economic Co-operation and Development, G7 and G20 major economies, World Trade Organization, and among others.

== Resident diplomatic missions ==
- France has an embassy in Tokyo and a consulate-general in Kyoto.
- Japan has an embassy in Paris and a consulates-general in Marseille and Strasbourg and a consular office in Lyon and Nouméa.
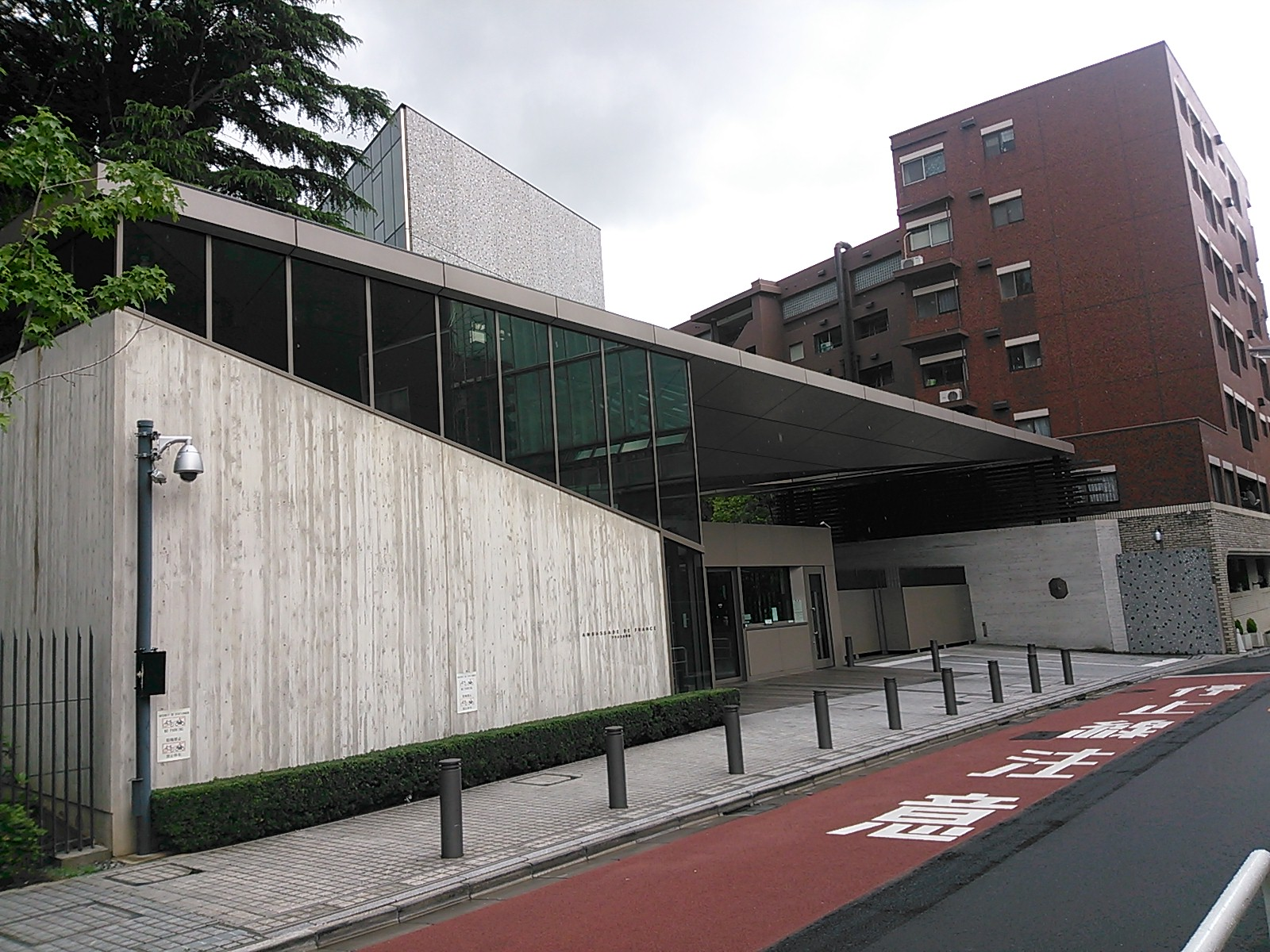
Embassy of France in Tokyo

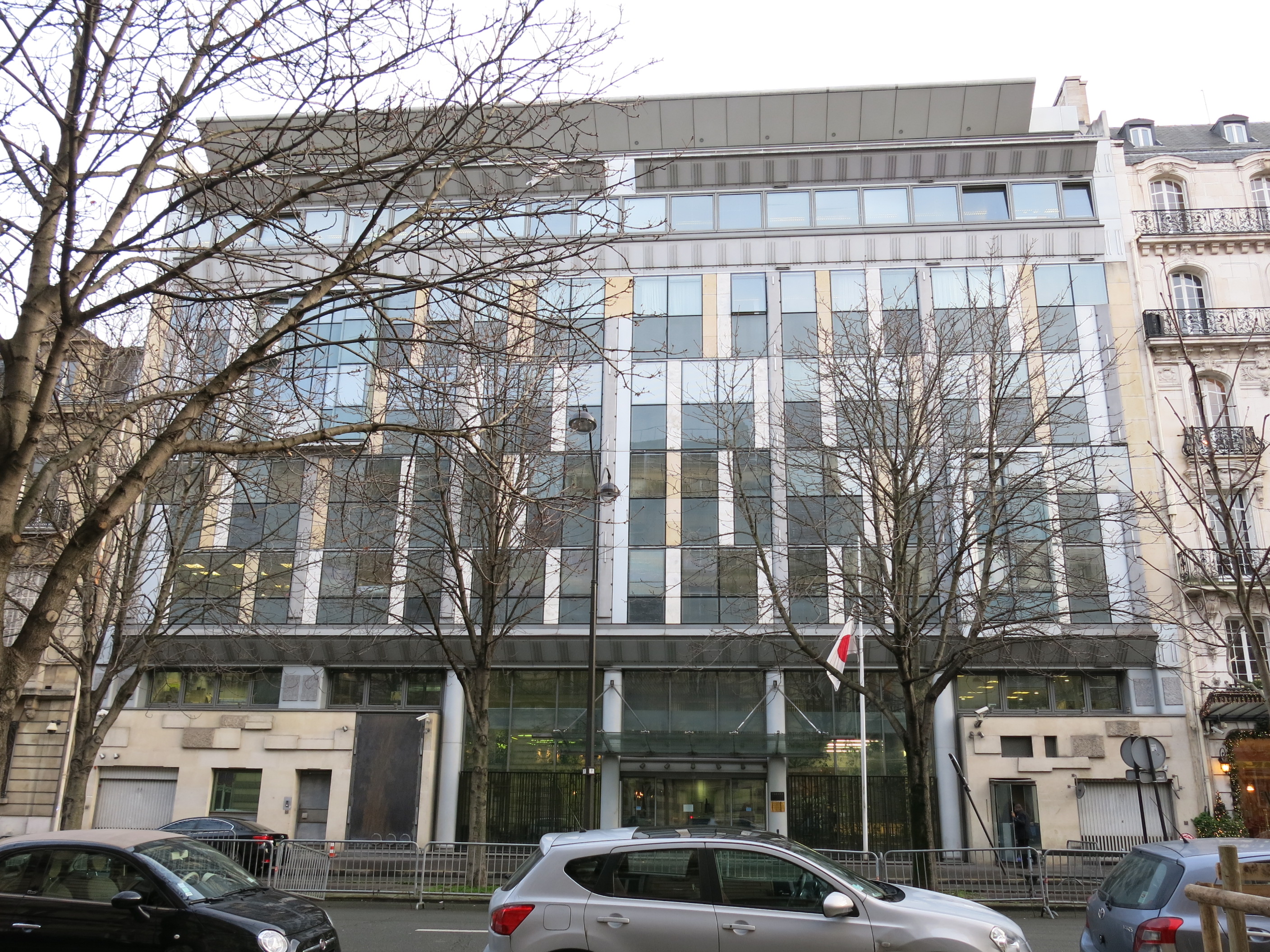
Embassy of Japan in Paris

== See also ==
- Foreign cemeteries in Japan
- Foreign relations of France
- Foreign relations of Japan
- French people in Japan
- Japanese people in France
- France–Asia relations
- Japonism
- Manga outside Japan#France and Manfra
- o-yatoi gaikokujin - foreign employees in Meiji era Japan
- Paris syndrome
