= Tōma Jūchin =

Japanese samurai; bureaucrat of Ryukyu

Tōma Pekumi Jūchin (当間 親雲上 重陳; 4 February 1591 – 16 May 1676) was a Japanese samurai of Satsuma Domain during Edo period, later became a bureaucrat of Ryukyu Kingdom.

Tōma Jūchin was born to a Japanese clan, Ijichi-shi (伊地知氏) of Ōsumi Province, and was given the name Ijichi Tarōuemon (伊地知 太郎右衛門). He was a descendant Hatakeyama Shigetada.

In his early years, he was appointed as Yamato yokome (大和横目, "supervisor of Japan") and sent to Ryukyu. Later, he became a bureaucrat of Ryukyu in 1634, started to wear Ryukyuan clothes, and started to use Japanese style name (大和名, Yamatona) "Tōma Jūchin" and Chinese style name (唐名, Karana) "Hei Keishō" (平 啓祥).

After Satsuma's invasion of Ryukyu in 1609, Ryukyu were getting poorer and poorer. Ryukyu had to borrowed money from Satsuma, but the debt was getting heavier and heavier and Ryukyu was unable to pay off it. Tōma Jūchin established government monopoly system of muscovado and turmeric in 1645, which alleviated the intense economic difficulties faced by the kingdom successfully. He also minted Hatome-sen (鳩目銭, "pigeon-eye coins") in 1656.
