= Shibata Takenaka =

Japanese emissary (1823–1877) known for visiting France

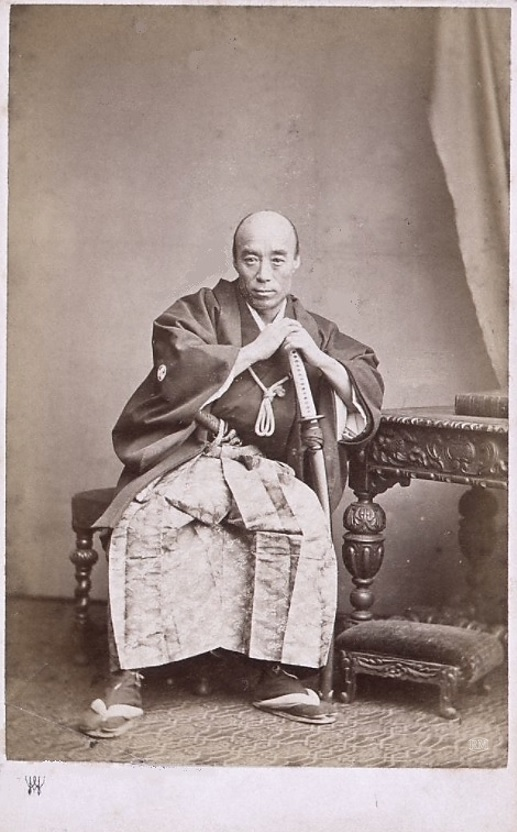
Shinata Sadataro Takenaka in London (1865)

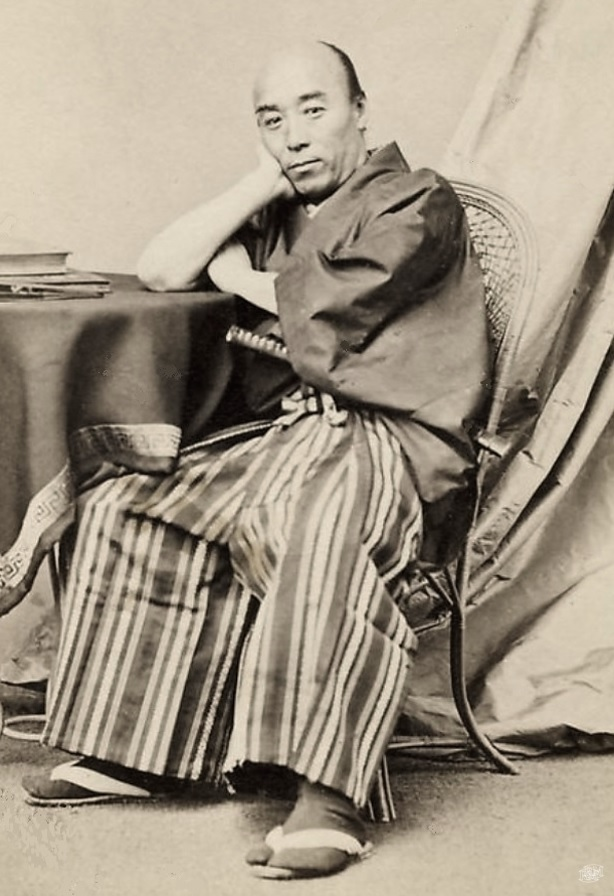
Shibata in Paris (1862)

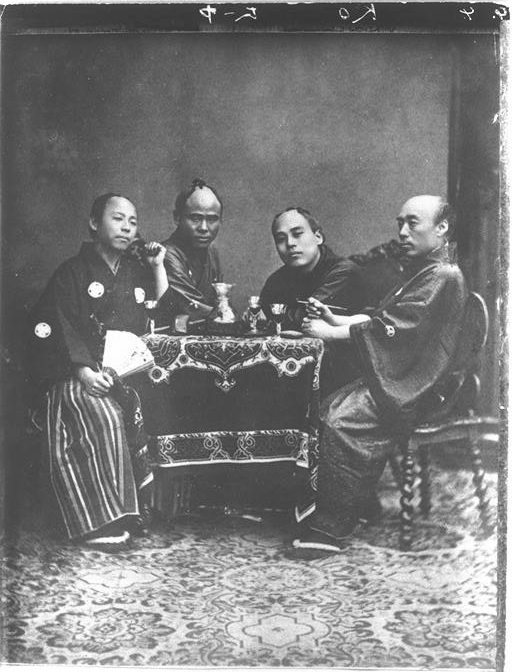
Shibata Takenaka sits on the right.

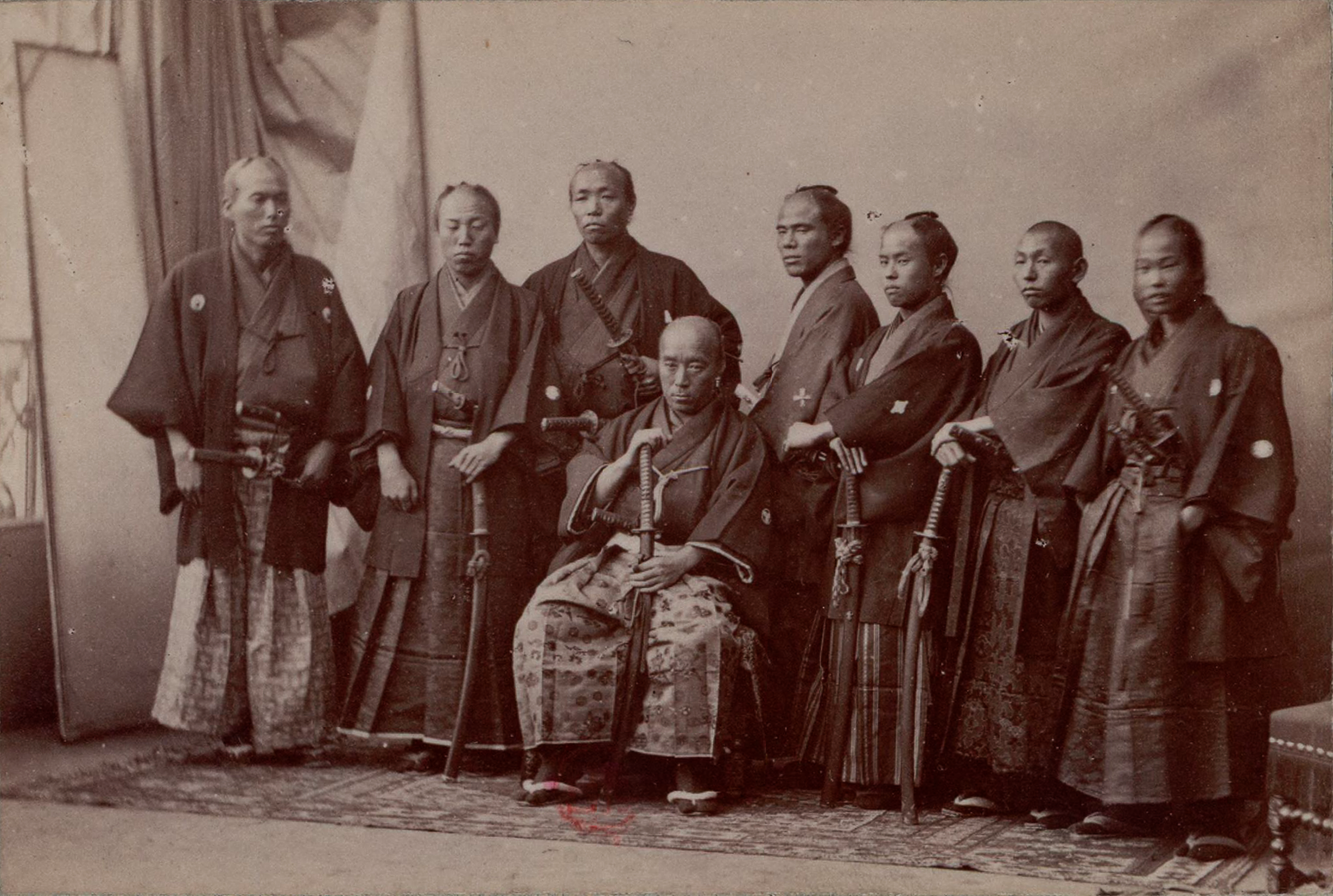
First Japanese Embassy to Europe

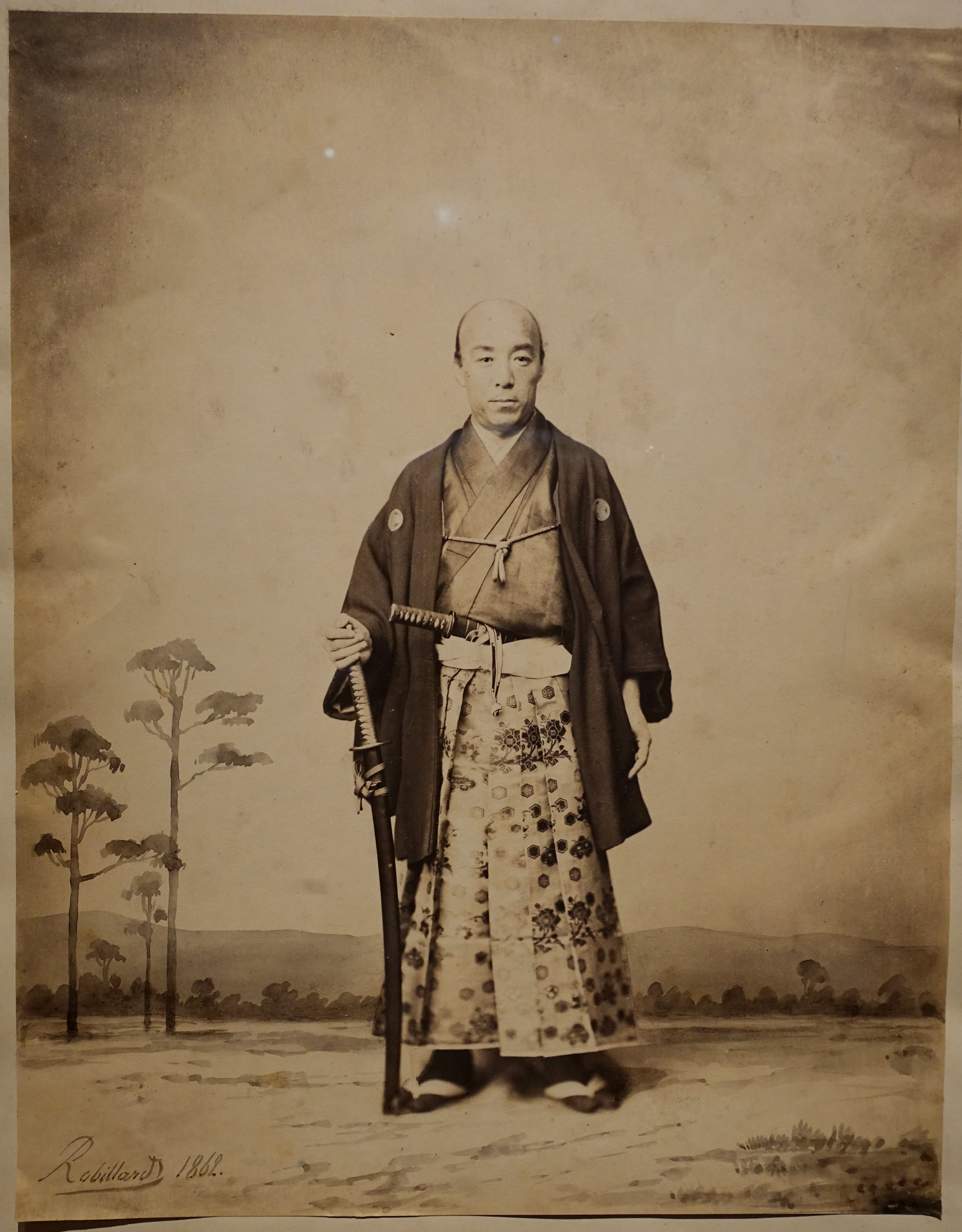
Shibata in Paris (1862)

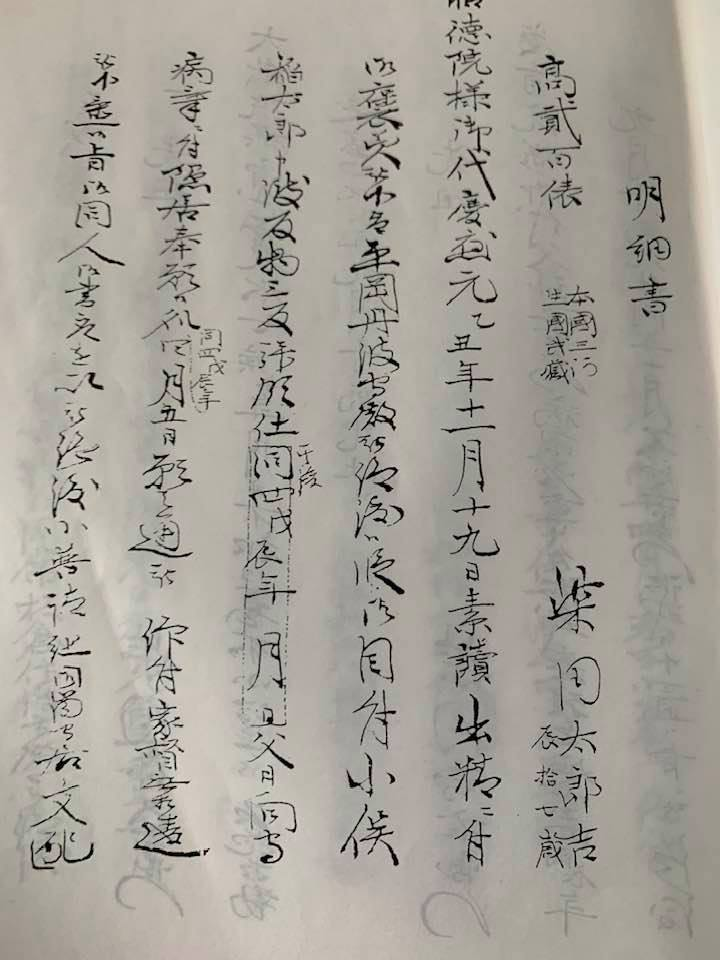
Family Document submitted to the shogunate by Shibata Taro

Shibata Takenaka (柴田 剛中; February 27, 1823 – August 24, 1877) was an emissary for Japan who visited France in 1865 to help prepare for the construction of the Yokosuka arsenal with French support. Also known as Shibata Sadataro (柴田 貞太郎) as well as "Shadow" because of his reconnaissance work.

== Life ==
Takenaka was born in the district of Koishikawa in Edo, the first son of Shibata Junzo Yoshimichi, a Metsuke samurai of the Tokugawa shogunate. His father died when he was 10, and he was appointed to Kobushin in 1833. In the same year, he was awarded for academic excellence. He became Metsuke in 1842.

- Awarded for his excellence in martial arts and the result in Gakumon Ginmi Examination (学問吟味) by the Tokugawa Shogunate in 1843.
- Awarded for his commitment in the refurbishment of Honmaru in Edo Castle in 1844.
- Awarded for the excellence in the Gakumon Ginmi Examination again by the shogunate in 1846.
- Awarded for his excellence in martial arts in the competition held by Wakadoshiyori (junior elders) of the shogunate in 1848.
- Awarded for his work in the refurbishments of the mausoleum located behind Zōjō-ji temple. He was awarded over 20 times in the same year for other efforts.

He was transferred to work in the Hyohjosho (評定所)(supreme court) in 1853. Together with his father, Shibata Junzo, Shibata Takenaka and his younger brother Nagamochi Kohjiro distinguished themselves in academics and in martial arts.

In 1858 Shibata became chief of staff in the gaikoku bugyo (foreign affairs department). He successfully negotiated matters regarding the opening of the port of Yokohama. He also assumed a leading position in negotiations with the delegations from the United States and Europe. Nagamochi Kohjiro was transferred to work in Nagasaki Bugyohsho (Nagasaki Magistrate's office) to help Shibata with his work.

His first visit to Europe was in 1862 as one of the principal members of the First Japanese Embassy to Europe. His nephew Nagamochi Goroji accompanied Shibata to Europe as his retainer.

During the 1862 mission, Shibata Sadataro Takenaka was chief of staff and first secretary. In fact, Shibata was one of the heads of the mission and participated directly in the negotiations, but he did not express himself, he was there as an observer, he listened and took notes. On his return to Japan, he was to report on the progress of the mission and the behaviors of the negotiators. In fact, he was the key person for intelligence gathering in Europe. The newspapers of the time nicknamed him "the shadow".

In 1863, he became gaikoku bugyo (commissioner of foreign affairs). His first assignment was to go to Hakodate to negotiate with the Russian consul general Iosif Antonovich Goskevich regarding the opening of Japanese ports.

In 1865, the Shibata Mission was dispatched to Europe. Shibata was stationed in Paris for a year and requested on behalf of the Tokugawa shogunate that both the United Kingdom and France send a military mission to Japan for training in Western warfare. The UK declined, but the French accepted. This led to the first French military mission to Japan from 1867 to 1868, which Shibata organized.

He was put in charge of the opening of the port of Kobe, and oversaw the construction of piers, residential areas for foreigners, and Tokugawa-do (Tokugawa Road). In 1868, he declared the port of Kobe open to the world in front of foreign delegations.

After the Meiji Restoration, he declined an offer from the Meiji Government to work for them. After his retirement, whenever the Meiji Government requested his advice, he answered them sincerely.

=== Ancestral background ===
The ancestor of the Shibatas was an Igamono Shinobisamurai, Shibata Suwo. In 1582 by the request of Hattori Hanzo, Shibata Suwo with his relative Nagamochi Tokuzo escorted Tokugawa Ieyasu in the Shinkun Iga Passing after Honnoji Incident and both were officially taken in to serve the Tokugawa. They moved to Edo in 1590 following Tokugawa Ieyasu. They became Iga Dohshin Hiroshikiban (Igamono police to serve in the shogun's private quarters in Edo Castle while engaging in shinobi missions from time to time).

Under the 10th shogun, Shibata Jinshiro was transferred to work in the shogunate's Gakumonsho (shogunate university). Under the 11th shogun, Shibata Junzo became Metsuke.

After the Iga Passing Incident in 1592, the Shibatas and the Nagamochis kept tight-knit as one clan. By the Bakumatsu period they also formed strong relations with the Oniwaban families through marriages.

== See also ==
- Gaikoku bugyō
- French–Japanese relations
