= London Protocol (1862) =

Signed between Japan and United Kingdom

The London Protocol was concluded on 6 June 1862 between Japan and the United Kingdom at the conclusion of the First Japanese Embassy to Europe. It was signed on the British side by Foreign Secretary John Russell, 1st Earl Russell.

Under the protocol, the United Kingdom ceded some of its rights under the Anglo-Japanese Treaty of Amity and Commerce for a period of five years beginning 1 January 1863. In exchange, the Japanese government reiterated its responsibilities under that treaty to fully open the ports of Nagasaki, Hakodate and Kanagawa to foreign trade.
