= Narushima Ryūhoku =

Japanese author and scholar

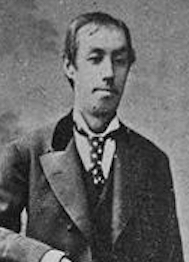

Narushima Ryūhoku (成島柳北, 1837–1884) was a Japanese writer and scholar born in Asakusa. His given name was Korehiro (惟弘). The Narushima family were okujusha (奥儒者), or Confucian tutors to the Tokugawa shōguns, who were also involved in editing the Tokugawa jikki (德川實紀) and other historical annals, including the Nochikagami (後鑑). Ryuhoku participated in these editing projects as a young man.

== From tutoring shōguns to satire ==
He served as tutor to the shoguns Tokugawa Iesada and Iemochi but was, according to some theories, dismissed because he wrote a poem critical of the fact that his recommendations had not been adopted. At that time he took up Western studies. During the Keiō period (1866–68) he served in the shogun's cavalry and also briefly as Minister of Foreign Affairs. After the Meiji Restoration, he took up a position with the Higashi Honganji Temple, which sponsored a tour for him and four other men to Europe and the United States in 1872–73.

Soon after his return to Japan, Ryuhoku became the editor of the Chōya Shinbun (朝野新聞), and also founded the literary journal Kagetsu shinshi (花月新誌). In 1876, he was imprisoned for four months when he ran afoul of the Meiji government's press laws. After his release, he published an essay entitled "Gokunaibanashi" (ごく内ばなし). He had a very critical attitude towards the great functionaries of Satsuma and Chōshū, who although vassals of the former shogunate, were then acting pretentiously in their new roles as leaders of the Meiji government. In protest, he declared that "I will become a useless person between natures," and started to write satire.

Ryuhoku's most famous work is Ryūkyō Shinshi (柳橋新誌), or "New Chronicles of Yanagibashi", the first volume of which he began writing in 1859, and the second volume of which he began writing in 1871. The work concerns the world of the pleasure quarters of Yanagibashi, humorously depicting cultural shifts from the Edo period to the Meiji period. Kōsei Nichijō (航西日乗), or "Diary of a Journey to the West", is the travelogue he wrote during his journey to Europe and the United States in 1872–73.

== See also ==
- Gaikoku bugyō – Narushima was one
