= Hiroatsu Takata =

Japanese artist

Takata Hiroatsu
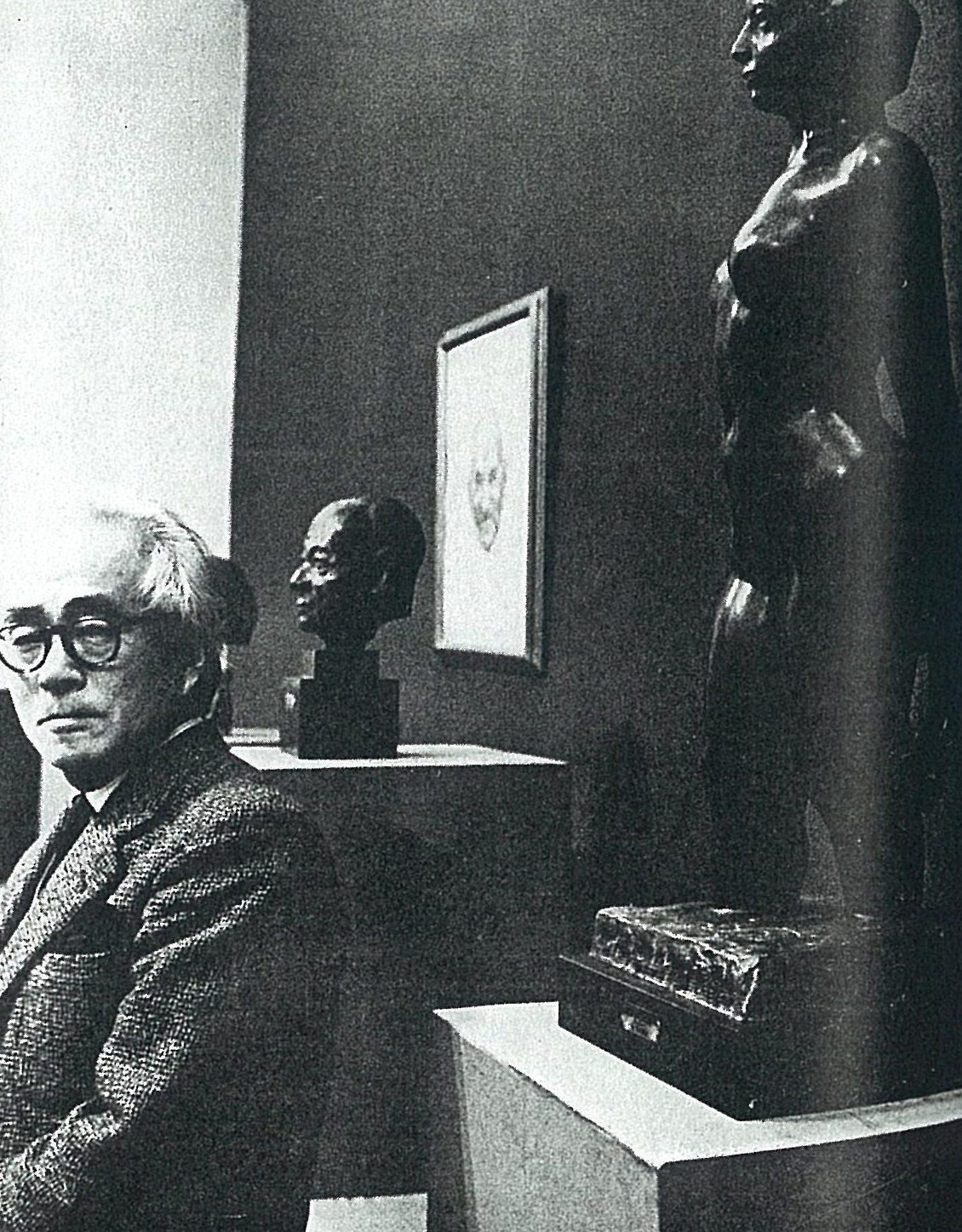
- Takata Hiroatsu in 1962
- Born: August 19, 1900; Kashima District, Ishikawa, Japan
- Died: June 17, 1987 (aged 86)
- Known for: Sculptor

Hiroatsu Takata (高田博厚, Takata Hiroatsu; August 19, 1900 – June 17, 1987) was a Japanese sculptor and essayist, who lived for many years in Paris. He had a wide circle of friends in the literary world, and his daughter was once married to Ryūichi Tamura.

== Biography ==
Takata was born in Kashima District, Ishikawa, in what is now part of the city of Nanao, where his father was a lawyer. The family relocated to Fukui in 1903. Takata showed an interest in the arts from middle school, and at the age of 18 moved to Tokyo, where he met Takamura Koun, Kishida Ryusei, Shishi Bunroku, Ozaki Kihachi, Motokichi Takahashi, Shigeo Iwanami and others. In 1919, he enrolled in the Tokyo University of Foreign Studies intending to study the Italian language, but dropped out in 1921. It was around this time that his attention turned towards sculpture.

In 1922, Takata completed a translation of Ascanio Condivi’s Biography of Michaelangelo, and had it published by Iwanami Shoten. In 1925, he moved to a Communist commune outside of Tokyo, where he lived for three years raising goats. With the government suppression of Communists and known Communist sympathizers in 1928 under the Peace Preservation Laws, he was briefly arrested. It was also around this time that he made an acquaintance with Mushanokoji Saneatsu, Tetsuzō Tanikawa, Chūya Nakahara, Hideo Kobayashi, Shōhei Ōoka, Shigeharu Nakano, and Ryuzaburo Umehara.

In 1931, leaving his wife and four child behind, Takata moved to Paris, France, where he studied the sculptures of Auguste Rodin, Aristide Maillol, and Antoine Bourdelle, exchanged correspondence with Romain Rolland, and even made a sketch of Mahatma Gandhi. Takata refused to return to Japan as scheduled, and remained in Paris for the next 27 years. His circle of acquaintances included Paul Signac, Émile Chartier, Charles Vildrac, Georges Duhamel, Jules Romains, Georges Rouault, and Jean Cocteau and partially supported himself by sending their works to Japan.

In 1937, Takata started a mimeographed newsletter for Japanese expatriates in Paris. He also started the Paris Japanese Artists Association. After the German invasion of France in 1940, he was hired by the Mainichi Shimbun as a special correspondent.

In 1944, by order of Japanese ambassador to Germany, Hiroshi Oshima, along with all other Japanese resident in Paris, he was evacuated to Berlin to escape the advancing Allied armies. At the fall of Berlin, he was captured by the Soviet Union, and held in a prisoner of war camp for 18 months, until he was repatriated back to Japan in late 1946.

From 1948 to 1957, Takata served as the official Japanese representative to the Cannes Film Festival, returning to France to love. From 1949, he was also a correspondent for the Yomiuri Shimbun.

From autumn 1957, Takata returned to live in Tokyo, and served as chairman of the Japan PEN International, and on the board of the Japan Artists Association, and also taught at the Tokyo University of the Arts. He retired in 1966, and moved to Inamuragasaki, Kamakura in 1967, but returned again to visit Paris from 1967-1970. Takata died in 1987.
