= Takenouchi Yasunori =

Japanese samurai (1806–1867)

- Born: 1806
- Died: March 3, 1867 (aged 60–61)
- Military career
- Era: Bakumatsu

Takenouchi Yasunori (1806 - March 3, 1867) was a Japanese Samurai Lord during Bakumatsu period.

Takenouchi was governor of Shimotsuke Province, and in 1862 became the head of the Japanese mission to Europe. In 1864, he retired from active government service.
