= First Japanese Embassy to Europe (1862) =

Diplomatic mission from Japan to Europe

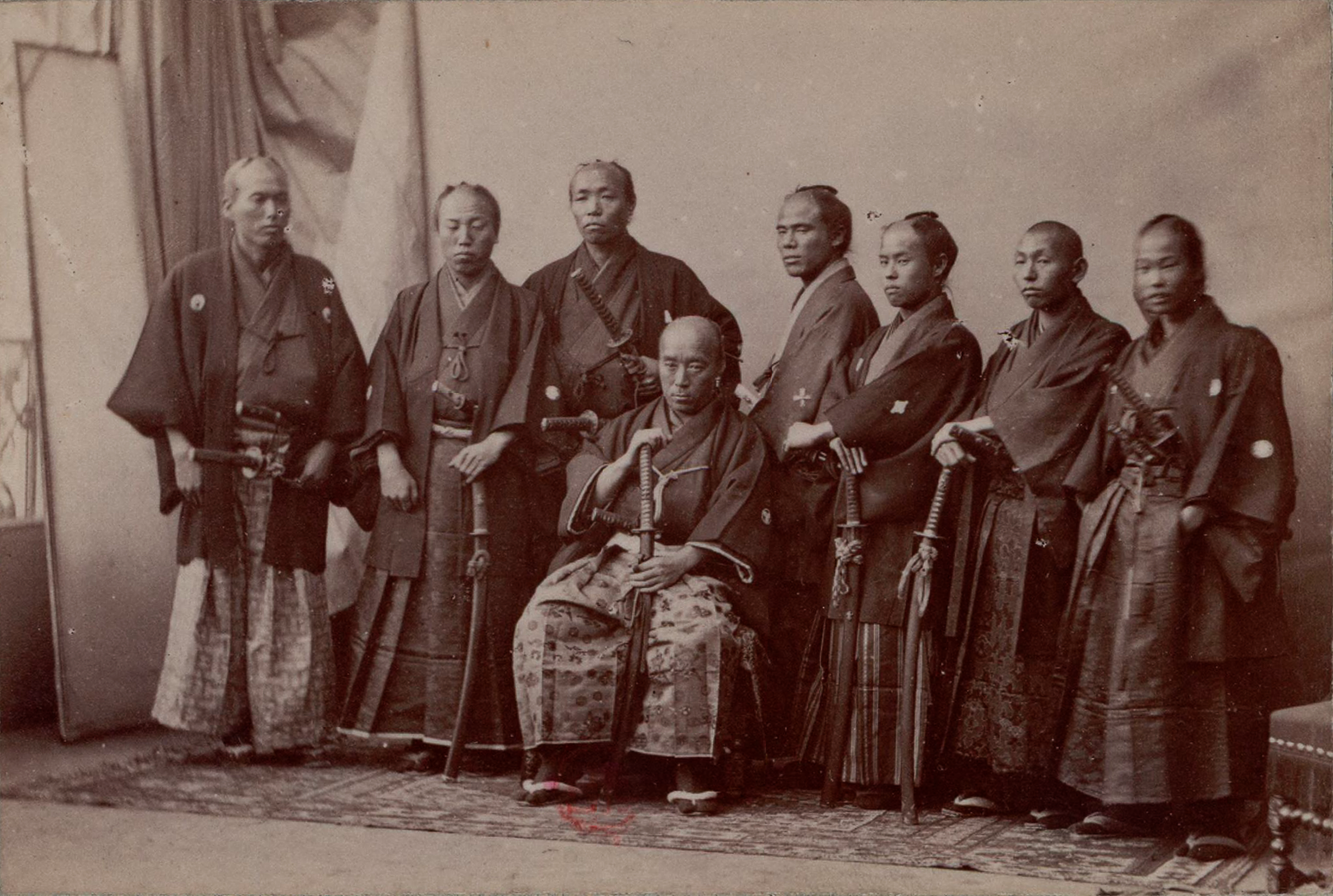
Members of the First Japanese Embassy to Europe, in 1862, around Shibata Sadataro, head of the mission staff (seated).

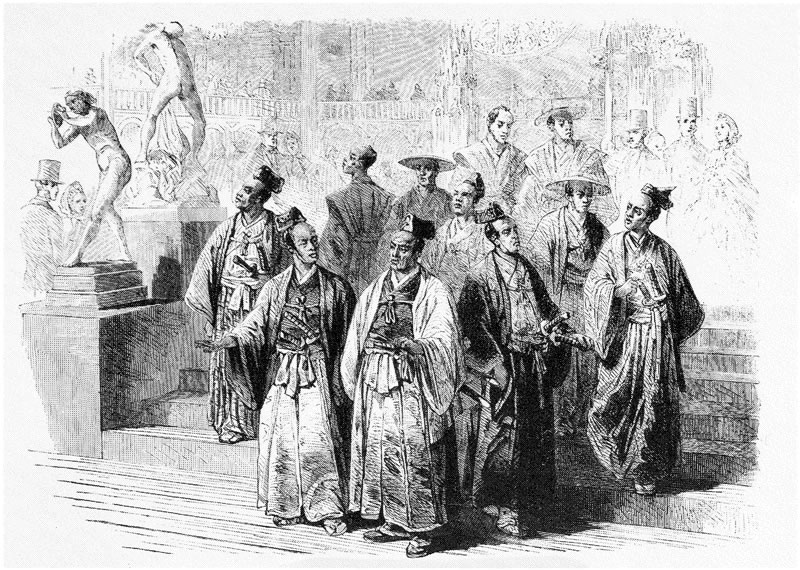
The members of the Japanese Embassy visiting the 1862 International Exhibition in London, from the Illustrated London News.

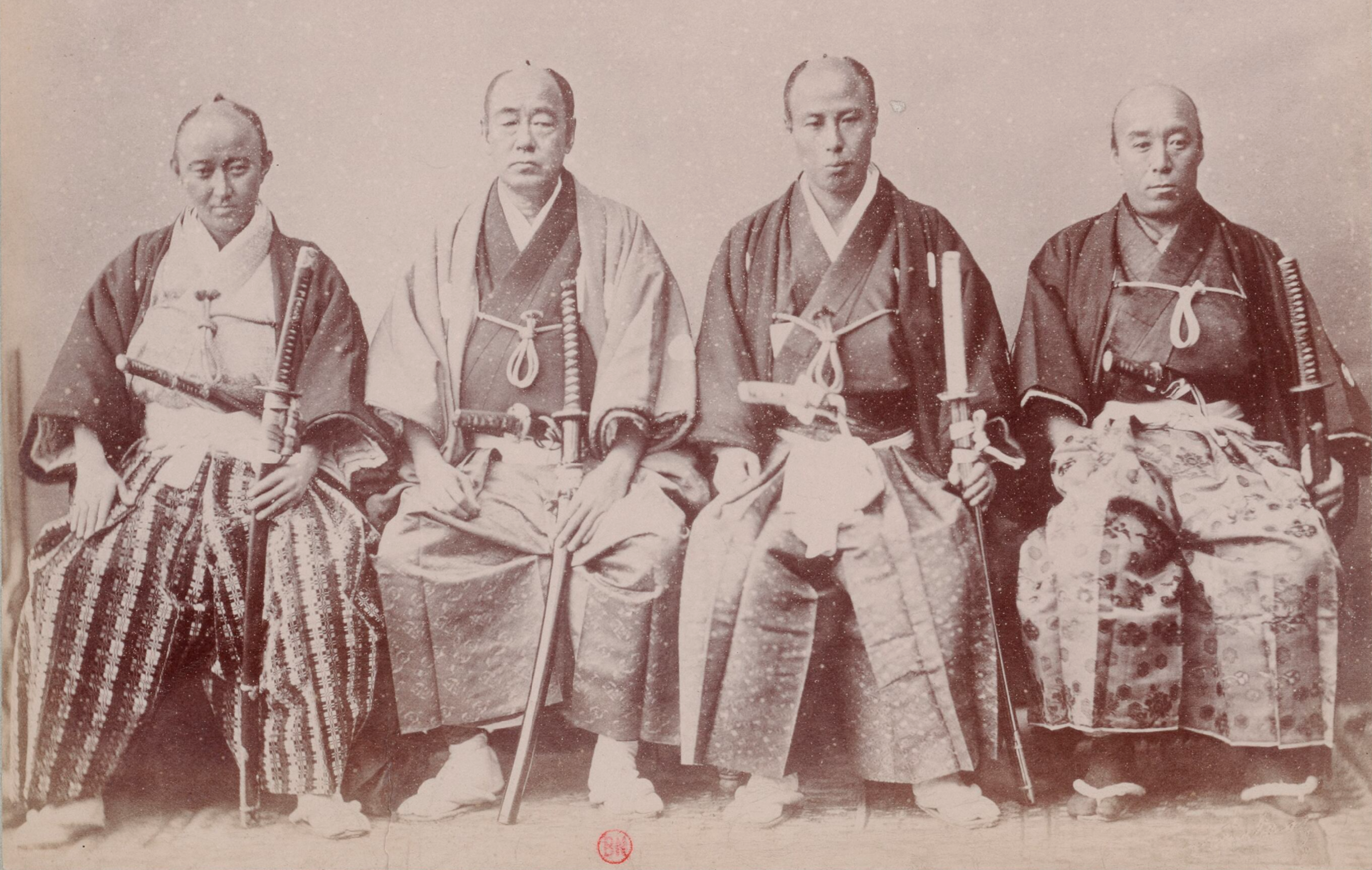
Senior members of the embassy.

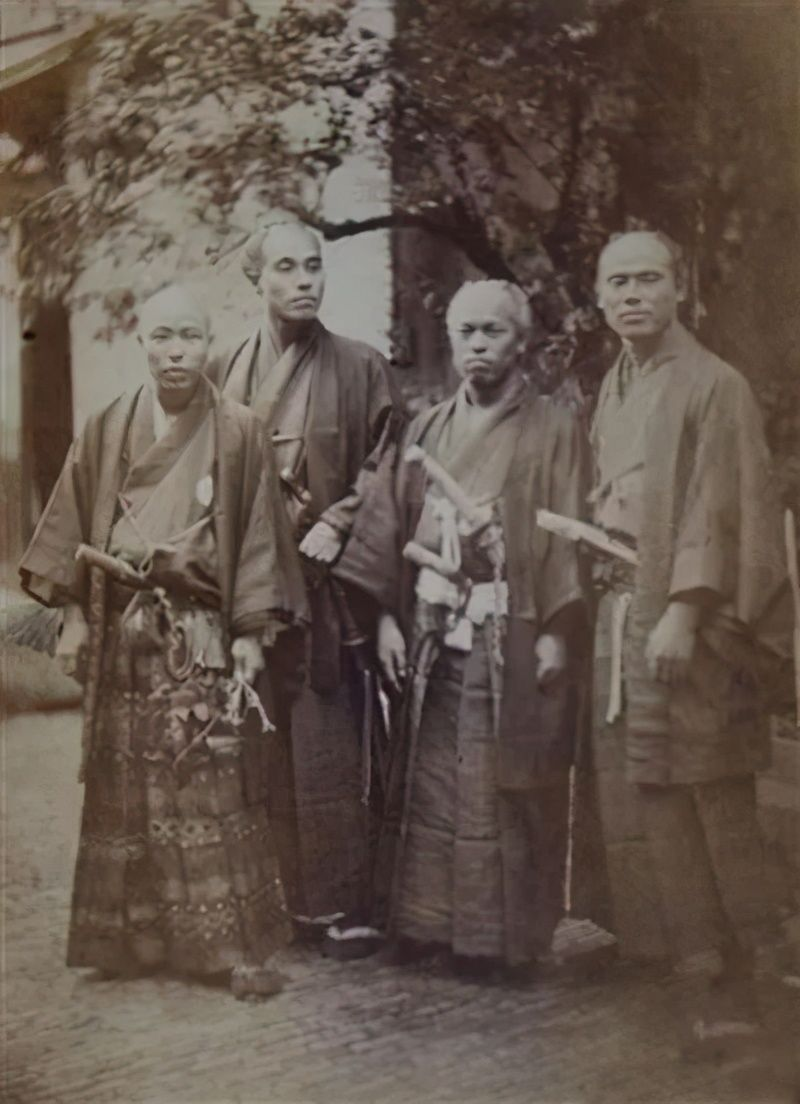
Members of the embassy in Utrecht. The second is Fukuzawa Yukichi from the left.

The First Japanese Embassy to Europe (Japanese:第1回遣欧使節, also 開市開港延期交渉使節団) was sent to Europe by the Tokugawa shogunate in 1862. The head of the mission was Takenouchi Yasunori, governor of Shimotsuke Province (present-day Tochigi Prefecture). The head of the mission staff was Shibata Takenaka Sadataro. Fukuzawa Yukichi was a member of the mission, acting as one of the two translators. The mission numbered 40 men.

Despite the name, it is more accurately the third Japanese embassy to Europe, being preceded by the Tenshō embassy (1582–1590) and the expedition led by Hasekura Tsunenaga between 1613 and 1620.

== Itinerary ==
Leaving Shinagawa, Tokyo on 21 January 1862, the mission was sent in order to learn about Western civilization, ratify treaties, and delay the opening of cities and harbours to foreign trade. Negotiations were held in France, the United Kingdom of Great Britain and Ireland, the Netherlands, Prussia, Russia, and finally Portugal. The mission eventually returned to Tokyo on 30 January 1863.

The members of the mission were extensively photographed by Nadar.

In London, the Mission visited the 1862 World Fair. Five years later, Japan would formally participate to the 1867 World Fair in Paris.

The mission included the signing of the London Protocol on 6 June 1862, which recognized that Japan needed time to "overcome the opposition now existing" (meaning the anti-foreign sentiment shared by the population and the Imperial Court), and accepted the postponement of the opening of Osaka, Hyogo, Edo, and Niigata by five years, to 1 January 1868.

== See also ==
- Japanese Embassy to the United States (1860)
- Second Japanese Embassy to Europe (1863)
- Iwakura Mission
- France–Japan relations (19th century)

== Bibliography ==
- Shin Jinbutsu Ōrai-sha, eds.: Ikokujin no Mita Bakumatsu–Meiji Japan, Aizō-ban (異国人の見た幕末・明治JAPAN 愛蔵版: Bakumatsu and Meiji Japan in the Eyes of Foreigners, Enthusiasts’ Edition). Tokyo, 2005. ISBN 4-404-03252-8 (ISBN ), ISBN 978-4-404-03252-2 (ISBN ) (in Japanese)
- Medzini, Meron French Policy in Japan Harvard University Press 1971, ISBN 0-674-32230-4
