= Metsuke =

Censors or the inspectors of Tokugawa shogunate

Metsuke (目付) were the censors or the inspectors of Tokugawa shogunate. They were bakufu officials ranking somewhat lower than the bugyō. The metsuke were charged with the special duty of detecting and investigating instances of maladministration, corruption or disaffection anywhere in Japan, and particularly amongst the populace having status below the daimyō.

== Intelligence gathering ==
The shogunate recognized the need for some kind of internal intelligence-gathering apparatus and for some degree of covert espionage within its own ranks. It could be said that the metsuke functioned as the Shogun's intelligence agency or as internal spies, reporting to the officials in Edo on events and situations across the country.

The metsuke were charged with focusing on those ranking below daimyō-status; and their counterparts, the ōmetsuke, were responsible for supervising the activities of officials and members of the daimyō (feudal lords).

Although similarly engaged, the reporting protocols of the metsuke and ōmetsuke differed. The metsuke reported to wakadoshiyori who ranked just below the rōjū. The ōmetsuke reported directly to the four or five rōjū at the top of the shogunate bureaucracy. By design, the intelligence-gathering activities of the metsuke was intended to complement those of the ōmetsuke even though there was no official reporting relationship between the two somewhat independent groups.

There were at any given time as many as twenty-four metsuke.

== Ōmetsuke ==
The Ōmetsuke had the role of an inspector who monitored the daimyo, the high family, and the imperial court, and protected the shogunate from these rebellions. On December 17, 1632, in the ninth year of Kanei, four people were appointed: Akiyama Masashige, Mizuno Morinobu, Yagyu Munenori, and Inoue Masashige. Also, at the beginning of installation, it was called Sometsuki He was elected from among the banners, and was considered to be the highest rank in the positions of the bannermen, equivalent to the members of the Imperial Concubine, the Imperial Guard, and the head of the Daiban. And since he was a bannerman and monitored the Manseki class (daimyo), during his tenure, he was given the rank of manseki-class rokutaka on a par with the daimyo, and was ordained to the official rank of "○○ guard".

In the middle of the Edo period, the color of the messenger (the role of conveying the orders of the shogunate to the daimyo of the whole country) and the ceremonial officer in the palace (Edo Castle) became darker than the color of the conventional inspector, and it came to be regarded as an honorary or quiet position, and the hatamoto, who served as a town magistrate or account magistrate, became a position appointed in old age. In addition, he also served in five roles such as a magistrate on the road, a sōmon reform, and a gun reform.

The official height was 3000 koku, and in the shogunate, it was under the jurisdiction of the old man In the year following the inauguration of the service fee system in the 5th year of Kanbun (1665), the official salary was set at 1,000 bales. When the service fee system was abolished in the second year of Tenwa (1682), the official fee was added to the Chigyo High School as it was. In the 5th year of Genroku (1692), the service fee system was reinstated, and under the system at that time, the official height of the daimetsuke was set at 3,000 koku, and 700 bales were paid only to those who had a job height of 3,000 koku or less. The capacity is indefinite, 3 to 2 people in the Iemitsu-Ietsuna period, 4 to 3 people in the Tsunayoshi-Ieshige period, and 5 to 4 people in the Ieji-Iekei period, and the number of people installed also changed due to the new construction of kake. Ōmetsuke, who also served as a magistrate along the way, was the first of the ranks, and was in a position to represent the shogun, as was the case with the Kyoto shojidai and Osaka jodai.

== Ad hoc evolution ==
The bureaucracy of the Tokugawa shogunate expanded on an ad hoc basis, responding to perceived needs and changing circumstances. Sometimes one or more of the metsuke or ōmetsuke would have been selected to address a specific or even a unique problem. For example, Arao Norimasa in the period from 1852 through 1854 was charged with special duties as kaibo-gakari-metsuke.

The prefix kaibō-gakari meaning "in charge of maritime defense" was used with the titles of some bakufu officials after 1845. This term was used to designate those who bore a special responsibility for overseeing coastal waters, and by implication, for dealing with matters involving foreigners. "Kaibō-gakari-metsuke" later came to be superseded by the term gaikoku-gakari. These developments preceded the Gaikoku bugyō system which began just prior to the negotiations which resulted in the Harris Treaty. First appointed in August 1858, the gaikoku-bugyō were bakufu officials who were charged with advising the government on foreign affairs and who were tasked with conducting negotiations with foreign diplomats both in Japan and abroad.

== In popular culture ==
The post of metsuke was not immune to corruption, and sometimes the conduct of these officials could be affected by bribes. For example, the televised jidaigeki episodes of Abarenbō Shōgun are rife with petty corruption, including a broad range of officials across the span of television seasons.

Metsuke also appear as persecutors of Japanese Christians in the film Silence (2016).

In the video game Total War: Shogun 2, metsuke are agents who serve as secret policemen and act as the counterparts to ninjas, whose role is to discover and arrest enemy operatives.

== List of metsuke ==
- Matsudaira Chikano (1841–1844)
- Ido Staohiro (1842–1845)
- Arao Narimasa (1852–1854)
- Nagai Naomune (1853–1858)
- Iwase Tadanari (1854–1858)
- Oguri Tadamasa (1859–1860)
- Ikeda Nagaoki (1862–1863, 1863)
- Kawada Hiroshi (1864)
- Kurimoto Sebei (1864–1865)

== See also ==
- Bugyō
