= Felice A. Beato =

Italian-British photography duo

Felice A. Beato and Felice Antonio Beato are collective signatures used by the brothers Felice Beato and Antonio Beato, who were both pioneering photographers in the 19th century. They were noted for their depictions of everyday life in Orient.

== Description ==
The brothers sometimes worked together, signing their photographs collectively. Consequently, it was long assumed that such photographs were the work of one photographer who somehow managed to photograph at the same time in places as distant as Egypt and Japan. It was only in 1983 that the truth of the matter was revealed, in a paper by Italo Zannier. The confusion arising from the signatures continues to cause problems in identifying which of the two photographers was the creator of a given image. Both signatures may refer to either or both photographers.

The brothers were active in the Middle East and Asia from the early 1850s through to the early 20th century and were among the first photographers to take photographs of the Orient. At that time, tourist travel to Middle East created strong demand for photographs as souvenirs. The Beato brothers were part of a group of early photographers who made their way to the East to capitalise on this demand. These pioneering photographers included Frenchmen, Félix Bonfils (1831–1885); Gustave Le Gray (1820–1884) and Hippolyte Arnoux, brothers Henri and Emile Bechard and the Greek Zangaki brothers, many of whom were in Egypt at the same time and entered into both formal and informal working partnerships. These early photographers, including the Beato Brothers, were among the first commercial photographers to produce images on a large scale in the Middle East.

From time to time, the brothers split up and joined with other pioneering photographers for specific projects. In 1855, one of the brothers, Felice, teamed up with the pair's brother-in-law, James Robertson and travelled to the Crimea where they assumed responsibility for war photography. and made their reputation by depicting the destruction and death associated with the conflict. Their Crimean images dramatically changed the way that war was reported and depicted.

In July 1858 Antonio joined Felice in Calcutta. Felice had been in India since the beginning of the year photographing the aftermath of the Indian Rebellion of 1857, but Antonio left India the following year for health reasons, and headed for Malta by way of Suez. By the early 1860, Antonio was in Cairo where he opened a photographic studio and went into partnership with the French photographer, Hippolyte Arnoux. By 1863 Felice was living and working in Japan.

The Beato brothers' images of Egypt were distinctly different to those of other pioneering photographers working in the Middle East and Asia. Whereas most photographers focussed on the grandeur of monuments and architecture, the Beatos concentrated on scenes of everyday life.

== See also ==
- History of photography
- List of Orientalist artists
- Orientalism

== General references ==
- Antonio e Felice Beato, Venice, Ikona Photo Gallery, 1983
- Bennett, Terry, Early Japanese Images, Rutland, Vermont, Charles E. Tuttle Company, 1996
