= Ikeda Nagaoki =

Governor in Bitchū Province, Tokugawa Shogunate

- 池田 長発
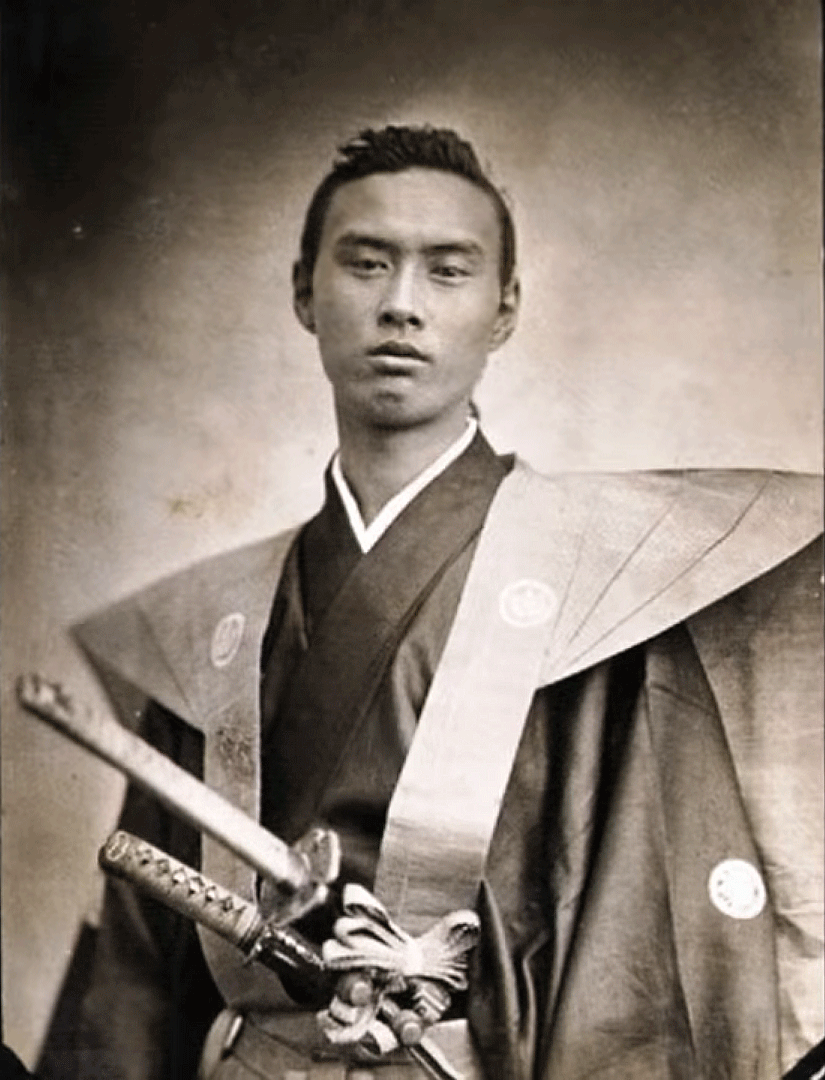
- Nagaoki in 1864
- Born: August 23, 1837; Ibara, Bitchū Province (Okayama Prefecture), Japan
- Died: September 12, 1879 (aged 42)
- Other name: Ikeda Chikugo no kami Nagaoki
- Years active: 1860s-1870s
- Era: Late Tokugawa shogunate, Early Meiji era
- Known for: Leading the Second Japanese Embassy to Europe (Ikeda Mission), promoting Western technology and education in Japan, pioneering the Japanese wine industry

Ikeda Nagaoki (池田 長発; August 23, 1837 – September 12, 1879), formally "Ikeda Chikugo no kami Nagaoki", was the governor of small villages of Ibara, Bitchū Province (Okayama Prefecture), Japan, during the end of the Tokugawa shogunate.

He was, at 27, the head of the Second Japanese Embassy to Europe (Japanese:第2回遣欧使節), also called the Ikeda Mission, sent in 1863-1864 by the Tokugawa shogunate to negotiate the cancellation of the open-port status of Yokohama. The mission was sent following the 1863 "Order to expel barbarians" (攘夷実行の勅命) issued by Emperor Kōmei, and the Bombardment of Shimonoseki incidents, in a wish to again close the country to Western influence, and return to sakoku status.

Nagaoki left with a mission of 36 men on a French warship, stopped in Shanghai, India, and Cairo through the Suez Canal. His mission visited the pyramids, a feat which Antonio Beato photographed at the time. He finally arrived in Marseille and then Paris, where he met with Napoleon III and with Philipp Franz von Siebold. He stayed at the Grand Hotel in Paris.

The request to close Japanese harbours to Westerners was doomed as Yokohama was the key springboard for Western activity in Japan. The mission was a total failure. Nagaoki however was very impressed with the advancement of French civilization, and became very active in promoting the dispatch of embassies and students abroad, once he had returned to Japan. He was finally put under house arrest by the Bakufu.

Nagaoki brought many documents from France, related especially to physics, biology, manufacture, textiles and also fermentation technologies. He is considered as one of the fathers of the wine industry in Japan.

== See also ==
Wine Road of the Samurai
