= James Robertson (photographer) =

English photographer and engraver (1813–1888)

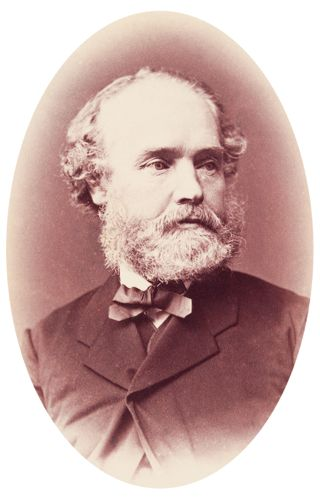
- James Roberton, photograph by the Abdullah Bros, c. 1875
- Born: 1813; Middlesex, England
- Died: April 1888 (aged 74–75); Yokohama, Japan
- Known for: Engraver, photographer and watercolourist
- Notable work: Photographs of the Crimean war
- Movement: Orientalist
- Spouse: Leonilda Maria Matilda Beato (m. 1855)

James Robertson (1813–1888) was an English gem and coin engraver who worked in the Mediterranean region, and who became a pioneering photographer working in the Crimea and possibly India. He is noted for his Orientalist photographs and for being one of the first war photographers.

== Life and career ==
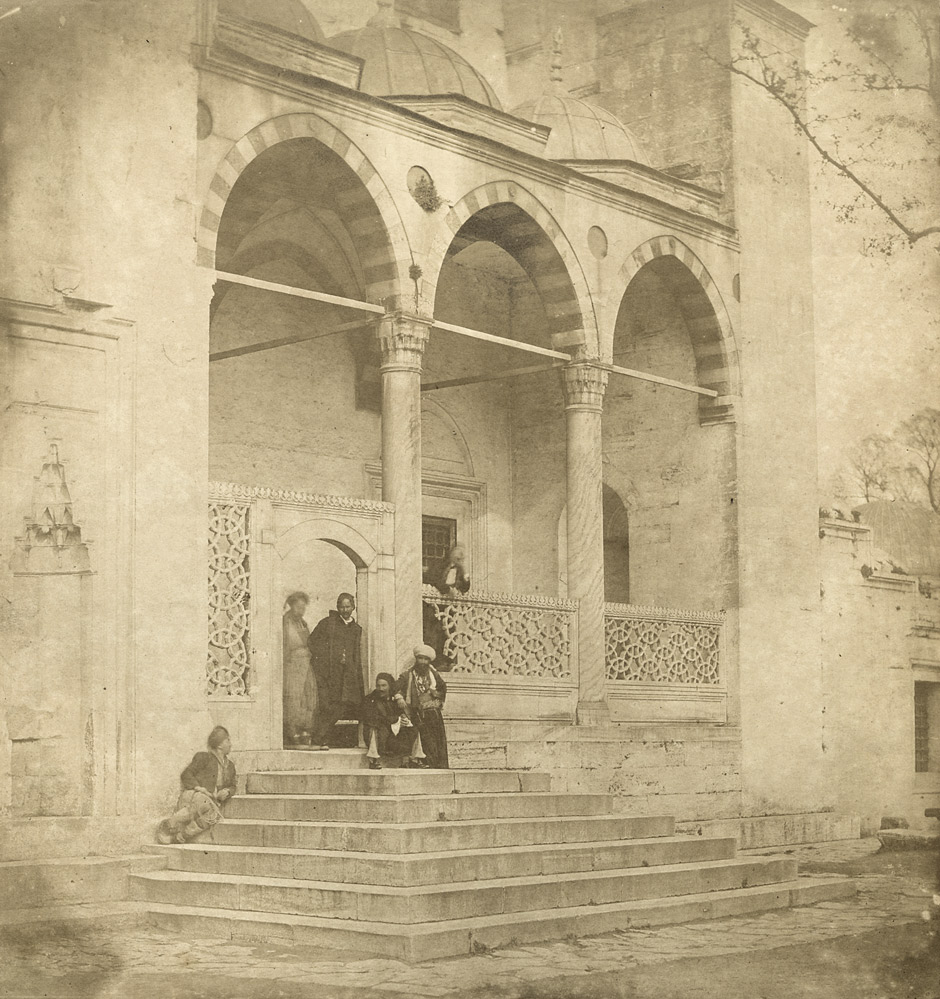
Süleymaniye Mosque in Constantinople, photograph by Robertson, 1853

Robertson was born in Middlesex in 1813. He trained as an engraver under Wyon (probably William Wyon). In 1841, he settled in Constantinople where he worked as an "engraver and die-stamper" at the Imperial Ottoman Mint. During this period, he appears to have become interested in photography.

By the 1850s, tourist travel to the Near East created strong demand for photographs as souvenirs. A small group of early photographers, mostly of French origin, made their way to Egypt and Constantinople to capitalise on this demand. These pioneering photographers included Félix Bonfils (1831-1885); Gustave Le Gray (1820-1884), brothers Henri and Emile Bechard; the British-Italian brothers, Antonio Beato (c. 1832–1906) and Felice Beato (1832–1909), and the Greek Zangaki brothers. Many of these photographers were in Egypt at the same time, and some, including Robertson, formed partnerships.

In 1853 Robertson began photographing with the British-Italian photographer Felice Beato and the two formed a partnership called Robertson & Beato either in that year or in 1854 when Robertson opened a photographic studio in Pera, Constantinople. Robertson and Beato were joined by Beato's brother, Antonio on photographic expeditions to Malta in 1854 or 1856 and to Greece and Jerusalem in 1857. A number of the firm's photographs produced in the 1850s are signed Robertson, Beato and Co. and it is believed that "and Co." refers to Antonio.

In late 1854 or early 1855 Robertson married the Beato brothers' sister, Leonilda Maria Matilda Beato. The couple had three daughters, Catherine Grace (born in 1856), Edith Marion Virginie (born in 1859) and Helen Beatrice (born in 1861).

In 1855 Robertson along with Felice Beato, Charles Langlois and Karl Baptiste van Szatmari travelled to Balaklava, Crimea where they photographed the closing stages of the Crimean War. (They had replaced the previous photographer, Roger Fenton.) They photographed the fall of Sevastopol in September 1855. Of all the photographs produced, at least 60 made by Robertson are the best known. It was Robertson's work in Crimea that would earn him the reputation as the world's "first war photographer."

In around 1857 both Robertson and Felice Beato went to Calcutta in India to photograph the aftermath of the Indian Rebellion. Robertson also produced photographs in Palestine, Syria, Malta, and Cairo with either or both of the Beato brothers.

In the late 1850s, Robertson produced a number of water-colours with popular Orientalist themes such as carpet-sellers and snake charmers. It is unclear whether he painted these, or overpainted photographs with a soft, water-colour wash.

In 1860, after Felice Beato left for China to photograph the Second Opium War and Antonio Beato went to Egypt, Robertson briefly teamed up with Charles Shepherd back in Constantinople. The firm of Robertson & Beato was dissolved in 1867, having produced images - including remarkable multiple-print panoramas - of Malta, Greece, Turkey, Damascus, Jerusalem, Egypt, the Crimea and India. Robertson possibly gave up photography in the 1860s; he returned to work as an engraver at the Imperial Ottoman Mint until his retirement in 1881. In that year he left for Yokohama, Japan, arriving in January 1882. He died there in April 1888.

== Gallery ==
Selected Orientalist photographs

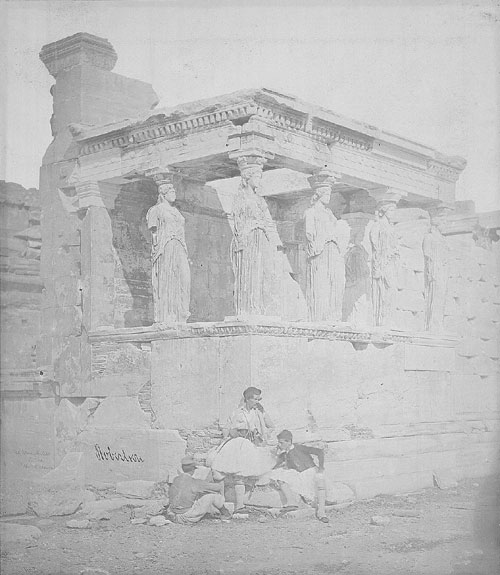
Erechtheum Acropolis, photograph, 1853

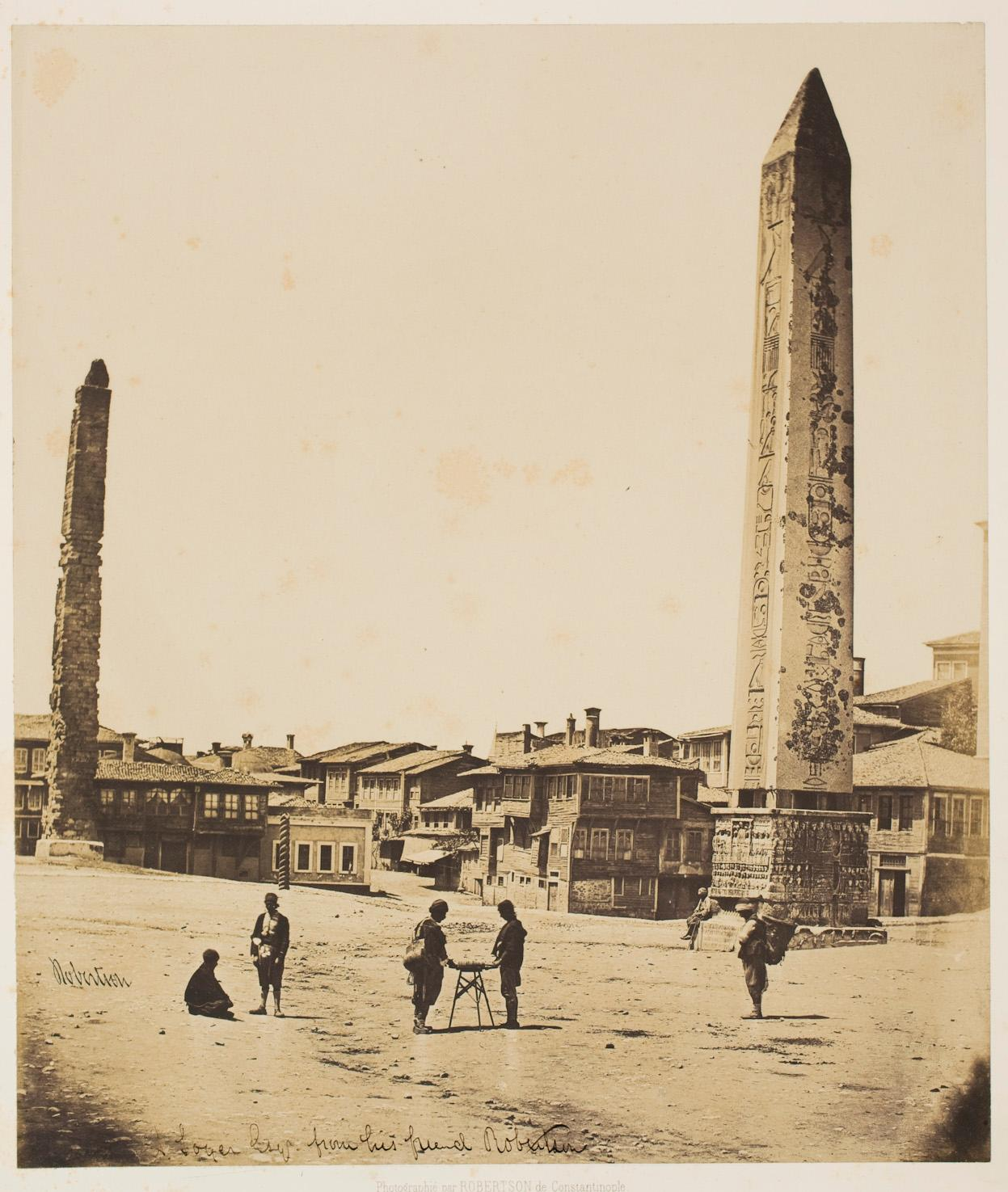
Obelisk of Theodosius in the Hippodrome of Constantinople, c. 1854

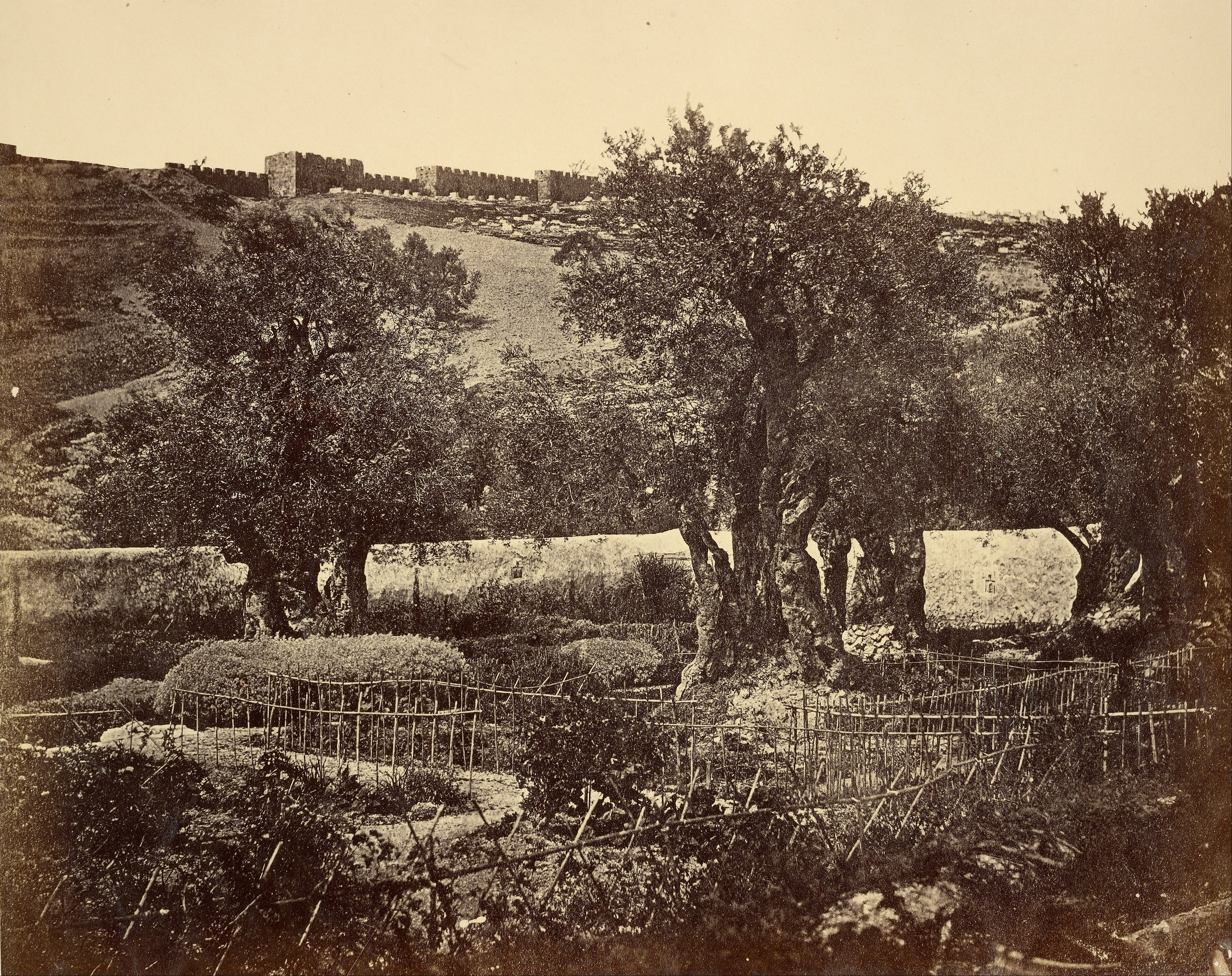
The Garden of Gethsemane, photograph, 1857

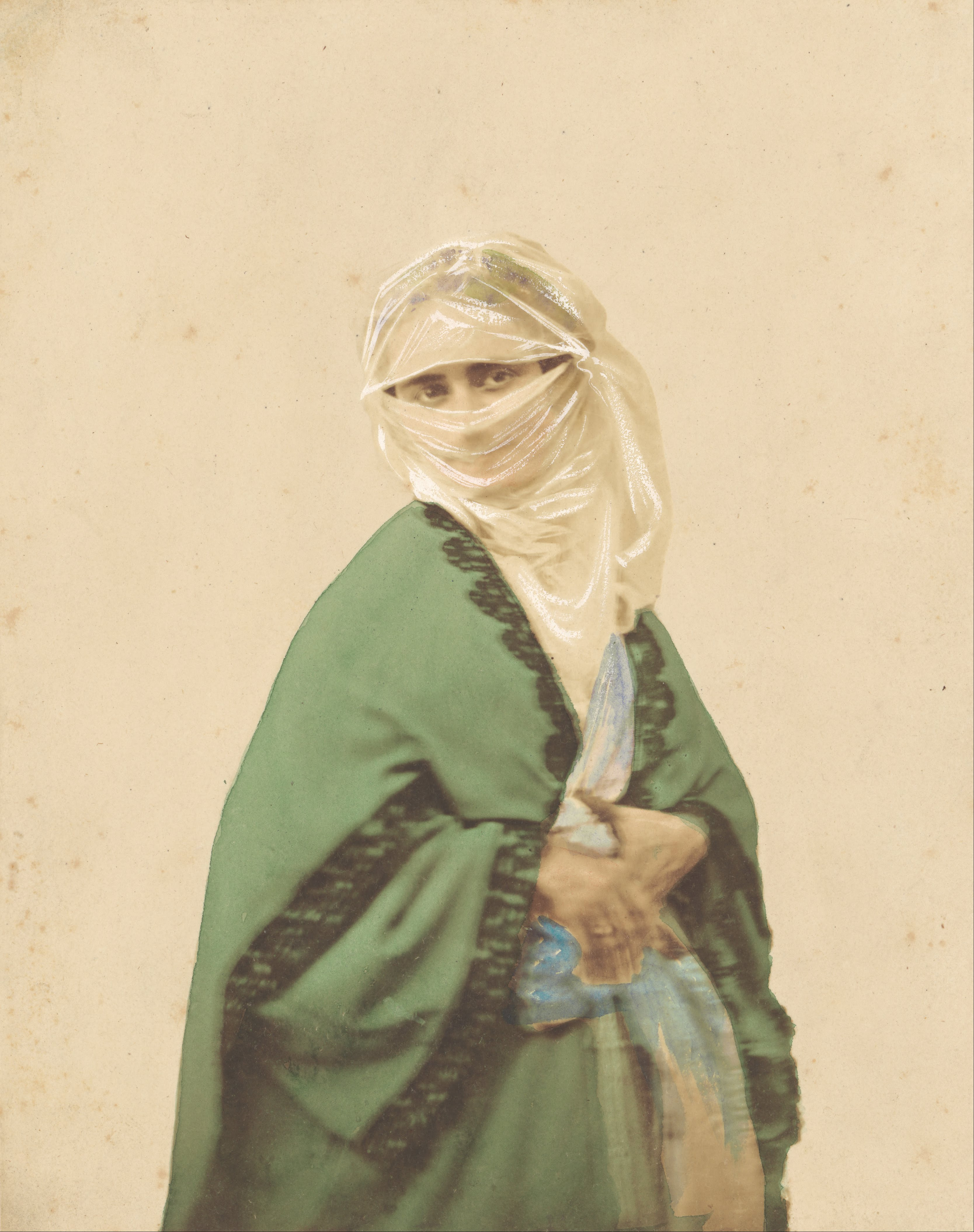
A Turkish Woman in Outdoor Dress, hand-coloured photograph, c. 1857

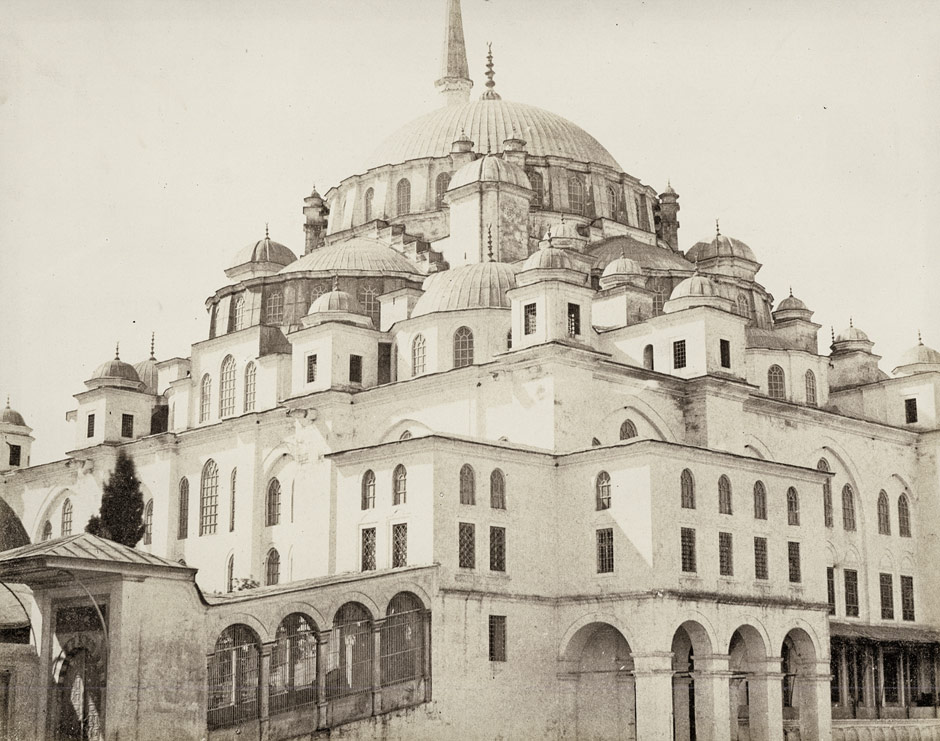
Fatih Mosque, photograph, c. 1852–1854

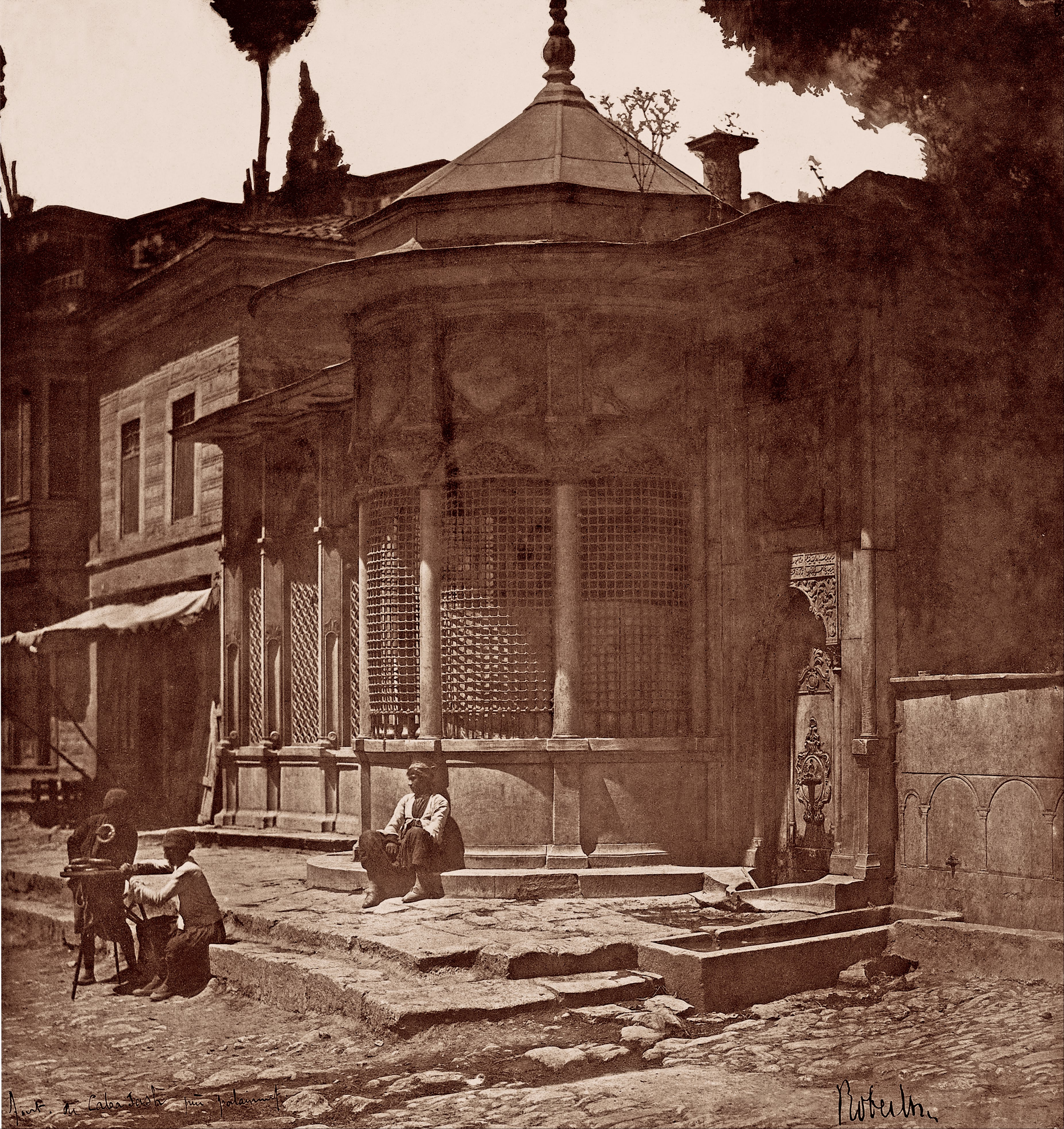
Mehmed Emin Ağa Fountain, photograph, date unknown

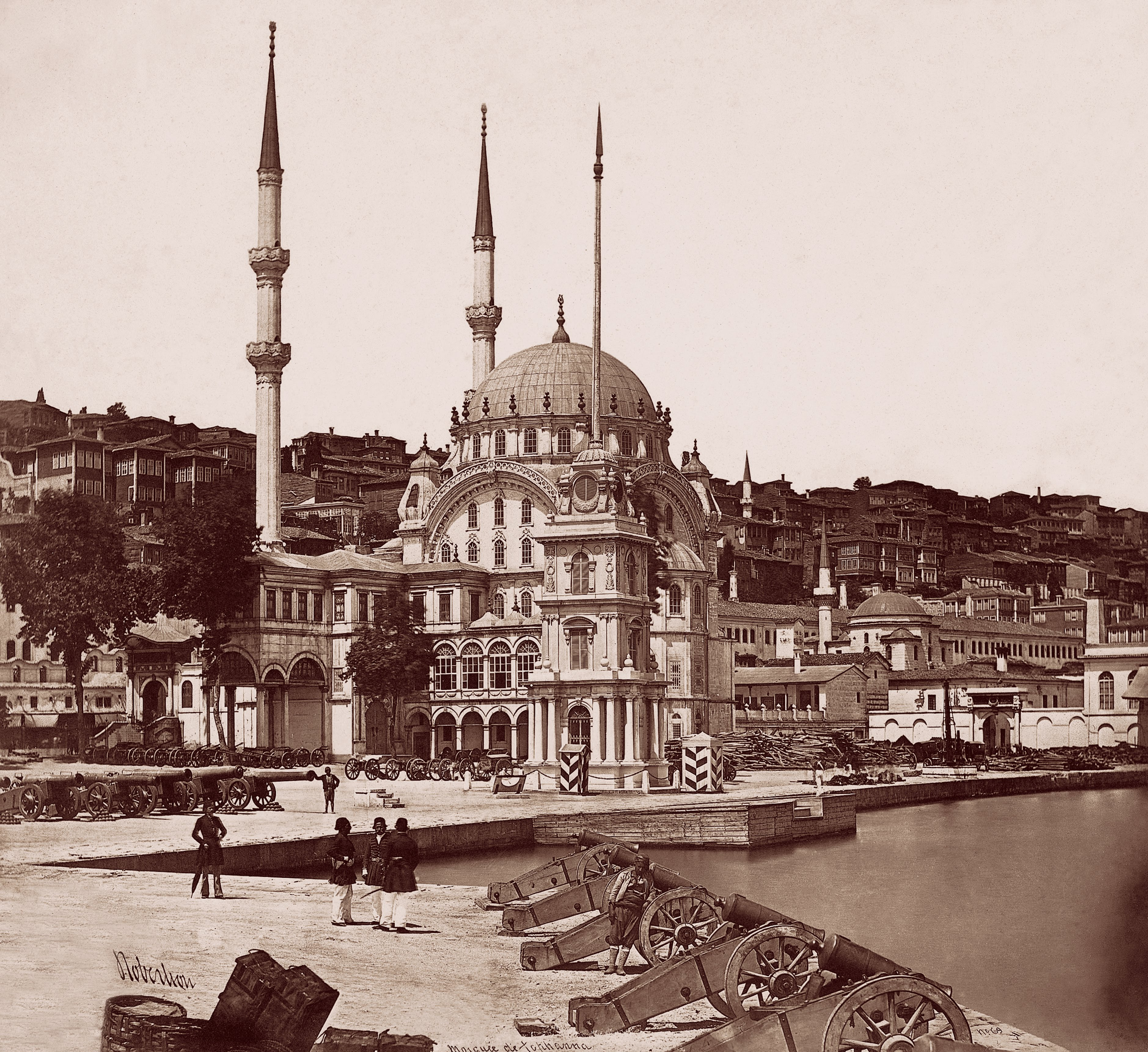
Nusretiye Mosque and Tophane Square, photograph, date unknown

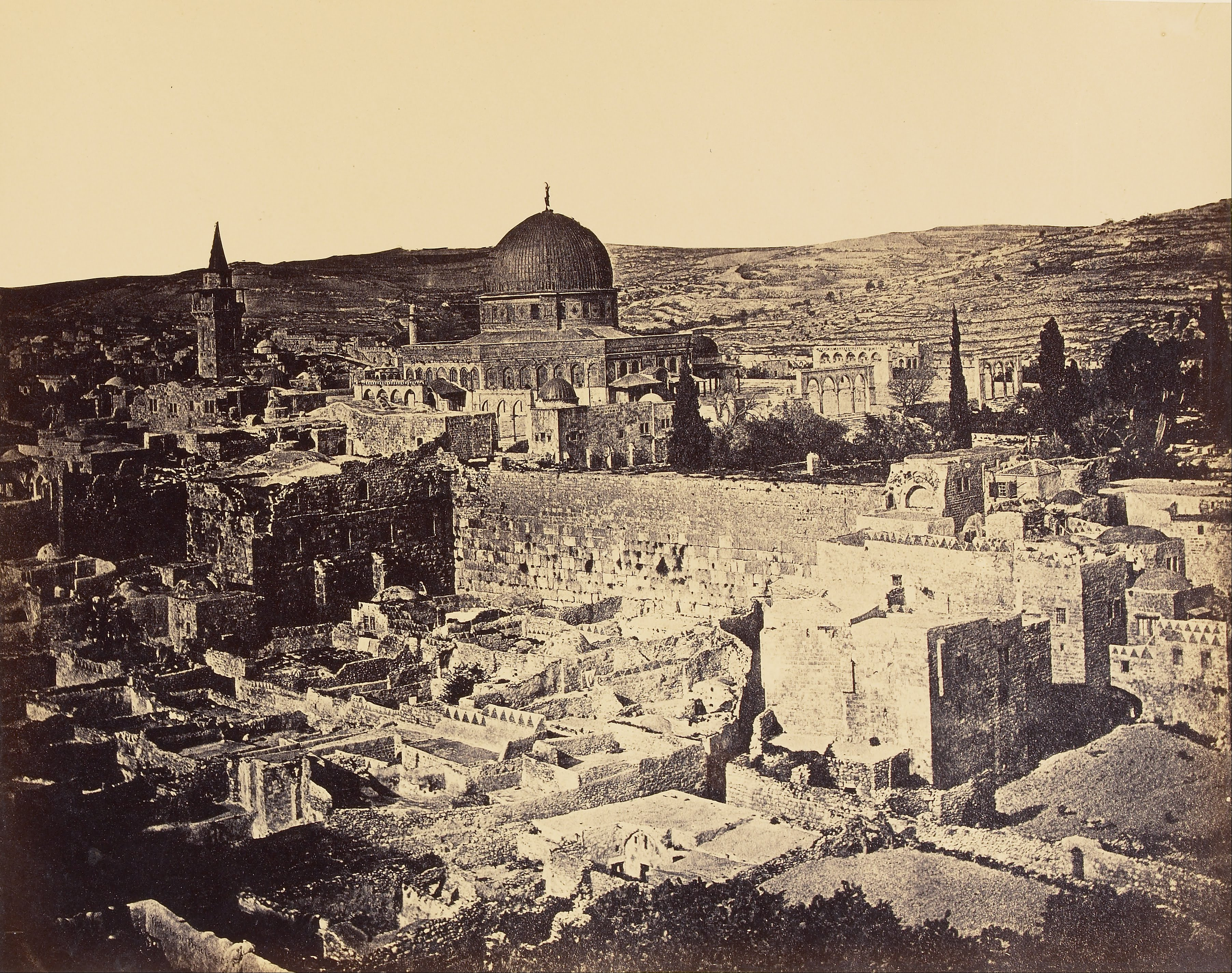
Dome of the Rock on Temple Mount and Wailing Wall, photograph, 1857

Selected war photographs

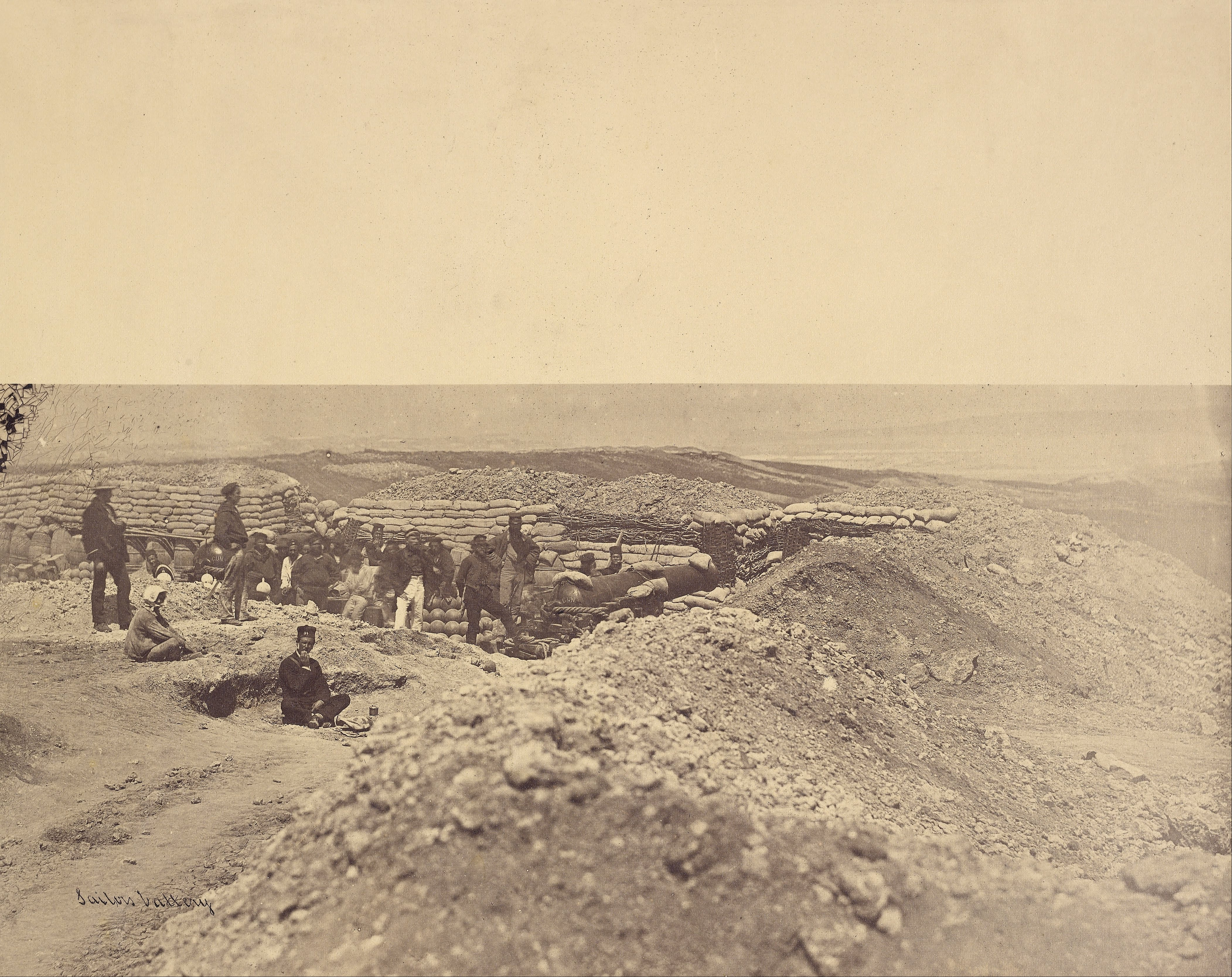
British Sailor's Battery, photograph, 1855

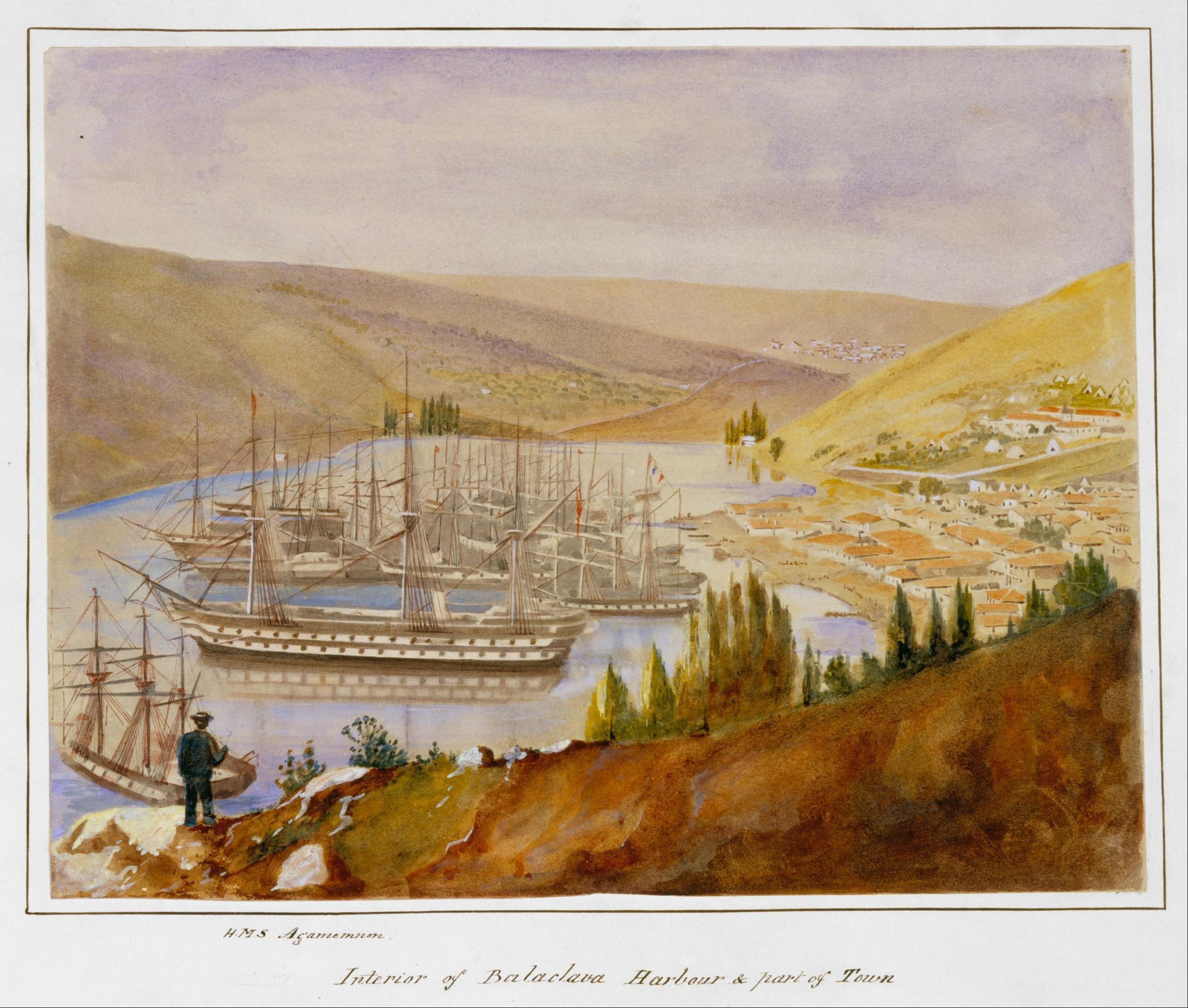
Interior of Balaclava Harbour and Part of Town, hand-coloured photograph, 1855

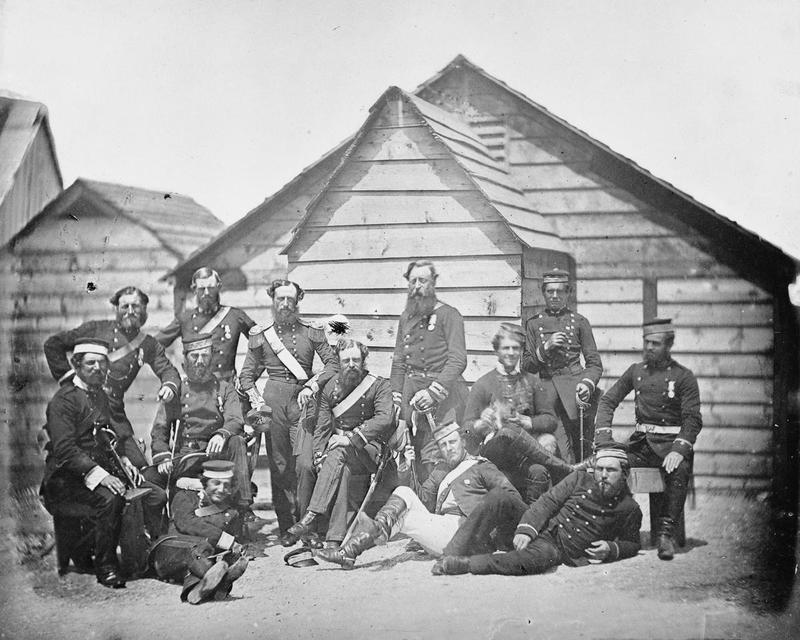
Crimean War, Group of soldiers outside a hut, c. 1855

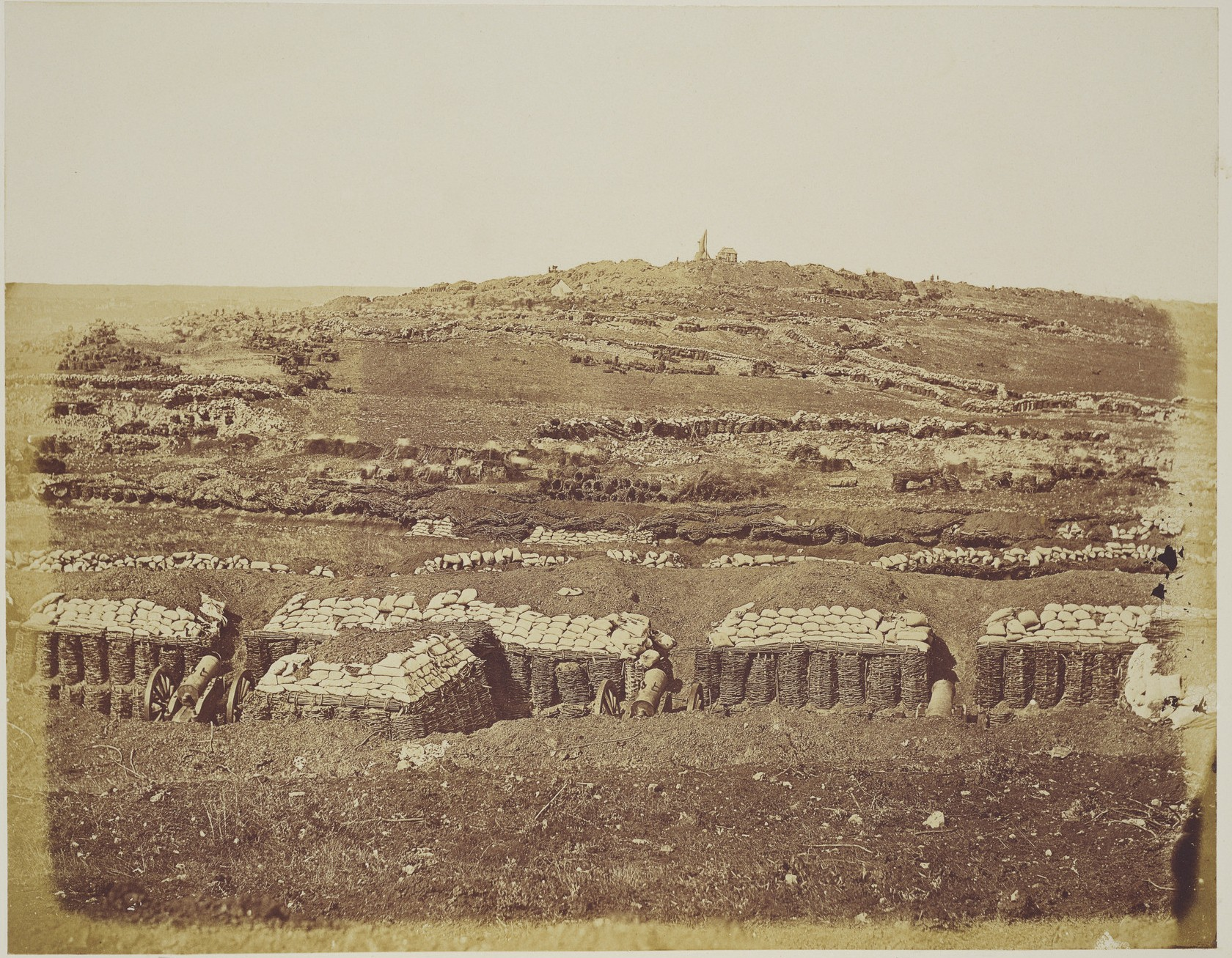
Malakoff from the Mamelon, photograph, 1855

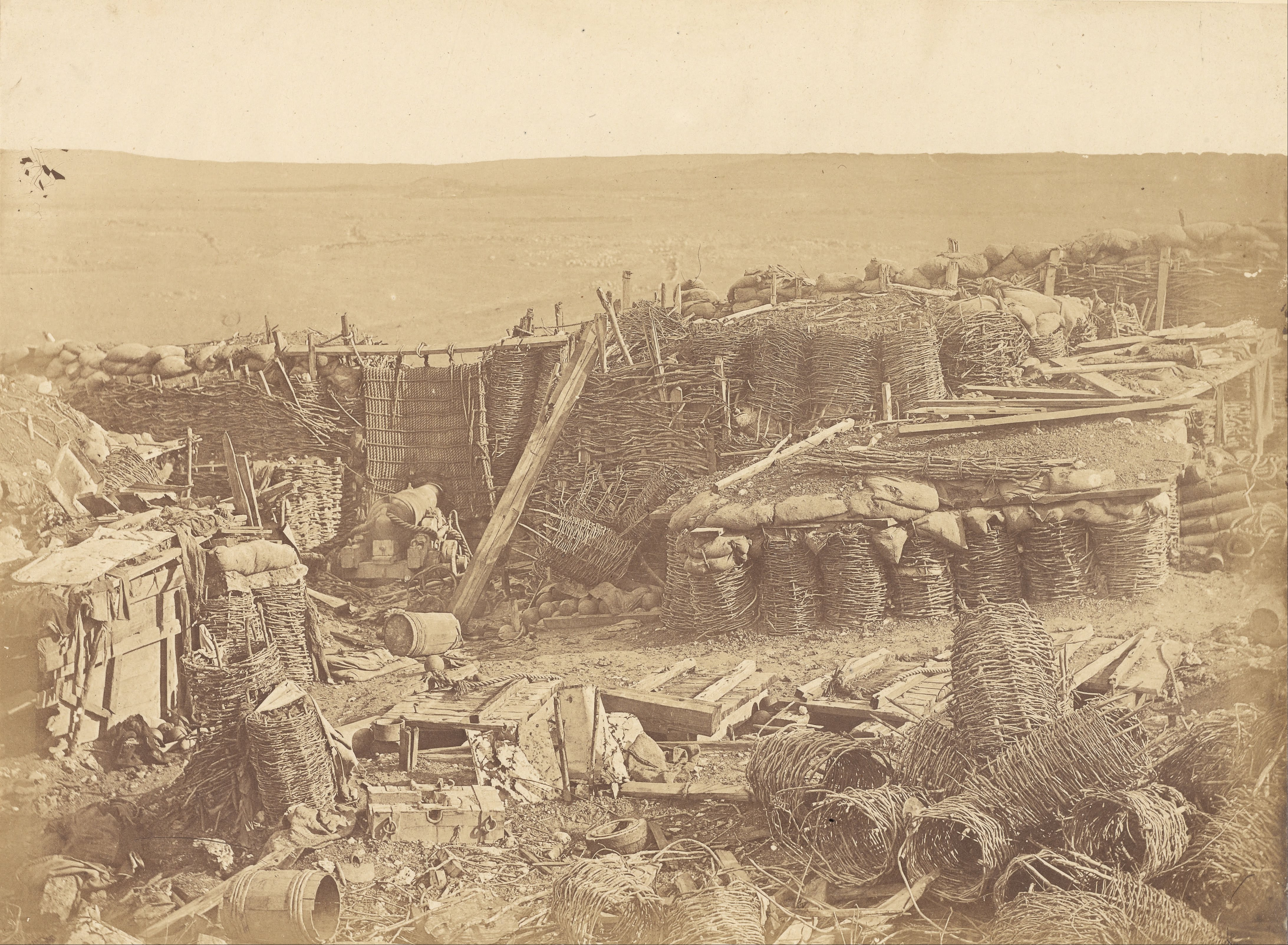
Interior of the Redan - Russian Battery, c. 1855

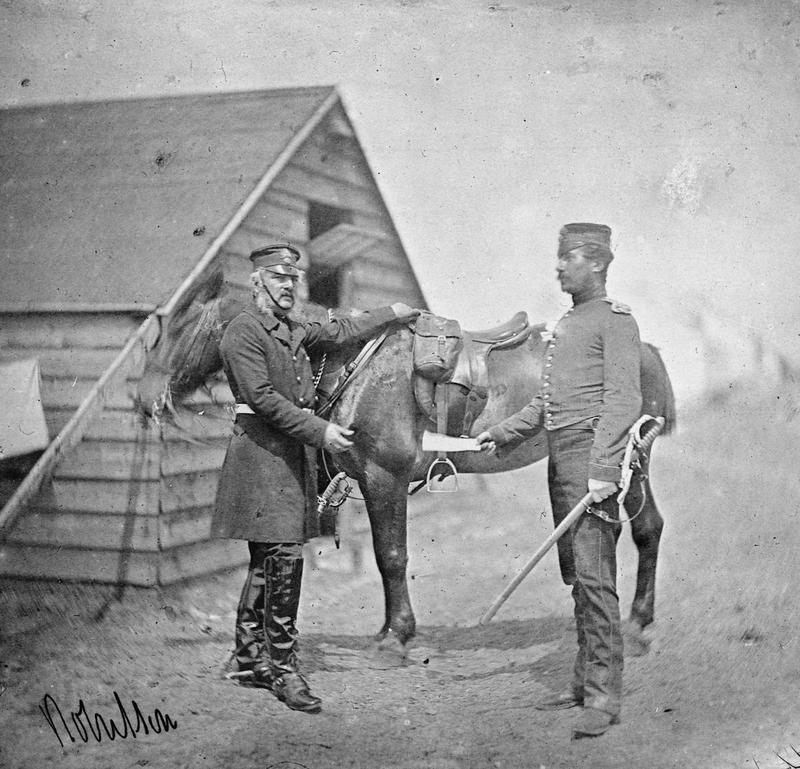
Crimean War, Colonel W.L.Yea with his horse, receives a signal from his adjutant, Lt.J.St Clair Hobson. Both killed at Sevastopol 18 June 1855, c. 1855

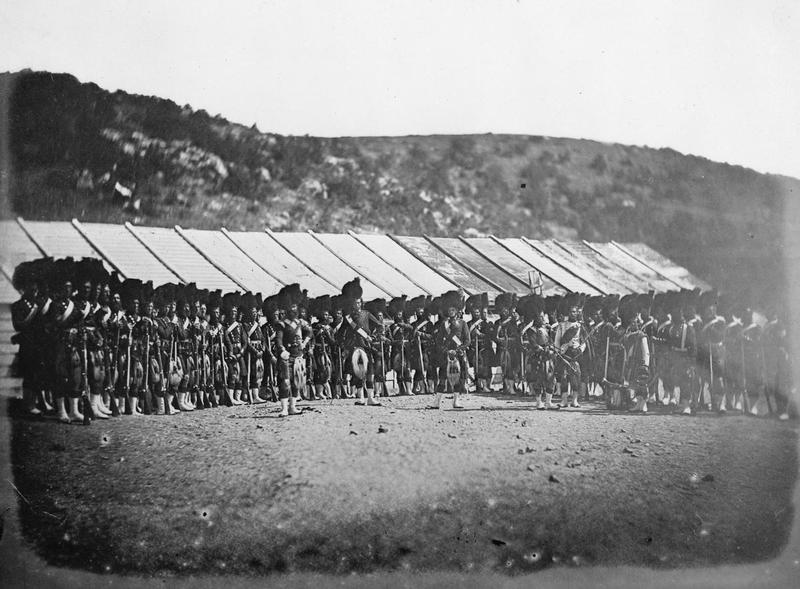
Crimean War, Scottish troops, wearing bearskin and kilts, c. 1855

Selected photographs by Robertson and Beato

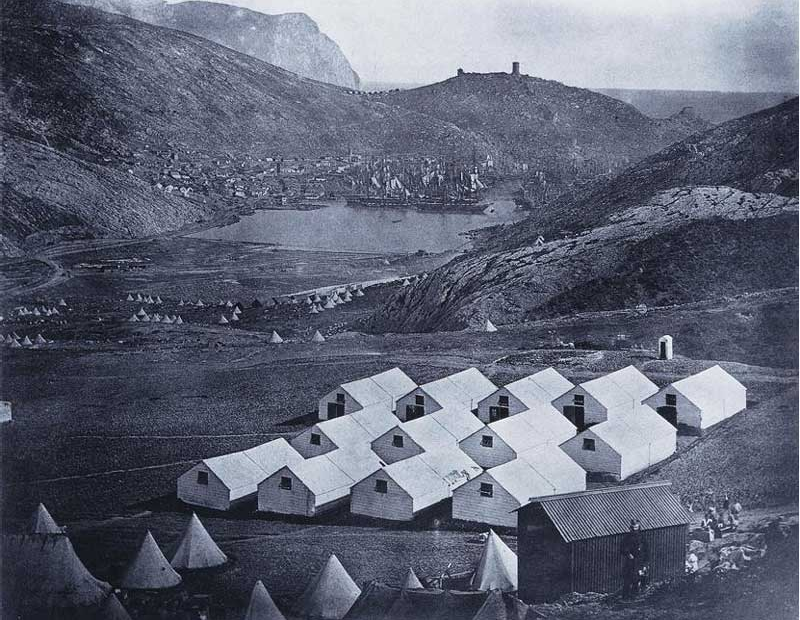
Army camp at Balaklava during the Crimean War, Albumen silver print by "Robertson & Beato", 1855

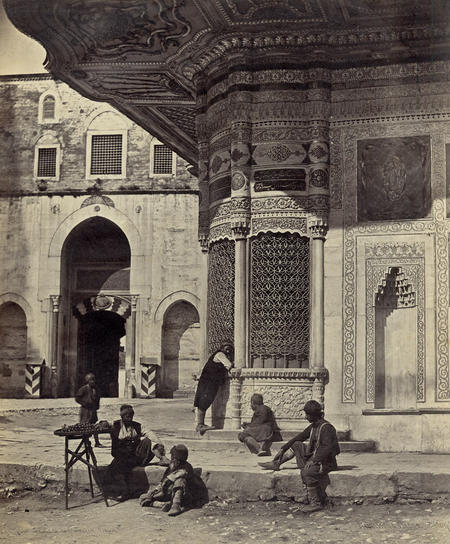
Imperial Port of Serail, c. 1854

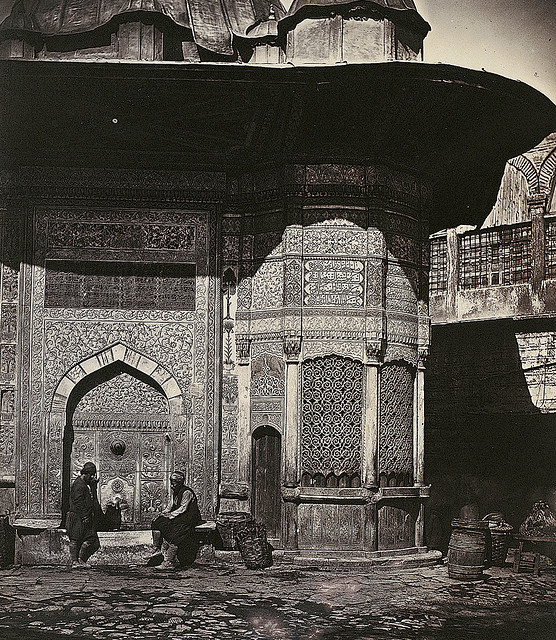
Figures at the Fountain of Sultan Ahmet III, Istanbul, 1850s

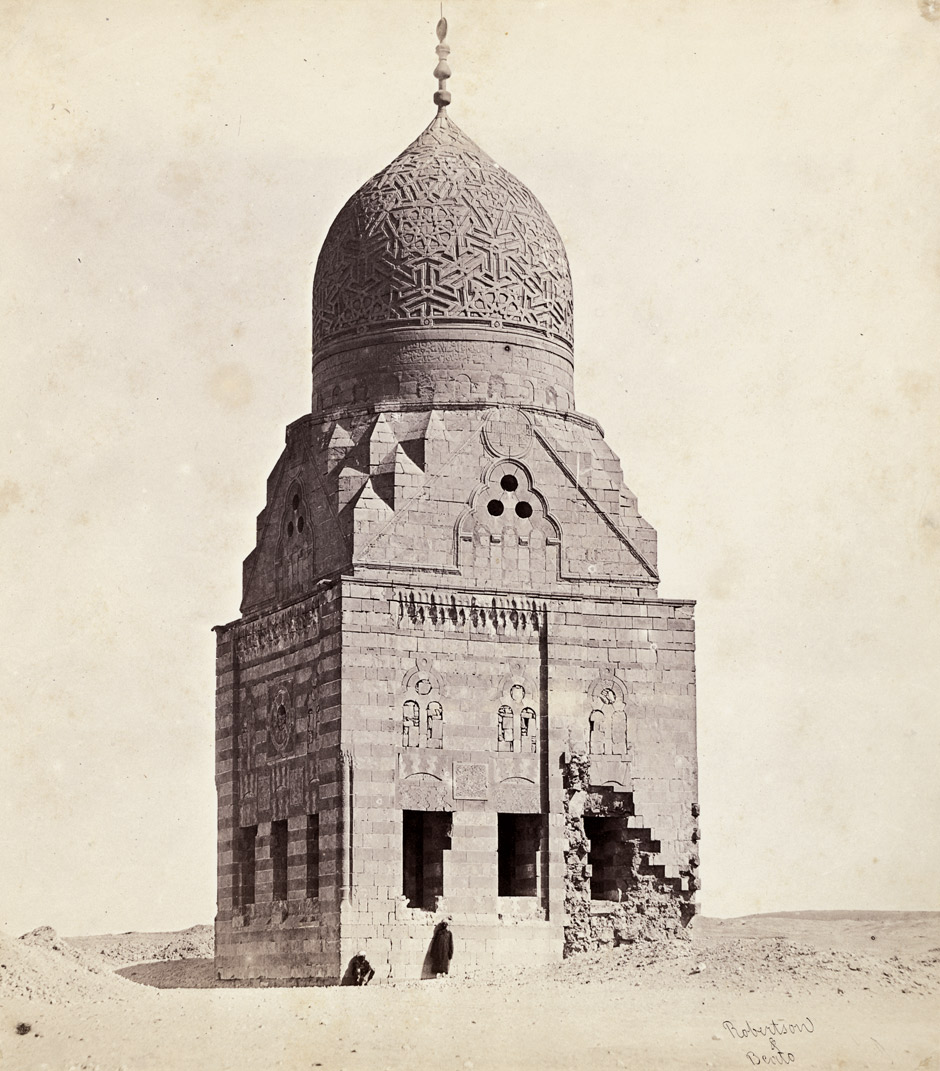
Tomb of Sultan az-Zahir Qansuh, c. 1858

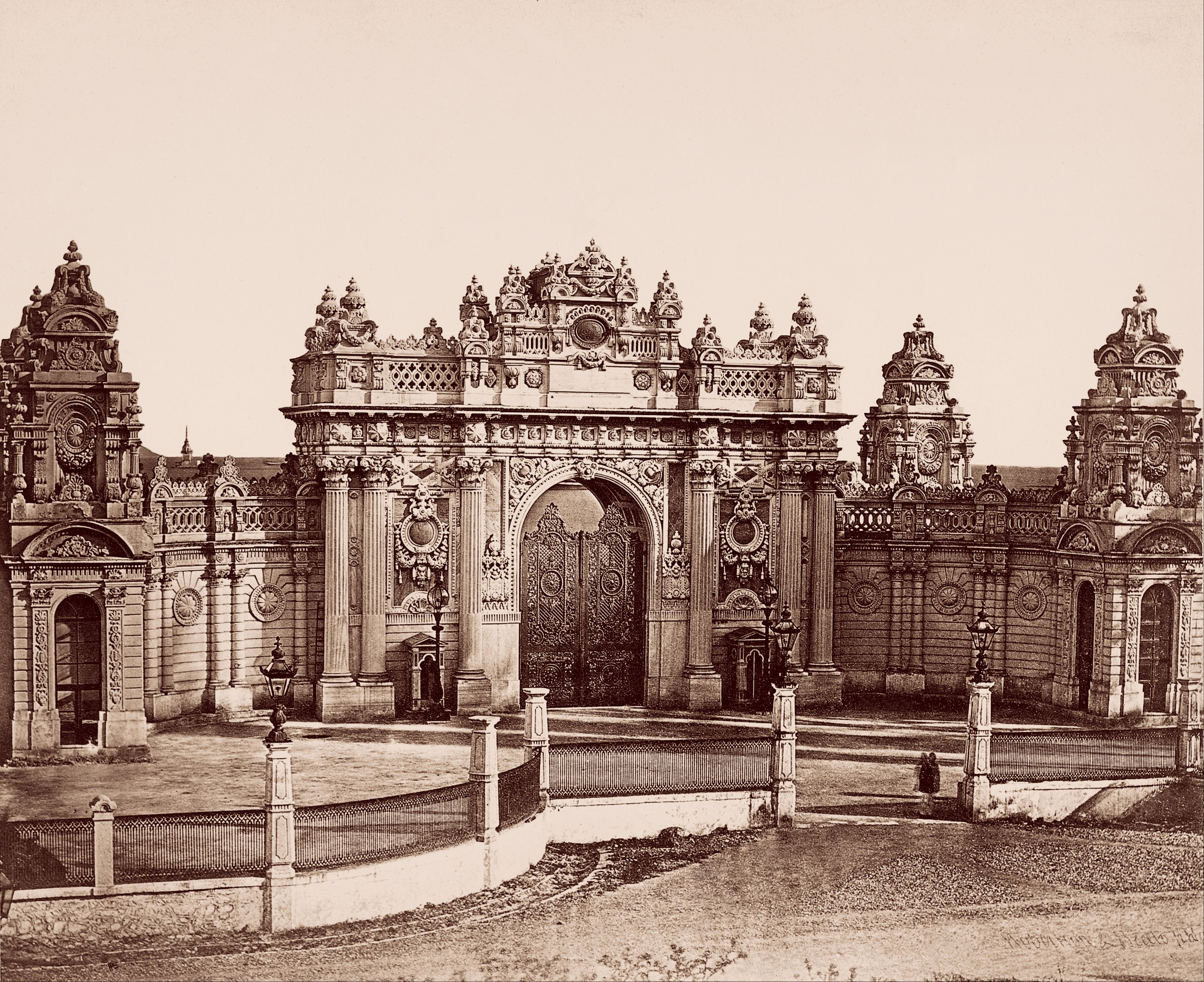
Dolmabahçe Palace Imperial Gate, date unknown

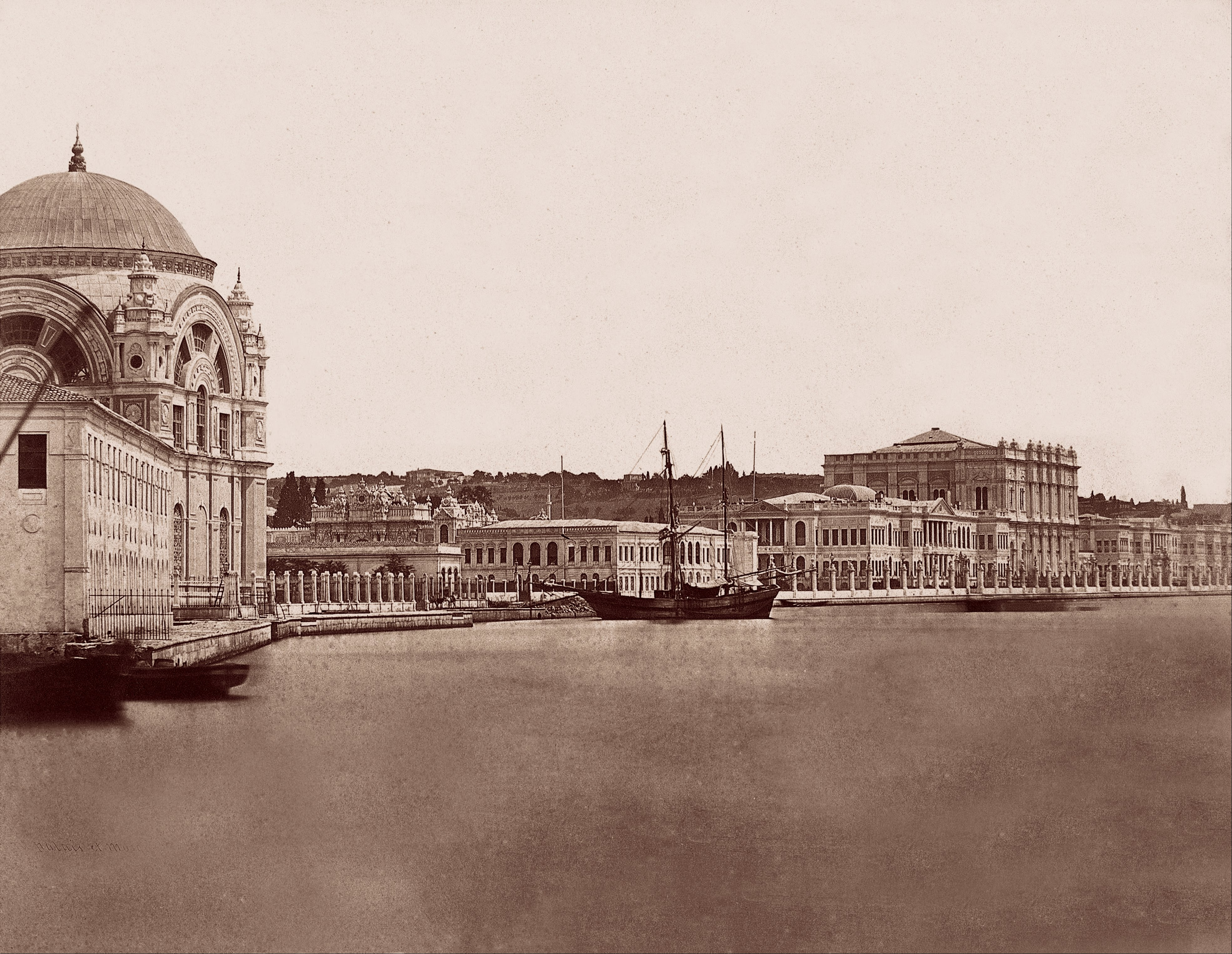
Dolmabahçe Palace and Mosque, date unknown

== See also ==
- History of photography
- List of Orientalist artists
- Orientalism
