= Antonio Beato =

Italian-British photographer (c. 1835–1906)

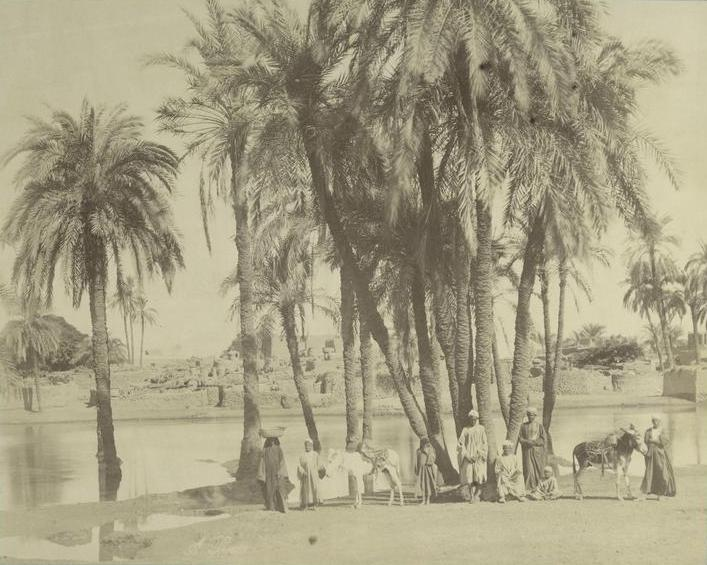
- Village of Karnak, photograph by Beato, 1880s
- Born: c. 1835; Austrian Empire
- Died: 1906 (aged 70); Luxor, Egypt
- Other name: Antoine Beato
- Occupation: Photographer
- Known for: His genre works, portraits, views of the architecture and landscapes of Egypt and the other locations in the Mediterranean region
- Relatives: Felice Beato (brother); Leonilda Maria Matilda Beato (sister) and James Robertson (photographer) brother-in-law

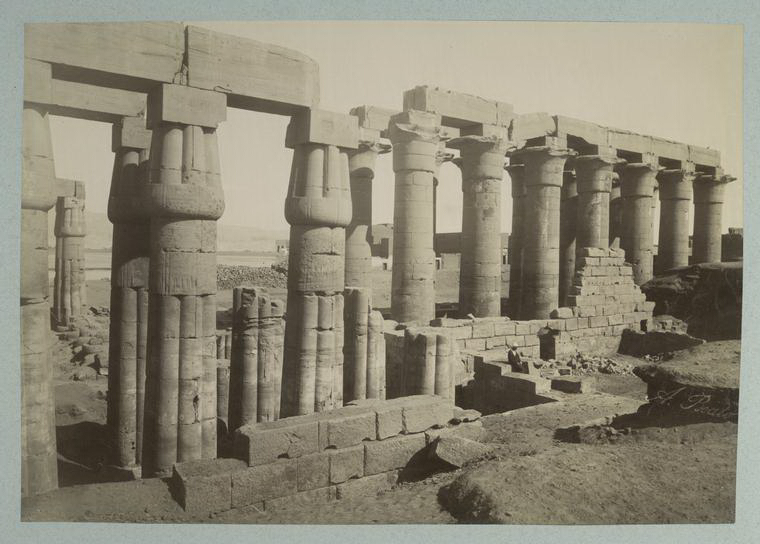
Luxor Temple, Luxor, Egypt. Albumen silver print by Antonio Beato, taken between 1860 and 1889

Antonio Beato (c. 1835–1906), also known as Antoine Beato, was an Italian-British photographer. He is noted for his genre works, portraits, views of the architecture and landscapes of Egypt and other locations in the Mediterranean region. He was the younger brother of photographer Felice Beato (1832–1909), with whom he sometimes worked. Antonio and his brother were part of a small group of commercial photographers who were the first to produce images of the Orient on a large scale.

== Life and work ==
Little is known of Antonio Beato's origins and early life. He was probably born in the Austrian Empire territory sometime after 1832, and later became a naturalised British citizen. His elder brother Felice Beato, at least, was born in Venice, but the family may have moved to Corfu, which had been a Venetian possession until 1814 when it was acquired by Britain. Antonio often used the French version of his given name, going by Antoine Beato. It is presumed that he did so because he mainly worked in Egypt, which had a large French-speaking population.

The existence of a number of photographs signed "Felice Antonio Beato" and "Felice A. Beato", led many scholars to assume that there was one photographer who somehow photographed at the same time in places as distant as Egypt and Japan. In 1983, it was shown that "Felice Antonio Beato" represented two brothers, Felice Beato and Antonio Beato, who regularly worked together, sharing a signature. The confusion arising from the signatures continues to cause problems in identifying which of the two photographers was the creator of any given image.

Virtually nothing is known about his training in photography. He may have become interested in photography through his brother, Felice, who is believed to have met the British photographer James Robertson in Malta in 1850, and purchased photographic equipment in Paris in around 1851, and later that year accompanied Robertson to Constantinople in 1851. Antonio joined his brother and Robertson in Malta in around 1853. A partnership, known as "Robertson & Beato" was formed in late 1853 or early 1854 in Pera, Constantinople. However, it is not entirely clear whether it was Antonio or Felice who was involved in the partnership. Some scholars believe that it was Antonio.

By the 1850s, tourist travel to Middle East created strong demand for photographs as souvenirs. Beato, and his brother were part of a group of early photographers who made their way to the East to capitalise on this demand. These pioneering photographers included Frenchmen, Félix Bonfils (1831-1885); Gustave Le Gray (1820-1884) and Hippolyte Arnoux, brothers Henri and Emile Bechard and the Greek Zangaki brothers, many of whom were in Egypt at the same time and entered into both formal and informal working partnerships. These early photographers, including Antonio and his brother, were among the first commercial photographers to produce images on a large scale in the Middle East.

In late 1854 or early 1855, the Beato brothers' sister, Leonilda Maria Matilda Beato, married her brothers' business partner, James Robertson. The couple had three daughters, Catherine Grace (b. 1856), Edith Marion Virginie (b. 1859) and Helen Beatrice (Nelly) (b. 1861). A number of the firm's photographs produced in the 1850s are signed Robertson, Beato and Co. and it is believed that "and Co." refers to Antonio.

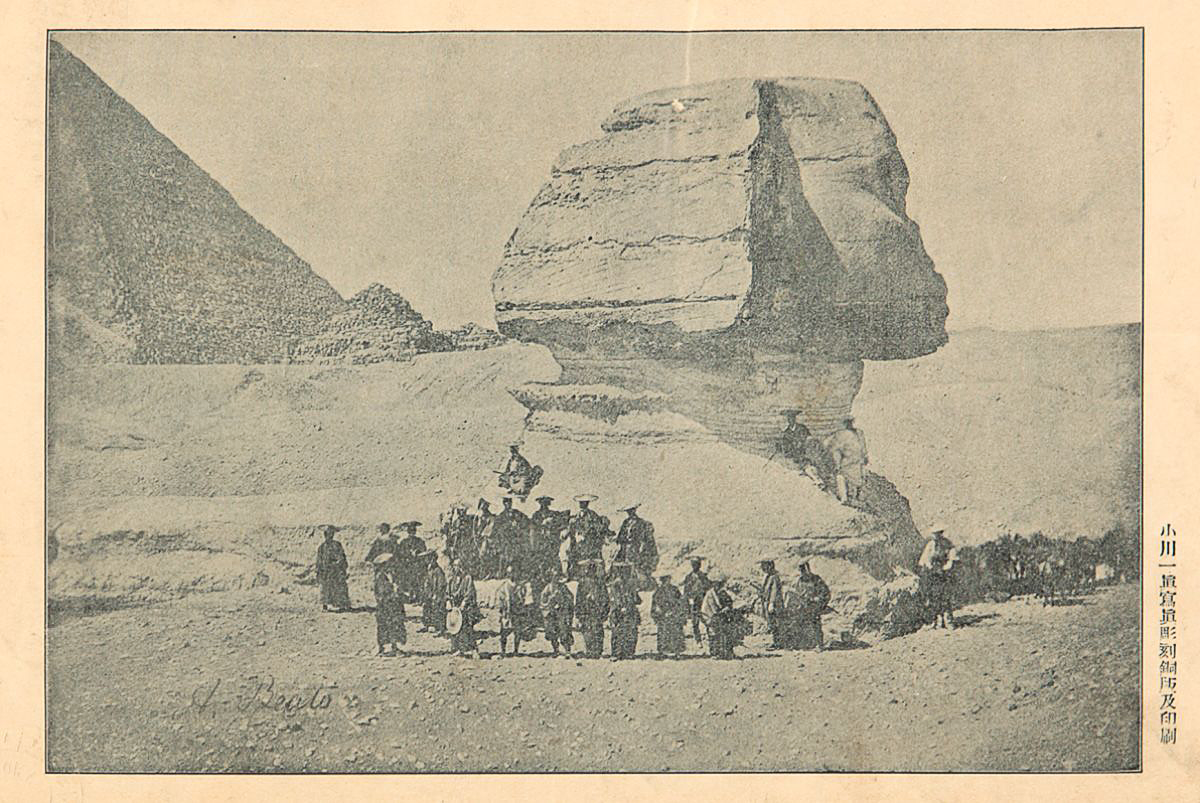
Members of Ikeda Nagaoki's Japanese Mission to Europe in front of the Sphinx, Egypt, 1864. Albumen print.

In July 1858 Antonio joined Felice in Calcutta. Felice had been in India since the beginning of the year photographing the aftermath of the Indian Rebellion of 1857. Antonio also photographed in India until December 1859 when he left Calcutta, probably for health reasons, and headed for Malta by way of Suez.

Antonio Beato went to Cairo towards the end 1859 or early 1860 and spent two years there before moving to Luxor where he opened a photographic studio in 1862 (until his death in 1906) and began producing tourist images of the people and architectural sites of the area. In the late 1860s, Antonio was in partnership with the French photographer, Hippolyte Arnoux. Beato's images of Egypt were distinctly different from those of other photographers working in the region. Whereas most photographers focussed on the grandeur of monuments and architecture, Beato concentrated on scenes of everyday life.

In 1864, at a time when his brother Felice was living and photographing in Japan, Antonio photographed members of Ikeda Nagaoki's Japanese mission who were visiting Egypt on their way to France.

Antonio Beato died in Luxor in 1906. His widow published a notice of his death while offering a house and equipment for sale.

A Freemason, he was member of a masonic Lodge in Beirut and later joined the Bulwer Lodge' Nr. 1068 in Cairo and was co-petitioner for the foundation of the Grecia Lodge Nr. 1105 in the Egyptian capital.

== Collections (selection) ==
Photographs by Antonio Beato are held in the following permanent collections:

- American Academy in Rome, Rome
- Art Institute of Chicago, Chicago
- Brooklyn Museum, New York
- Conway Library, The Courtauld Institute of Art, London
- J. Paul Getty Museum, Los Angeles
- Harvard Art Museums, Mass.
- The Metropolitan Museum of Art, New York
- Museo Egizio, Turin.
- National Gallery of Canada, Ottawa
- The Royal Collection, London
- Victoria and Albert Museum, London

== See also ==
- History of photography
- List of Orientalist artists
- Orientalism
