= Second Japanese Embassy to Europe (1864) =

Diplomatic mission led by Ikeda Nagaoki

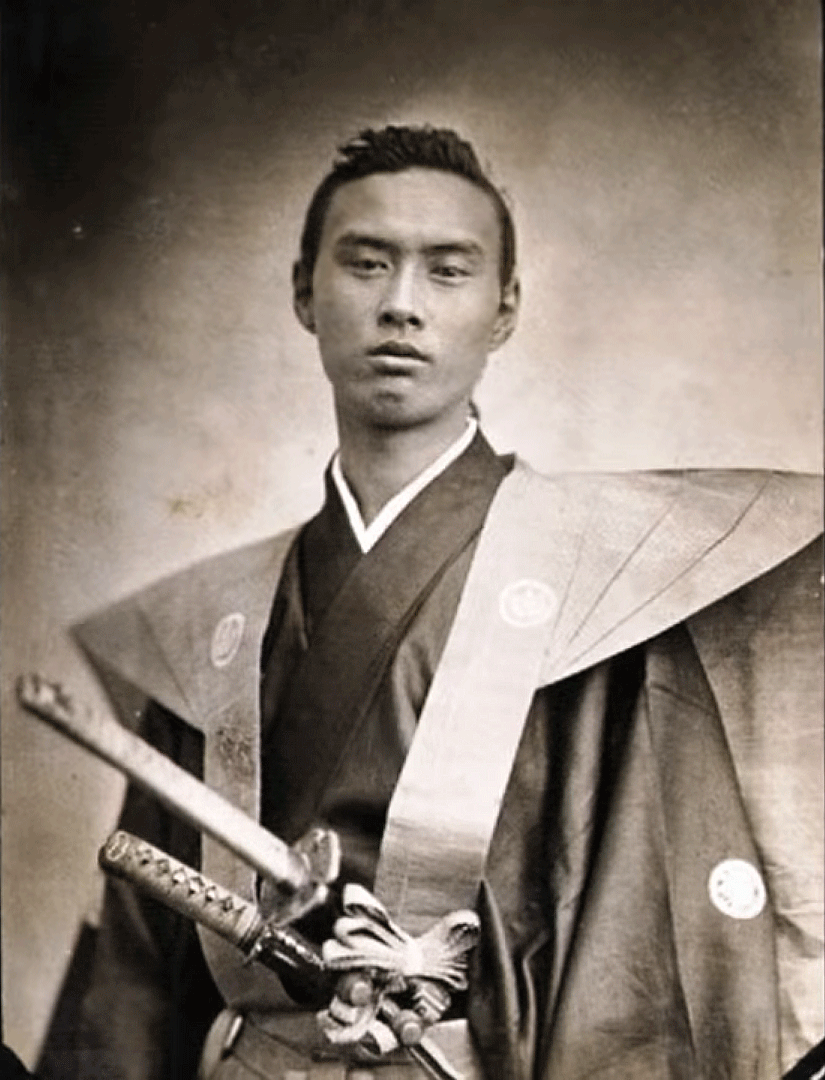
Ikeda Nagaoki was the head of the mission.

The Second Japanese Embassy to Europe (Japanese: 第２回遣欧使節, also 横浜鎖港談判使節団), also called the Ikeda Mission, was sent on February 6, 1864 by the Tokugawa shogunate. The head of the mission was Ikeda Nagaoki, governor of small villages of Ibara, Bitchū Province (Okayama Prefecture). The assistant head of the mission was Kawazu Sukekuni. It followed the so-called First Japanese Embassy to Europe (1862), even though the Tensho Embassy (1582–1590) and the expedition led by Hasekura Tsunenaga (between 1613 and 1620) had previously reached Europe centuries earlier.

The objective of the mission was to obtain French agreement to the closure of the harbour of Yokohama to foreign trade. The mission was sent following the 1863 "Order to expel barbarians" (攘夷実行の勅命) enacted by Emperor Kōmei, and the Bombardment of Shimonoseki incidents, in a wish to close again the country to Western influence, and return to sakoku status. The task proved impossible, as Yokohama was the center of foreign presence in Japan since the opening of the country by Commodore Matthew Perry in 1854.

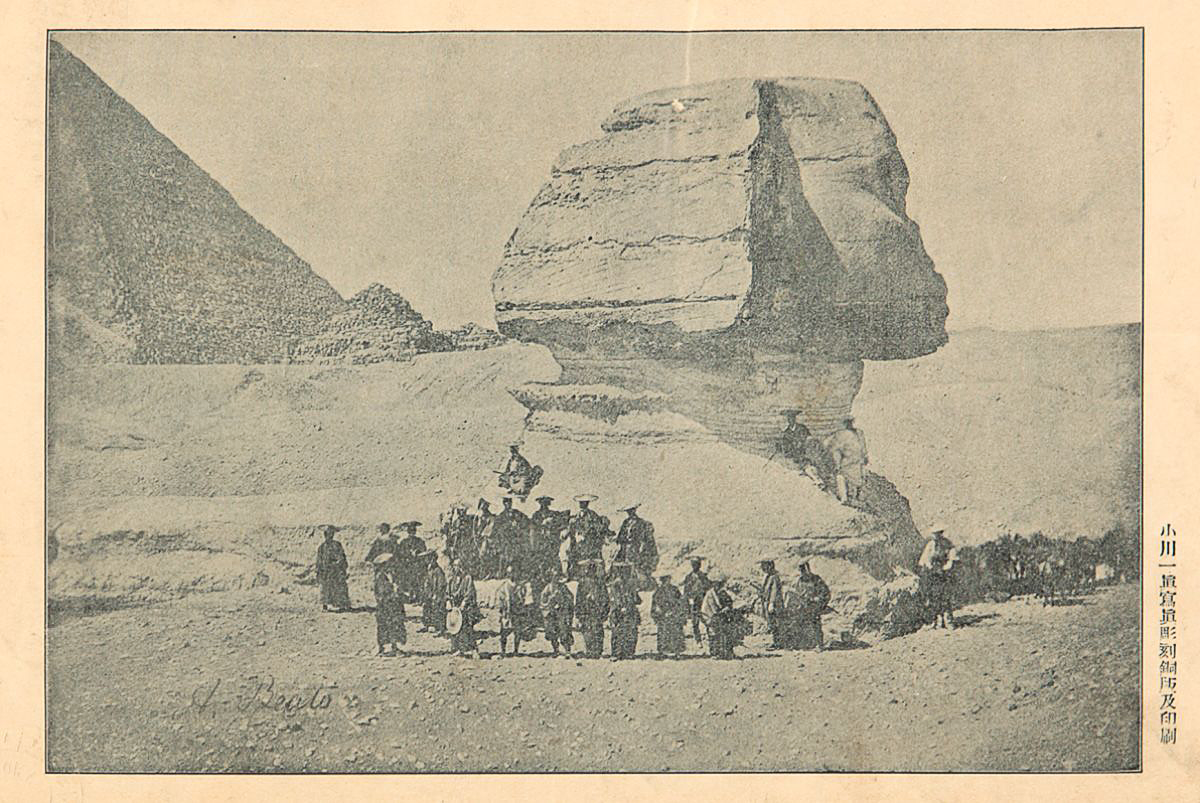
Members of the Ikeda Mission in front of the Sphinx, 1864.

On the way to France, the mission visited Egypt, where the members of the mission were photographed posing before the Sphinx by Antonio Beato, brother of the photographer Felice Beato. The members of the mission were abundantly photographed in Paris by Nadar.

The mission returned to Japan in failure, on August 23, 1864.

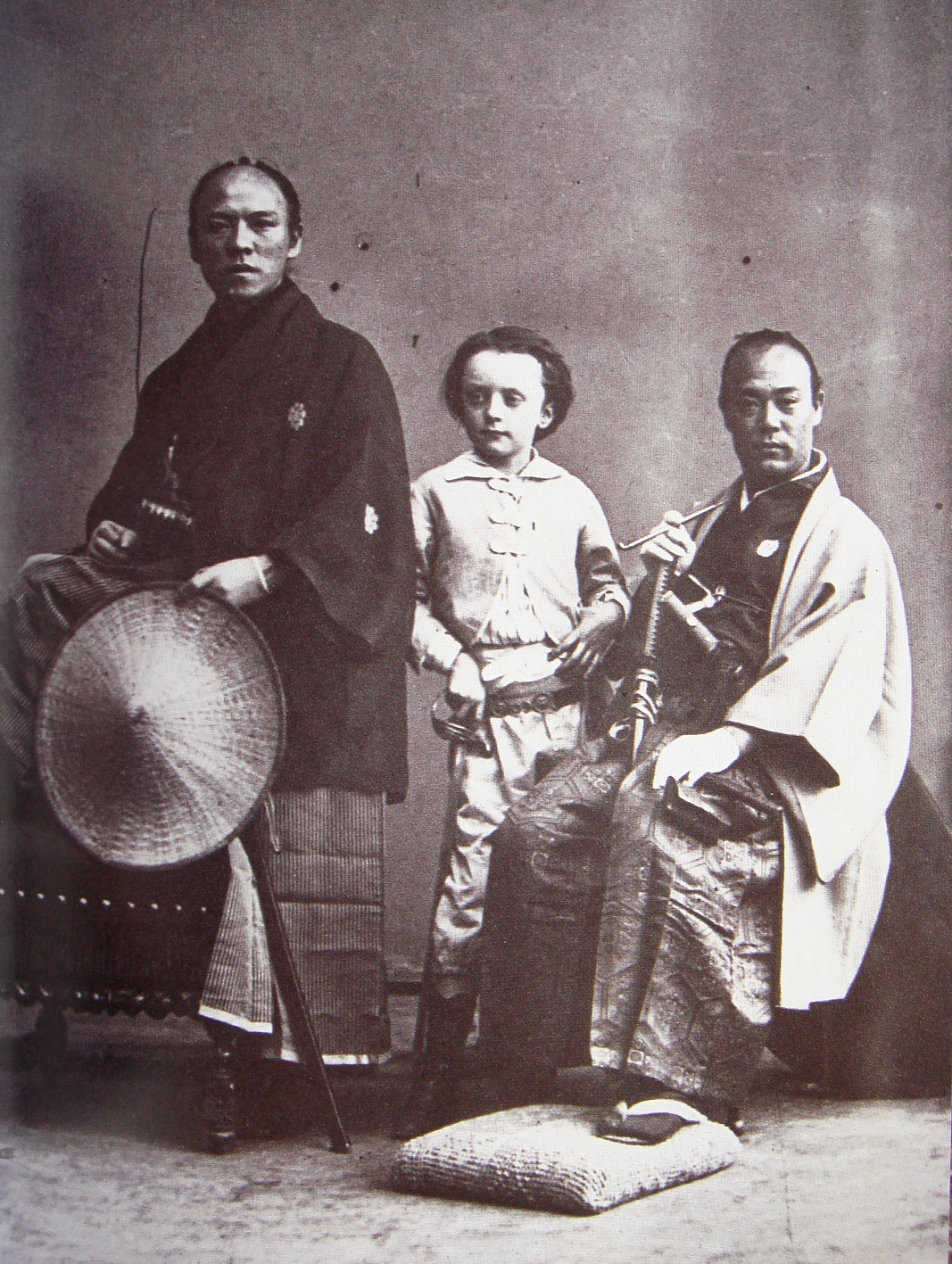
The son of Nadar, photographed in 1864 with members of the Ikeda Mission, Yatsu Kanshiro (left) and an unnamed samurai (right).

== See also ==
- Japanese Embassy to the United States (1860)
