= Hippolyte Arnoux =

French photographer and publisher

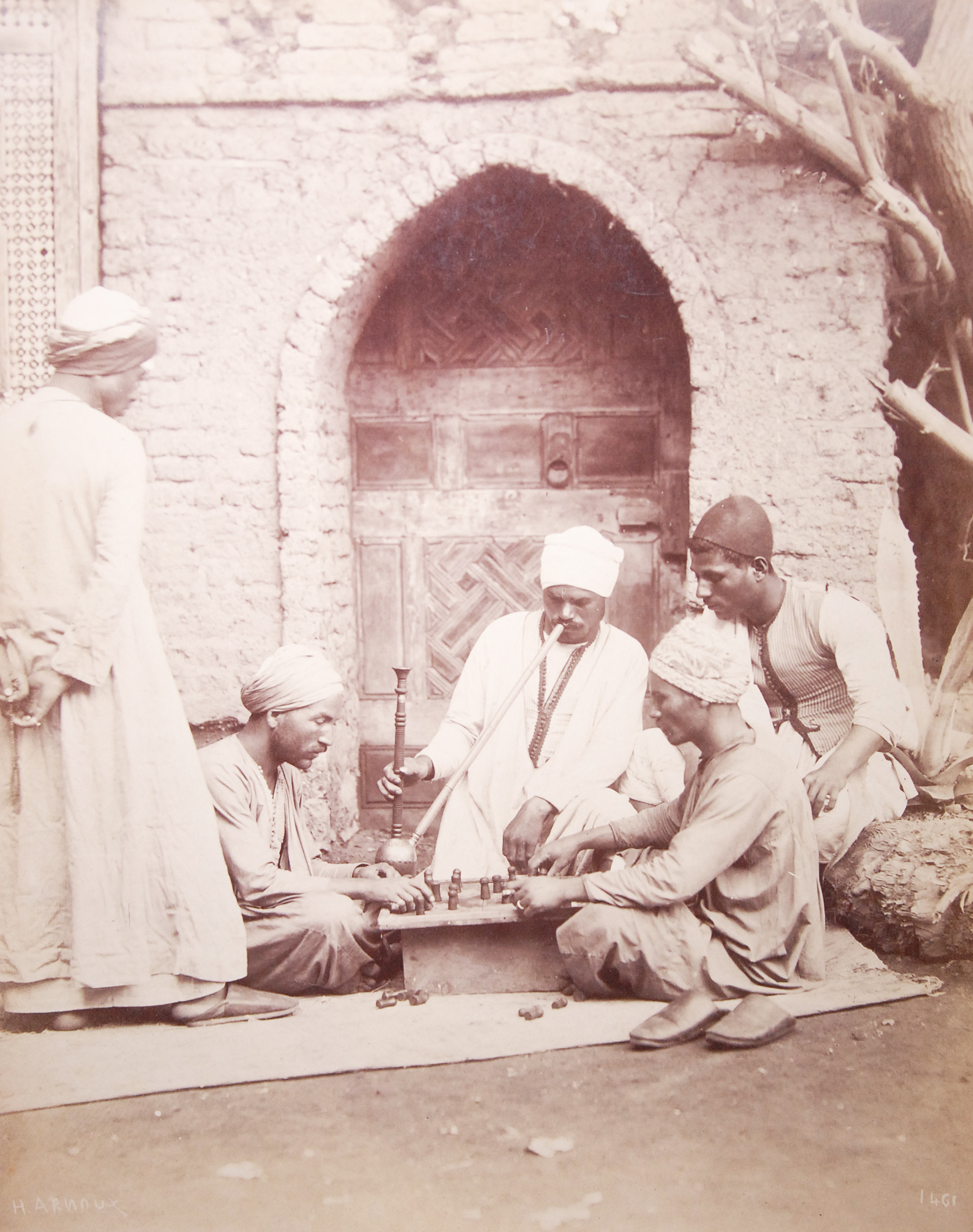
- Chess players in Ottoman Egypt
- Born: unknown France
- Died: unknown
- Years active: c. 1860 – c. 1891
- Known for: 19th-century photographer and editor in Ottoman Egypt
- Notable work: Album du Canal de Suez (A documentation of the construction of the Suez Canal)
- Style: Orientalist photography

Hippolyte Arnoux (French: [ipɔlit aʁnu]; active c. 1860 – c. 1891) was a French photographer and publisher. He was one of the first photographers to produce images of people and places in Ottoman Egypt. He is mainly known for his studio portraits and scenes of life in Egypt, as well as for his album of documentary photographs of the construction of the Suez Canal.

His photographs have been presented in specialized collections and exhibitions in the Middle East, Europe, the US, New Zealand and Australia.

== Life and career ==
Very little is known about this photographer, other than that he was active in Ottoman Egypt from the 1860s until at least 1890. His place and date of birth are unknown, but he is known to have been a French national. Similarly, his place and date of death are unknown, as is his final resting place.

By the 1850s, tourist travel to Egypt created growing demand for photographs as souvenirs. A small group of early photographers, mostly of French origin, made their way to Cairo and other regions of Ottoman Egypt to respond to this demand. These photographers included Félix Bonfils (1831-1885); Gustave Le Gray (1820-1884), the brothers Henri and Émile Bechard; Gabriel Lekegian (1853-1920), the British-Italian brothers Antonio Beato (c. 1832–1906) and Felice Beato as well as the Greek Zangaki brothers.

Although it is unclear when Arnoux first travelled to Egypt, he appears to have been there around the same time as this group of pioneering photographers. Some evidence points to a collaboration between Arnoux and the Zangaki Brothers, but the precise nature of any such relationship is unclear.

Arnoux established a studio in Place des Consuls in Port Said in the 1860s and later a different studio at Place Ferdinand de Lesseps, also in Port Said, in the 1860s and 1870s . Additionally, he operated a floating darkroom on the Suez Canal. Arnoux may have been the official photographer, appointed by the Suez Canal Company, to document the works on the canal that began in 1859 and were completed in 1869. In this capacity, Arnoux may have hired the Zangaki Brothers to assist him. At a later date, Arnoux also worked with the British-Italian photographer Antonio Beato.

In 1874, Arnoux instigated a lawsuit against the Zangaki Brothers and one Spiridion Antippa, accusing them of misappropriating his photographs. Arnoux was successful, and on 29 June 1876, the Court of Ismailia found them "guilty of usurpation of artistic and industrial property and unfair competition." At the Paris Exposition Universelle in 1889, Arnoux and the Zangaki brothers cooperated again in the presentation of the Suez Canal Company pavilion. As late as 1891, Arnoux was mentioned as a photographer in Port Said in the 10th edition of the Oriental Yearbook of Commerce, as were the Zangaki brothers.

Similar to other photographers based in Egypt, such as Antonio Beato, Félix Bonfils, Pascal Sébah and Émile Béchard, Arnoux documented monuments of ancient Egypt, landscapes and the inhabitants of cities such as Cairo and Port Said. For his studio portraits, he used European-style painted backdrops, creating staged Orientalist portraits of Turkish and Egyptian women. During the 1860s and 1870s, Arnoux first documented the construction of the Suez Canal as well as the first years of its use by ships traversing this new passage between the Mediterranean and the Red Sea. Paying homage to Ferdinand de Lesseps, the French diplomat who had started the project, Arnoux documented regions, people and ships in an illustrated map of the canal, as well as in his photographic Album du Canal de Suez.

== Reception ==
=== Scholarly studies ===
Scholars have characterized Arnoux’s style as combining rigorous documentation with elements that catered to European Orientalist tastes of the 19th century. Maria Golia noted that Arnoux’s work “balanced straightforward reportage with carefully composed images designed to appeal to the Western imagination of the exotic,” especially in his staged ethnographic scenes and picturesque views of ruins. His photographs of the Suez Canal works, on the other hand, have been described as systematic and almost industrial in perspective, emphasizing engineering achievements over local life.

Ken Jacobson argued that Arnoux’s compositions often employed strong linear perspectives, particularly evident in his images of canal dredging machines and labor gangs, which drew the viewer’s eye deep into the photographic frame. At the same time, Arnoux produced portraits and genre scenes that mirrored the studio tableaux style popular in Orientalist photography, with subjects posed to accentuate costume and setting.

Some art historians have also observed that, unlike contemporaries who favored romantic or moody tonal effects, Arnoux’s prints are frequently noted for their clarity and bright tonal range, reflecting a documentary impulse aligned with his commercial ambitions.

=== Collections and exhibitions ===
Cartes-de-visite and albumen prints from glass plate negatives by Arnoux are held in collections including the Victoria & Albert Museum, London, the National Library of France, Paris, the Getty Museum, Los Angeles, the Canadian Centre for Architecture, Montreal, the Queensland University of Technology, Brisbane, the Museum of New Zealand, Wellington and the Netherlands Photo Museum, Rotterdam. Exhibitions of his work have been shown in 1997 in Paris and in 2009 in Sharjah, UAE. The latter show and accompanying catalogue presented Orientalist photographs of Egypt and the Middle East in the late 19th and early 20th centuries by Arnoux and other photographers from the Walther Collection, New York.

== Gallery ==
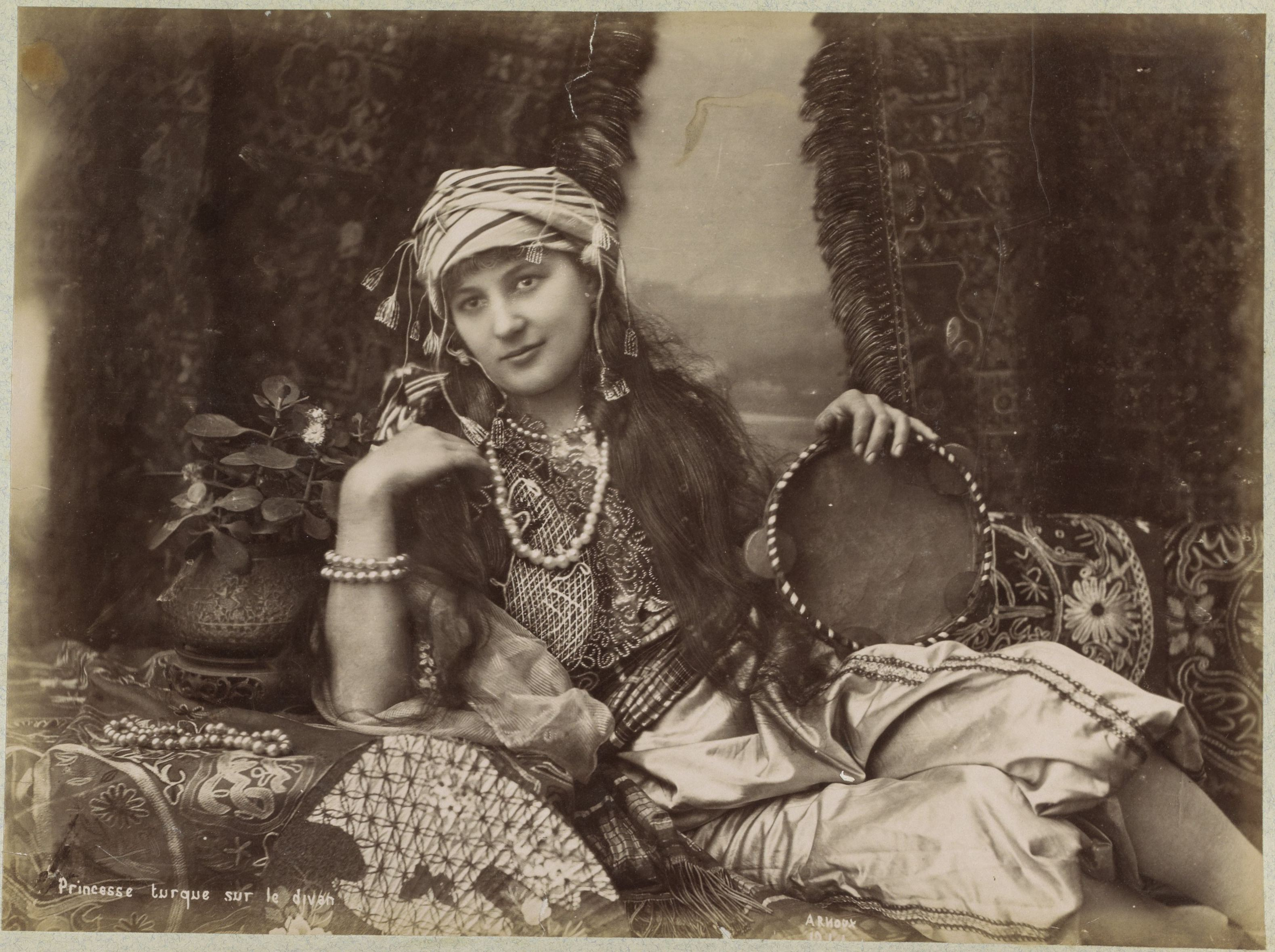
"Turkish Princess on her divan"

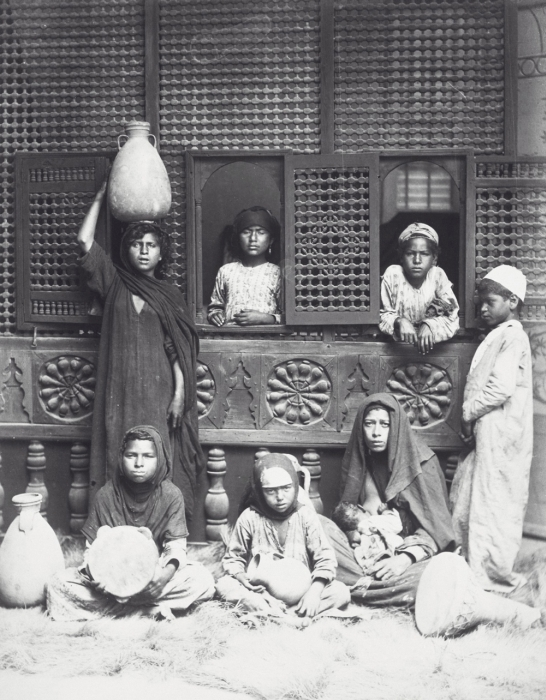
Egyptian women and children, c. 1890

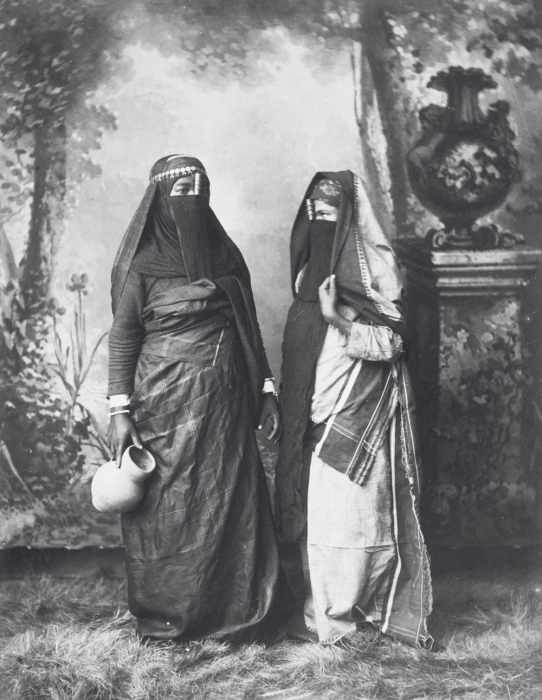
Studio portrait of two Egyptian Women

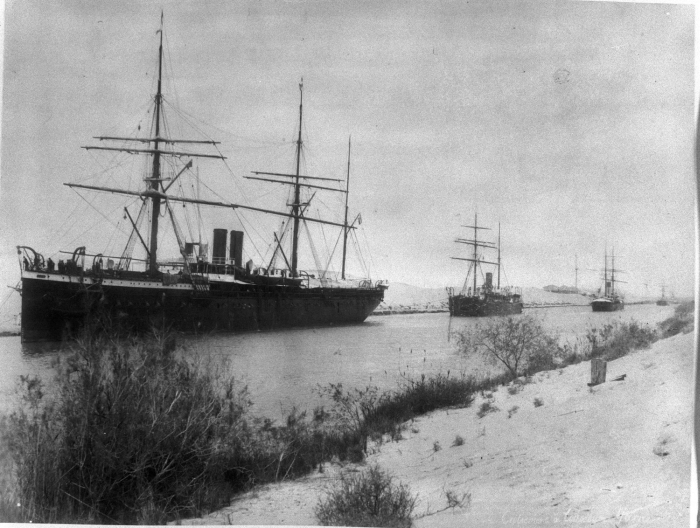
Cargo ship in the Suez Canal, c. 1880

== See also ==
- History of photography 1850 to 1900
- Orientalism
