= Adelphoi Zangaki =

Greek photographic studio active in Cairo and Port Said (1860s–1890s)

Adelphoi Zangaki (Zangaki Brothers)
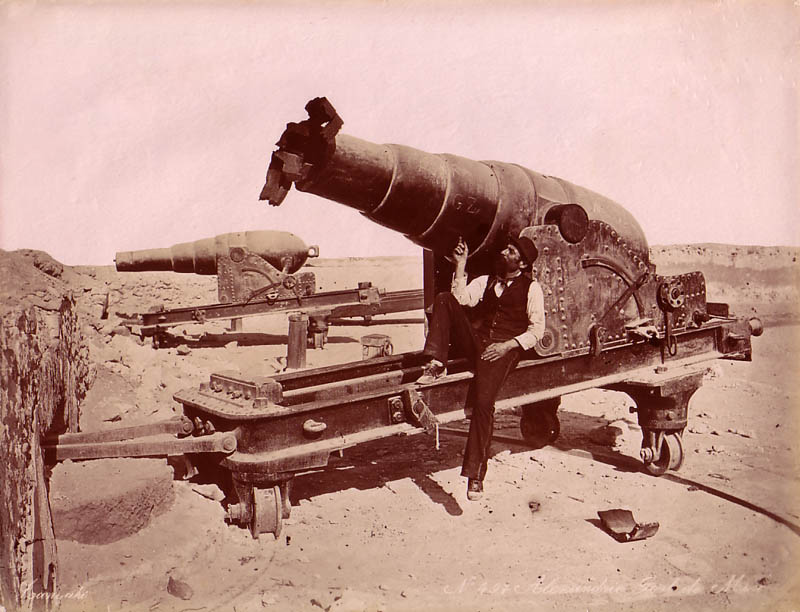
- One of the Zangaki brothers, sitting on a cannon and pointing to the initials G.Z. carved on its barrel, most likely George, 1870s
- Born: (Probably) George and Constantinos Zangakis; Dates unknown
- Died: Unknown
- Known for: Photographers
- Movement: Orientalist

The Adelphoi Zangaki (Zangaki Brothers), known by their probable initials C. and G. Zangaki, were two brothers of Greek origin, active as photographers in Ottoman Egypt from the 1860s through to the 1890s. They specialized in photographing ancient monuments and scenes of everyday life, producing photographic prints for the tourist trade. They occasionally worked with the French photographer Hippolyte Arnoux in Port Said, documenting the works on the Suez Canal. Further, they were among the first commercial photographers to produce large scale images of late 19th- century Egypt.

== Background ==
Little is known about the Zangaki brothers, except their initials, C. and G., and that they worked out of Port Said and Cairo from around the 1860s through to at least the 1890s. Many of the Zangaki photographs are signed with a brother's initial and/or a place of business, e.g., "C. Zangaki" or "Zangaki, Cairo" or occasionally "A. Zangaki".

For a long time, it was believed that "A. Zangaki" was a single photographer. However, with the discovery of a signboard with the name "Adelphoi Zangaki", it became clear that these were brothers. Scholars believe that their names were George and Constantinos (or Costas), and that they were born on the Greek island of Milos, while others have suggested that they were Cypriot. However, no definitive evidence pertaining to their place and date of birth extists. How they came to learn photography is also unclear. However, shortly after their arrival in Egypt they had become established photographers with studios in Cairo and Port Said.

== Early photographers in Egypt ==
By the 1850s, tourist travel to Egypt created strong demand for photographs as souvenirs. A small group of early photographers, mostly of French origin, made their way to Cairo and the Nile valley to capitalise on this demand. These pioneering photographers included Félix Bonfils (1831–1885); Gustave Le Gray (1820–1884), Emile Béchard (his brother Henri signed some of his photographs; active 1860–1890); the British-Italian brothers Antonio Beato (c. 1832–1906) and Felice Beato (1832–1909) as well as Hippolyte Arnoux (active between 1860 and 1890) and some years later, Gabriel Lekegian (1853–1920).

== Career ==
Photographs taken by the Zangaki brothers are found in tourists' albums assembled in the Middle East in the second half of the 19th century. From their Port Said studio, they were ideally situated to sell to Europeans visiting Egypt as part of a Grand Tour. The Zangaki brothers traveled along the Nile, accompanied by a horse-drawn darkroom wagon to document the Egyptian scenery, architecture and events. Images included views of the pyramids at Giza or the Sphinx and cities, such as Suez or Alexandria, as well of Egyptians going about their daily lives, e.g., a teacher and pupils, men working by the Nile or women at home.

They may have worked with the French photographer Hippolyte Arnoux to document the construction of the Suez Canal. Most scholars believe that Arnoux was the official Suez photographer and that the Zangaki Brothers may have assisted him. However, the precise nature of their relationship is unclear, since Arnoux's biography is just as enigmatic as that of the Zangaki brothers. Their relationship soured in 1874, when Arnoux instigated litigation against the Zangaki Brothers and one Spiridion Antippa, accusing them of usurping his intellectual property. Arnoux was successful, as on 29 June 1876, the Court of Ismailia recognized them as "guilty of usurpation of artistic and industrial property and unfair competition."

In Palestine they photographed areas of Jerusalem, Bethlehem, Mar Saba, Mount Tabor and the Jerusalem railway. Some of their original glass negatives as well as prints are in the collection of the Palestine Exploration Fund.

== Recognition ==
Art historian John Hannavy acknowledged that the Zangaki brothers "produced some of the finest images" of the late 19th century in Egypt. Mainly produced for the expectations of the flourishing European tourist trade in Egypt, they are highly prized by historians and collectors for their representations of life at the time.

Photographs by Zangaki Brothers

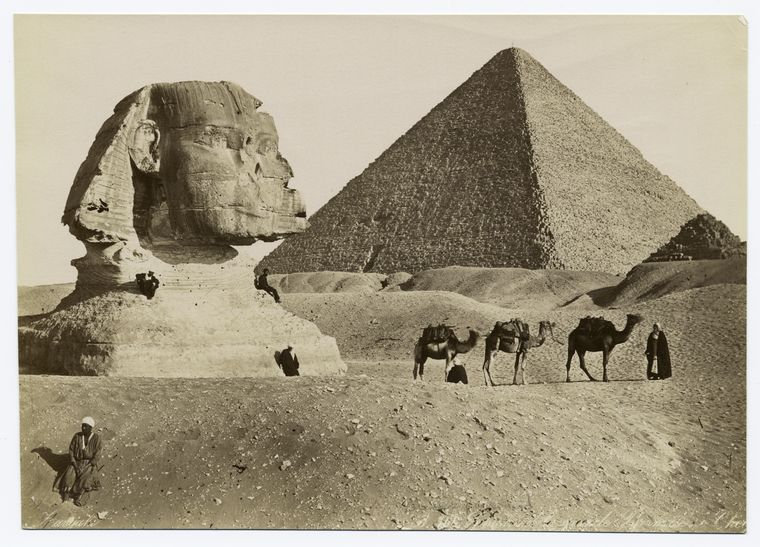
The Sphynx and the Great Pyramid at Giza

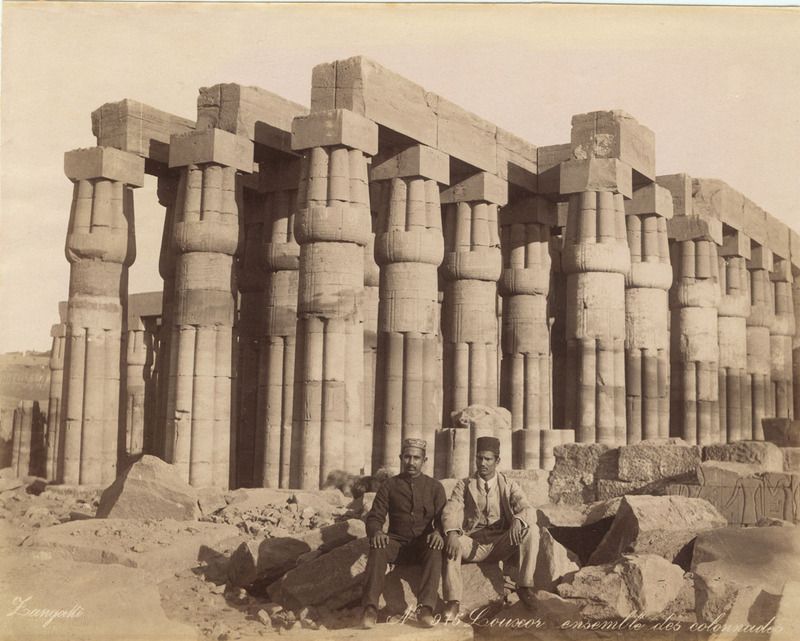
Colonnade at Luxor

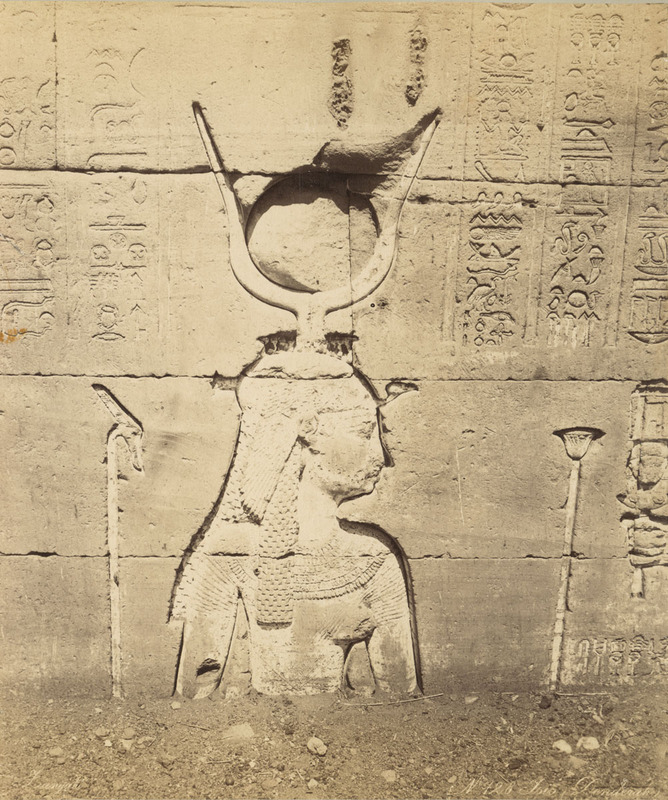
Dendera

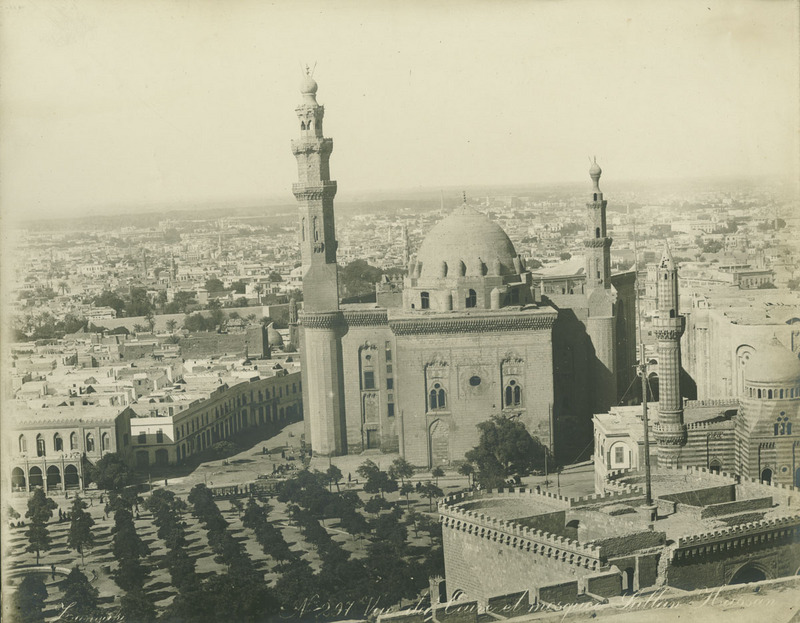
Sultan Hassan Mosque, Cairo

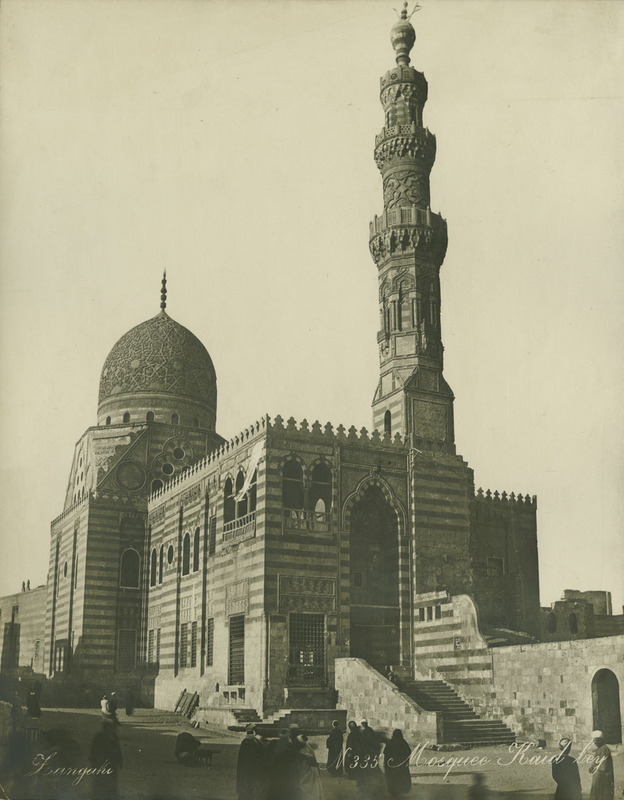
Kaïd Bey Mosque, Cairo

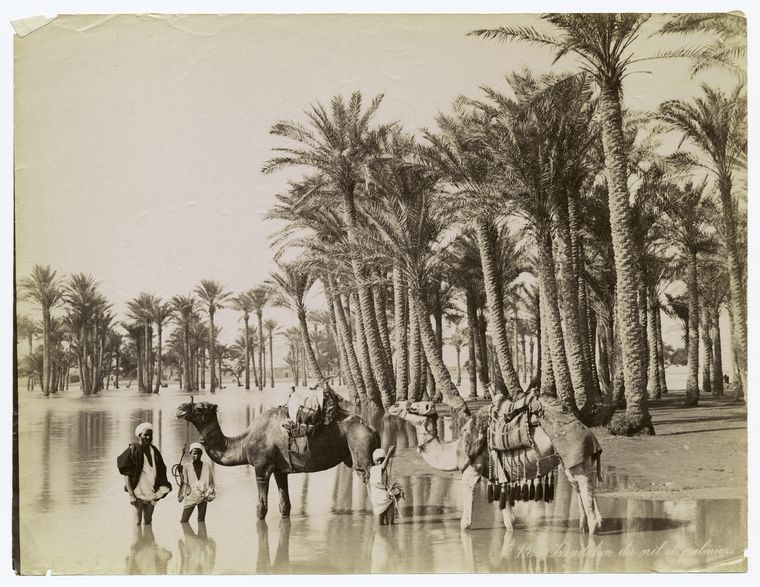
Inundated scene on the Nile

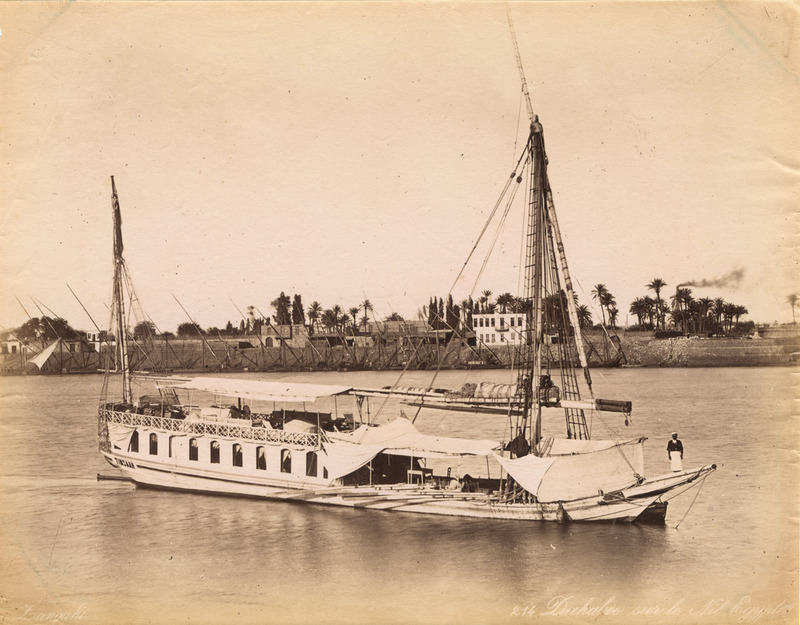
Nile boat (Dahabeah)

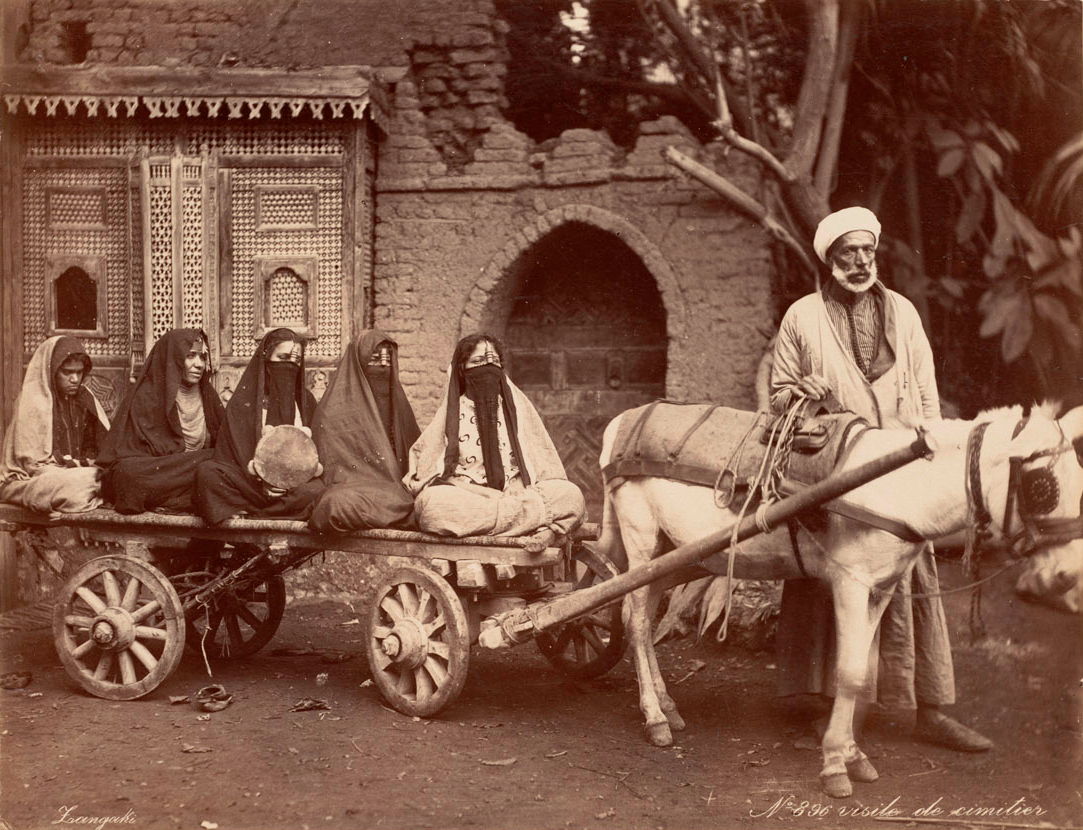
Egyptian family with servants

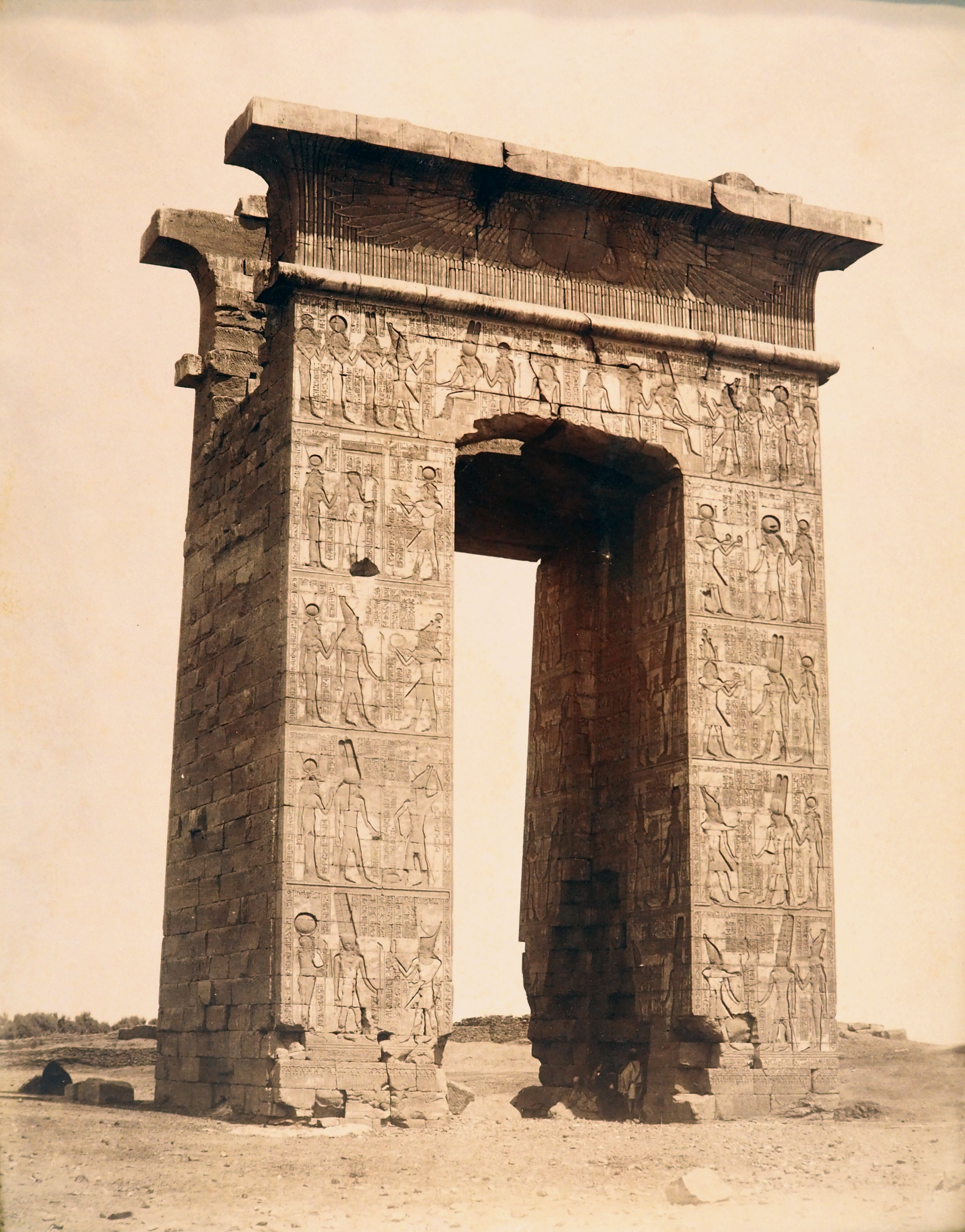
Karnak, Gate of Ptolemy III

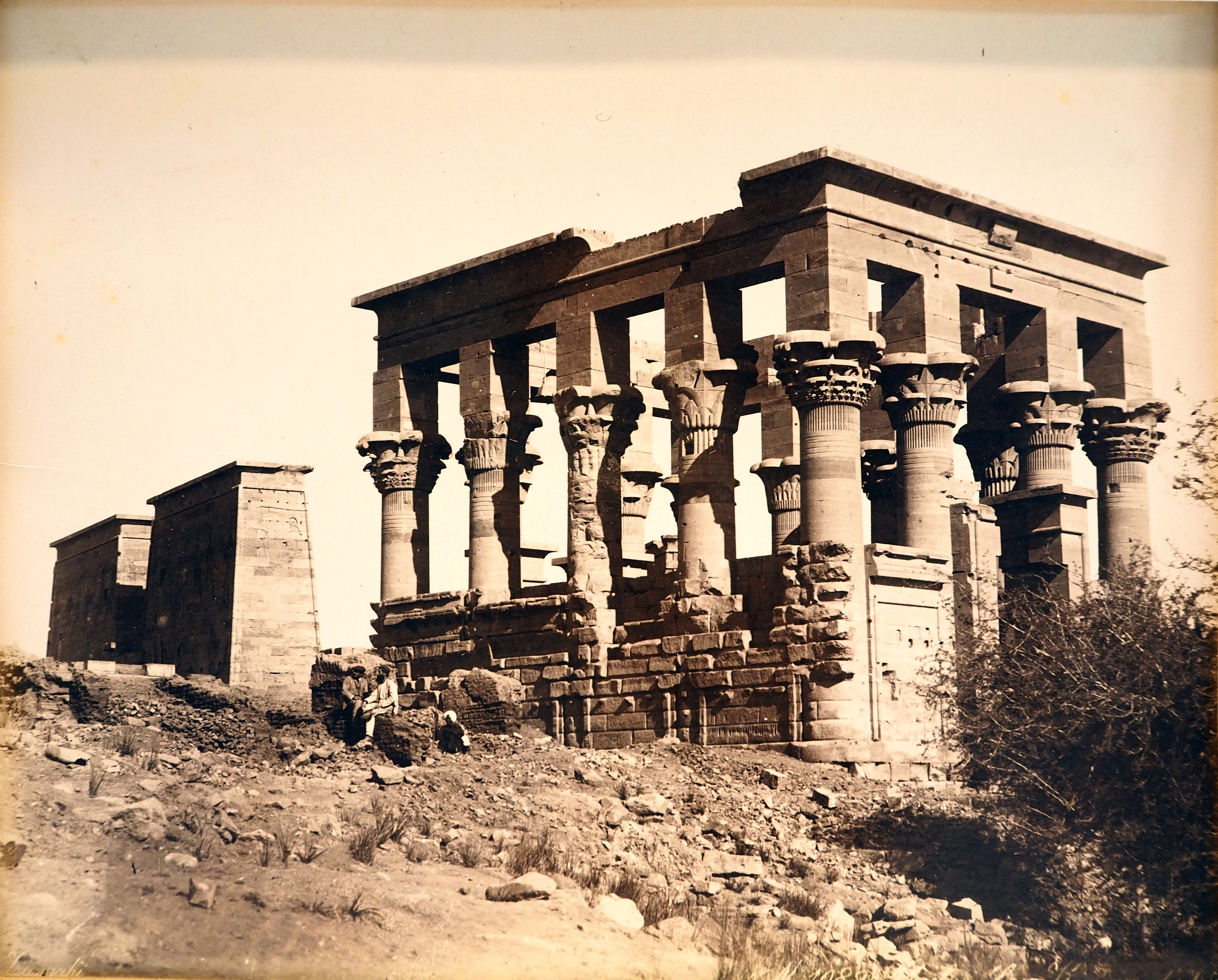
Philae Island

== See also ==
- History of Photography
- List of Orientalist artists
- Orientalism
