= William Henry Harrison Seeley =

First American recipient of the Victoria Cross (1840–1914)

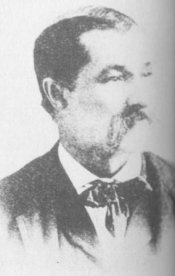
- Born: May 1, 1840; Topsham, Maine, US
- Died: October 1, 1914 (aged 74); Dedham, Massachusetts, US
- Burial place: Evergreen Cemetery, Stoughton, Massachusetts
- Military career
- Allegiance: United Kingdom
- Branch: Royal Navy
- Service years: 1862–1866
- Rank: Ordinary seaman
- Units: HMS Euryalus
- Conflicts: Taiping Rebellion; Bombardment of Kagoshima; Shimonoseki campaign
- Awards: Victoria Cross; China Medal

William Henry Harrison Seeley, VC (May 1, 1840 – October 1, 1914) (Note: His birth date is variously described as being either May 1, 20 and 30, 1840. His birth date of May 1, 1840, is on his headstone, whereas May 20 and 30, 1840 are variously described in newspapers of the time. The date on his headstone is used in this page.) was an American sailor who served in the British Royal Navy during the Taiping Rebellion, the Bombardment of Kagoshima and the Shimonoseki campaign and was a recipient of the Victoria Cross for his actions during the Shimonoseki campaign, the highest award for gallantry in the face of the enemy that can be awarded to British and Commonwealth forces. He was the first American recipient of the Victoria Cross, the 28th member of the Royal Navy to earn the award and was, at the time, the only foreigner to have received it.

== Early life ==
Seeley was born on May 1, 1840, in Topsham, Maine, to Dayton A. Seeley and Lucy J. Seeley (née Johnston). He became a dock labourer in the 1850s. A family squabble led to him running away at the age of 14, joining the complement of a British merchant ship – the Salem – which was docked in Boston, Massachusetts, at the time. When Seeley was asked how he came to join the Royal Navy during an interview with The Brunswick Record in 1904, he said;

"You see I was a lad aboard the merchantman Salem – a British ship, although she was built down in Maine. And 'twas in Boston that I shipped. Well, we were in Hong Kong on the Fourth of July. The captain, knowing I was a Yankee and dead set to get ashore and celebrate – that's the very home of fire-crackers, you know – set his foot down and put me at holy-stoning. So I deserted – jumped overboard and swam ashore. After I'd worked off all my native enthusiasm and burnt up all my cash – which wasn't much – I found the only port open to me was to enlist in the British Navy."

During a voyage aboard the Salem he saved the ship's carpenter, Bill Sharp, from drowning by diving overboard after him. He spoke of the incident during the interview, saying; "You see, Bill was tinkering up the bow, and was washed overboard. He wasn't much on swimming so I jumped in and they pulled us both out. That's all."

== Royal Navy service ==
Seeley, then approximately 22, joined the Royal Navy as an ordinary seaman on board the HMS Euryalus in 1862, which was then operating under the East Indies and China Station. The Euryalus was a fourth-rate wooden-hulled screw frigate. The Euryalus had landed in Hong Kong that year to contribute sailors to the 570-strong naval brigade assisting the Great Qing's Imperial Army during the Taiping Rebellion; this brigade often supported the Ever Victorious Army, commanded at the time by Charles George Gordon.

During the interview with The Brunswick Record, Seeley said of serving under Gordon "I served in China under Chinese Gordon, and was with him at Ming Poo, when he drove Li Huang Chang out of camp at the point of a pistol. He was bound to be boss, was the general, and he wouldn't stand for the pig-tailed heathen coming round to tell him how to run things."

== Background ==
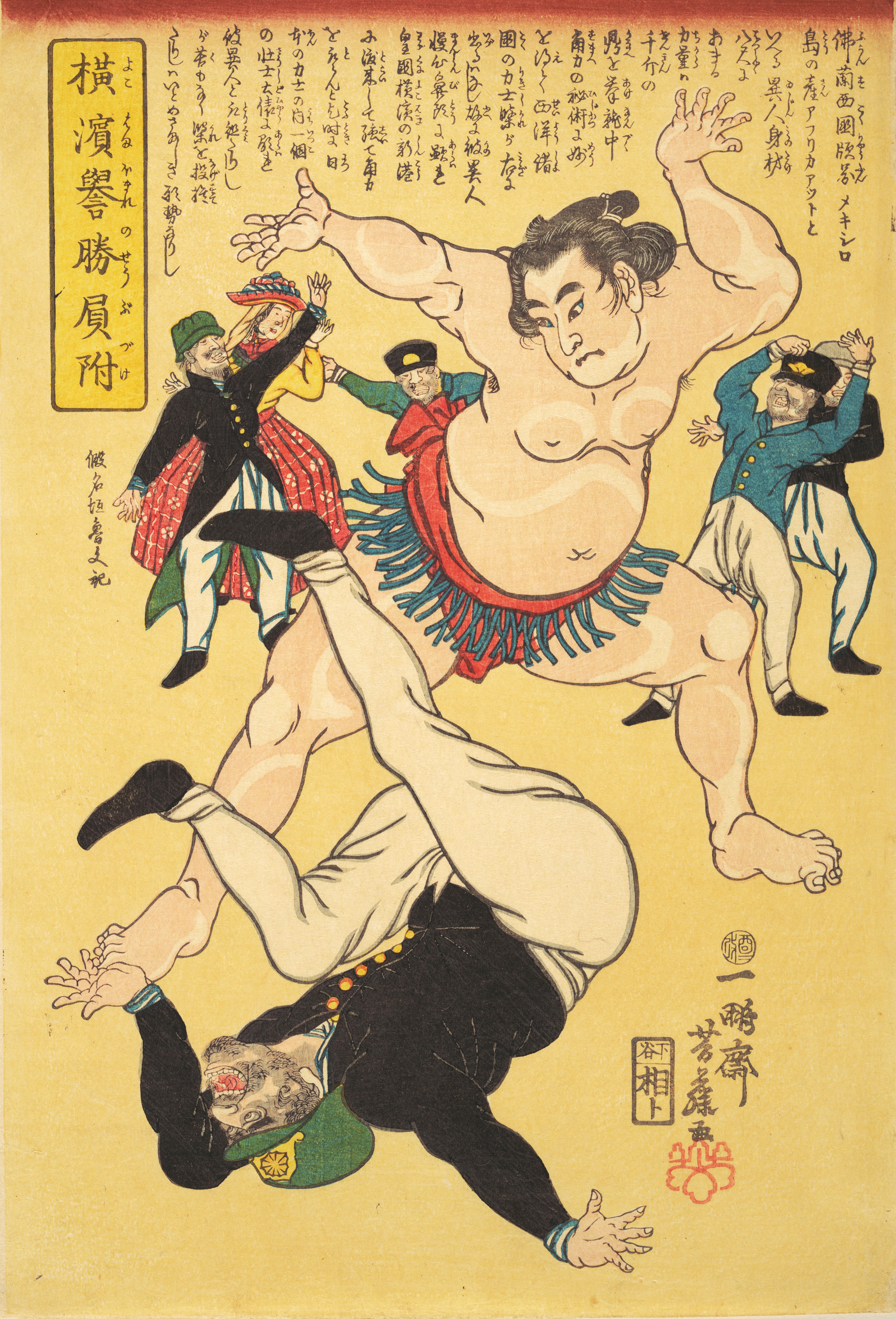
An 1861 image expressing the Joi (攘夷, "Expel the Barbarians") sentiment

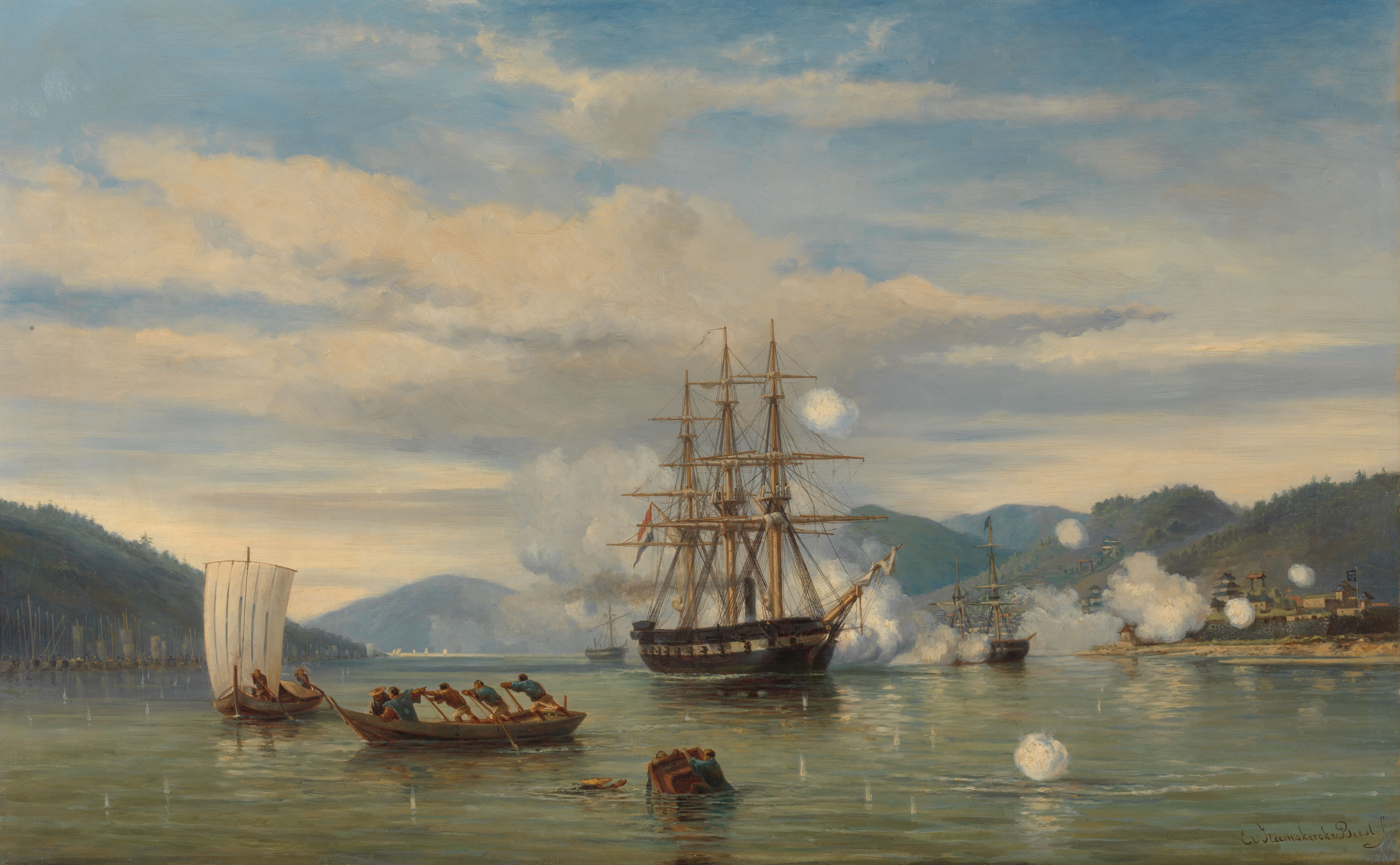
The Medusa forces its way through the straits, by Jacob Eduard van Heemskerck van Beest

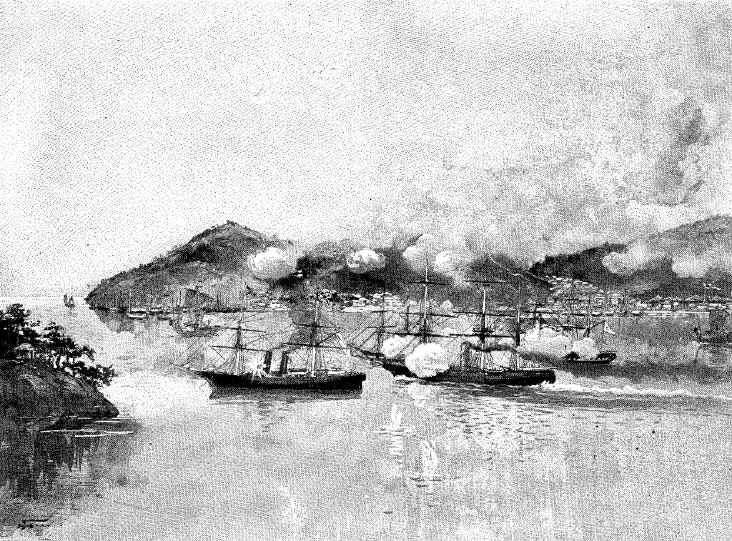
The USS Wyoming battling in the straits against the Choshu steam warships Daniel Webster, Lanrick and Lancefield

Tensions were rising in Japan prior to 1863, with several incidents being perpetrated against foreigners relating to the sonnō jōi faction, a faction that wished to isolate Japan again. Some of these incidents included the attack on the British consulate in Tōzen-ji, Edo by warriors from the Mito Domain in July 1861, the killing of one and wounding of two other British merchants in September that year by warriors from the Satsuma Domain and the attack and burning of another British consulate that was under construction at the time in Shinagawa, Edo in January 1863 by warriors from the Chōshū Clan.

Due to these incidents, the Emperor Kōmei issued the order to expel barbarians, an imperial edict which aimed to isolate Japan again. The Shōgun at the time, Tokugawa Iemochi, went to Kyoto to request an audience with the Emperor. The result of this audience was that the order to expel would be put into practice two months later on June 25 that year. Many of the Chōshū, including their daimyo Mōri Takachika, supported this, declaring that after the deadline all foreign ships traversing the Straits of Shimonoseki were to be attacked. These straits separate the islands of Honshū and Kyūshū, providing a passage between the Seto Inland Sea and the Sea of Japan. Following the deadline, several western ships were attacked, including a US merchant steamer, a French aviso and a 16-gun Dutch warship, resulting in the deaths of four Dutch sailors and the wounding of five Dutch and four French sailors.

The US and French navies retaliated, with the frigate USS Wyoming sailing into the straits on July 16 under the sanction of Minister Robert H. Pruyn, sinking two ships and inflicted some 40 casualties, suffering severe damage in the process. On July 20, Admiral Benjamin Jaurès sailed into the straits with his flagship, the screw frigate Sémiramis, and the aviso Tancrède. 250 marines came ashore and occupied the shore batteries with little resistance, tossing most of the guns and supplies left by the rebels into the sea; they occupied the emplacements until July 24, destroying nearby military camps and burning a local village. Despite the retaliatory attacks, the US steamer Monitor was attacked while awaiting refuelling from a nearby town later in July.

Diplomatic channels between all involved countries opened in attempts to reopen the straits, with the British Minister to Japan, Sir Rutherford Alcock, Dutch Minister Dirk de Graeff van Polsbroek and Pruyn discussing the feasibility of a joint strike against Takachika and his forces. Takachika requested additional time to respond to the treaty partners' demands, which was deemed to be unacceptable.

== The Bombardment of Shimonoseki ==
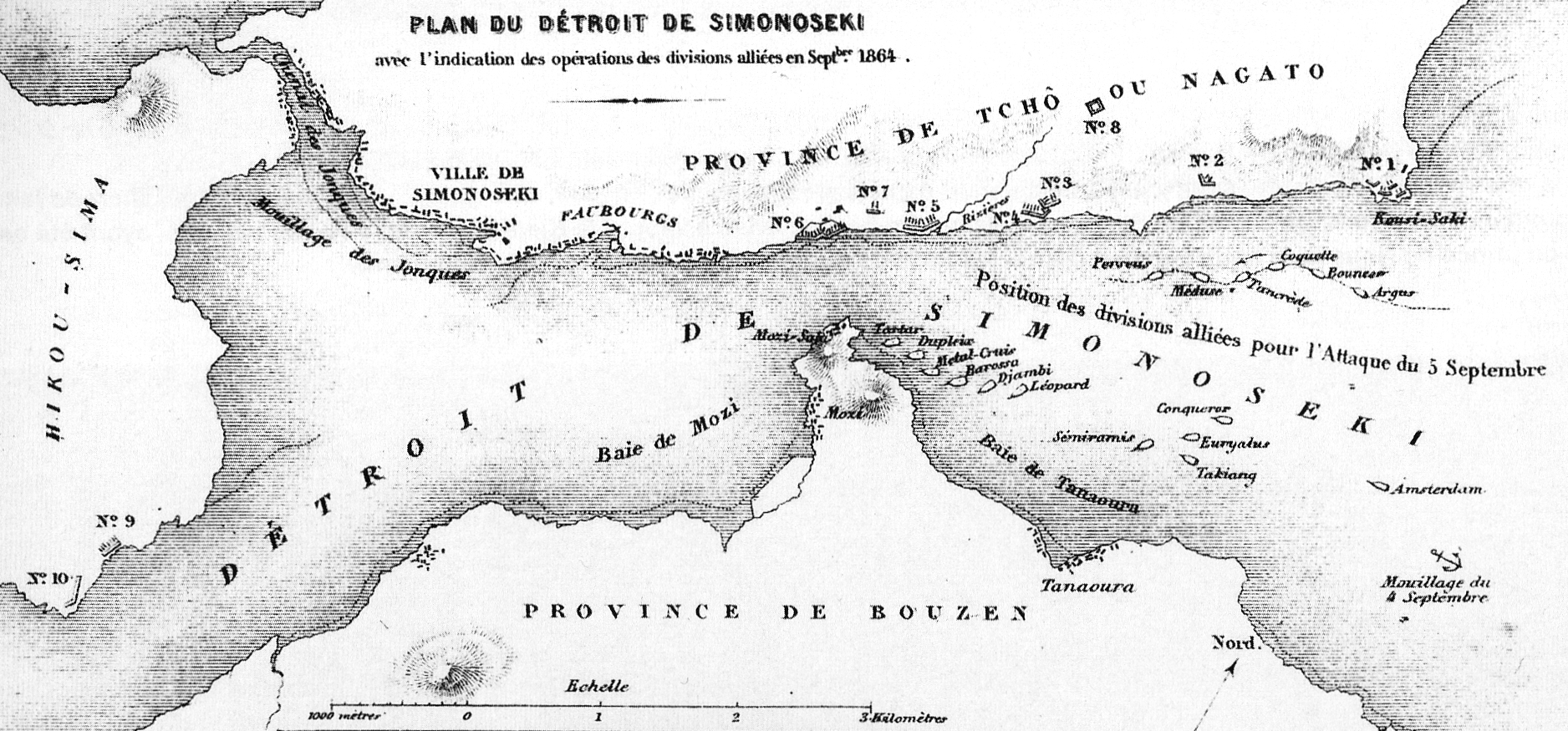
Map of the allied attack on Shimonoseki, in September 1864

On August 17, 1864, a squadron consisting of nine British (including the Euryalus), four Dutch (including the Medusa, the 16-gun warship that was attacked) and three French warships, crewed by 3,000 sailors and a further 2,000 mainly British soldiers, all under the command of Admiral Sir Augustus Kuper of the Royal Navy, steamed out of Yokohama to open the straits. Kuper took command from the deck of the Euryalus.

The only US warship in the area at the time was the sail-powered sloop-of-war USS Jamestown, which could not overcome the strong currents of the straits and thus could not join the expedition. As such, Minister Pruyn and then Captain Cicero Price chartered the steamer Ta-Kiang from Walsh, Hall and Company. Under the terms of the agreement, she was "to carry a landing party, and in every way to assist in the common object, but not to be under fire of the forts." The Ta-Kiang would later assist the squadron by towing boats and receiving the wounded. The full squadron of 17 ships had 388 guns and 7,542 men between them.

The battle took place between September 5–6, 1864, with the bombardment taking place on September 5. Aimed at taking out the shore batteries, the fleet utilised their guns' range advantage, battering the shore batteries and fortifications. The bombardment lasted for approximately one and a half hours. Despite the bombardment, fire from the shores recommenced at approximately six o'clock the next morning. The allied fleet once again silenced the guns and prepared to begin landing soldiers on the coast in order to silence the batteries and destroy their ammunition stores. In the afternoon a landing party consisting of 1,350 British, 350 French, and 200 Dutch soldiers landed on the shore and began their assault. Seeley and his shipmates were assigned to the 3rd Company.

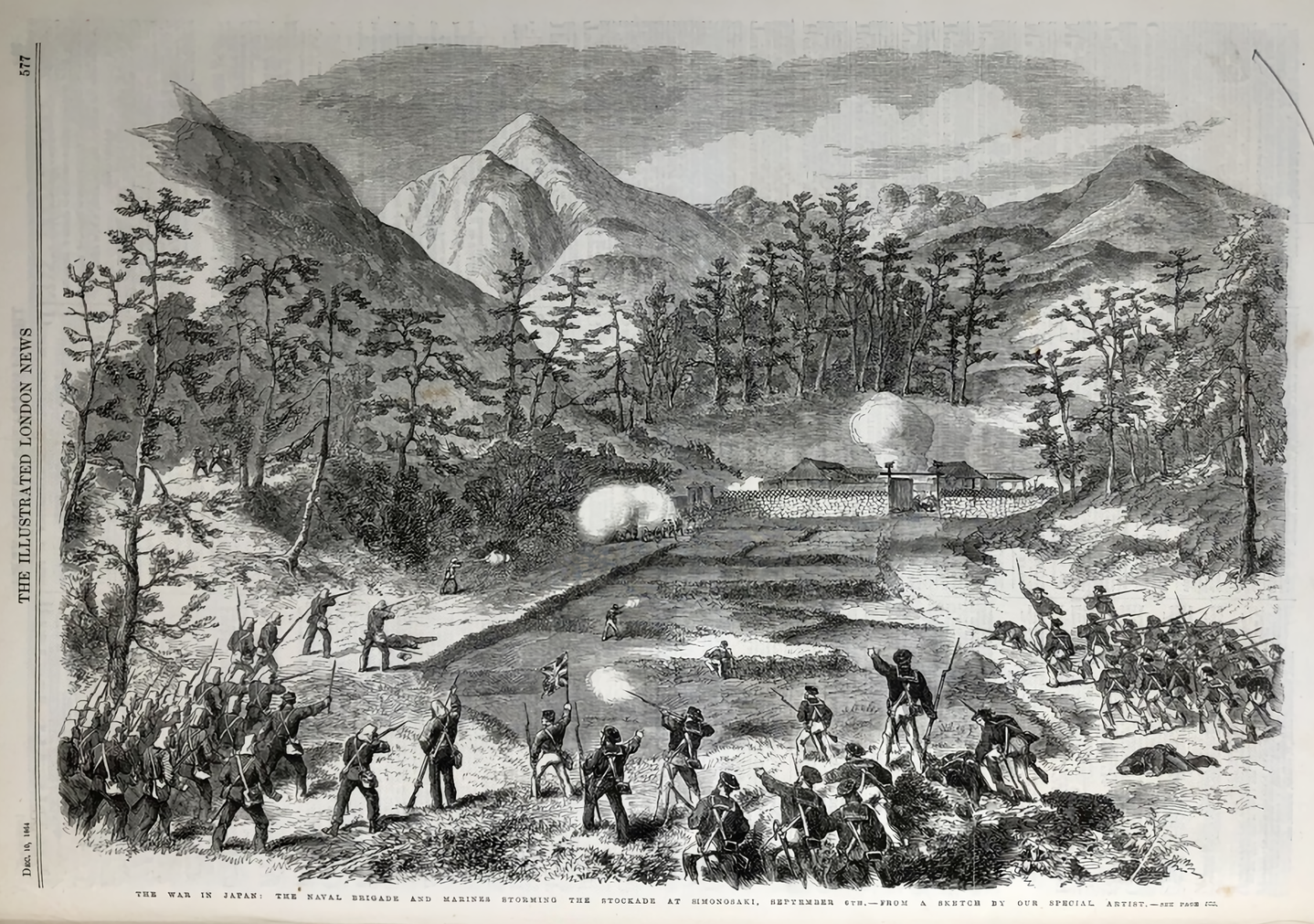
The British naval brigade and marines storm the stockade at Shimonoseki, The Illustrated London News, December 1864

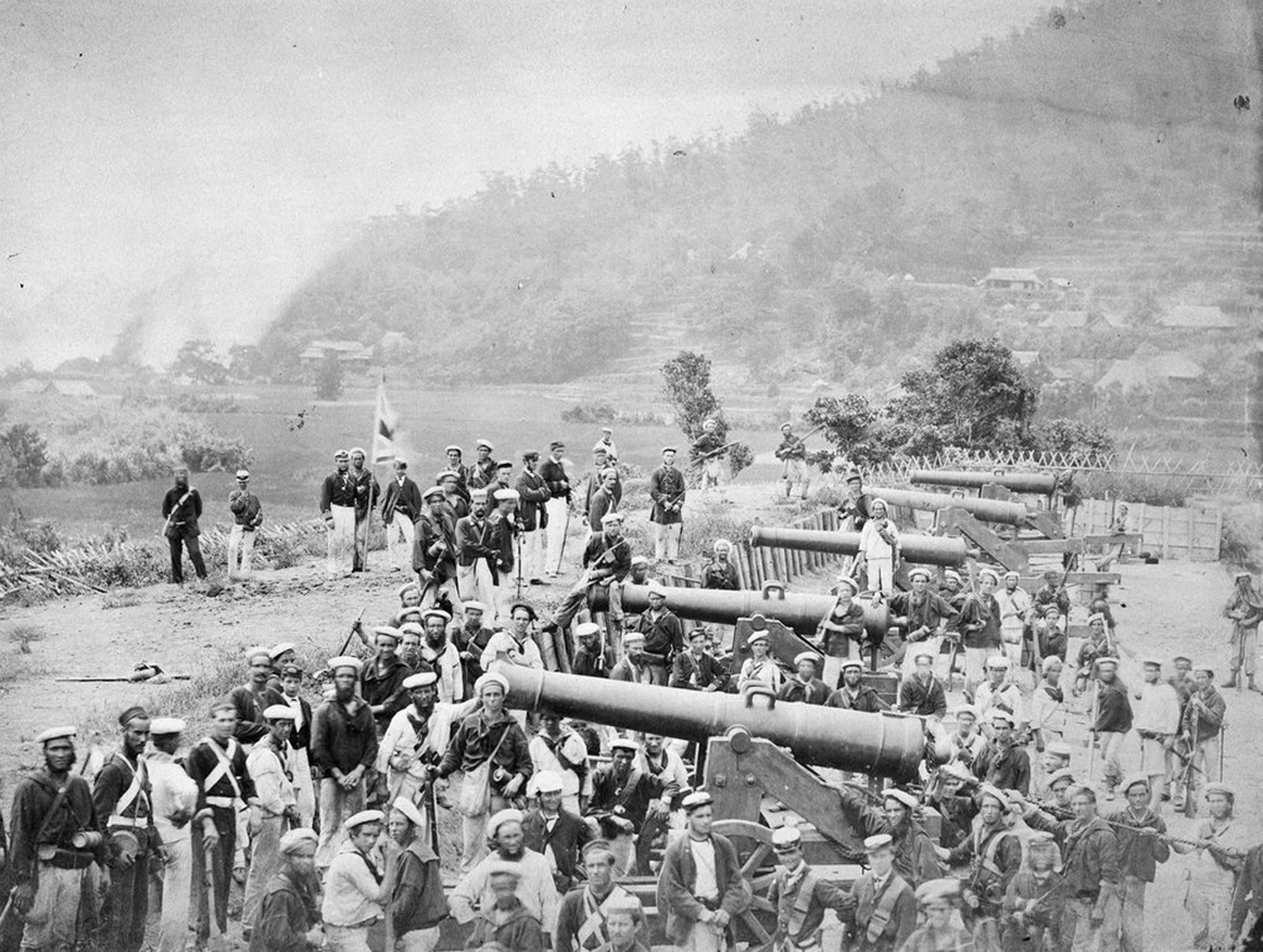
Capture of a Chōshū battery at Shimonoseki. Albumen silver print by Felice Beato, 1864

Seeley volunteered to reconnoitre the enemy's positions, locating a stockade manned by the enemy. He was discovered by them, and, in the ensuing pursuit, he received an injury to his right arm by grape shot. Despite this injury, he would deliver a coherent report to his company commander, Second Lieutenant Frederick Edwards, and join his fellow soldiers in the assault on the stockade.

Seeing the British advance the rebels fell back to the stockade, which was manned by 300 men, seven light guns and protected by an 8 ft (2.4 m) palisade. At the head of the assault was the colour party. One of the colour sergeants was mortally wounded, while the second, petty officer Thomas Pride, was hit in the left side of his chest by a musket ball. When they returned to the rear, it was discovered that the colour that Duncan Gordon Boyes had carried was "six times pierced by musket balls."

Captain J. H. J. Alexander was wounded in the ankle by a musket ball, falling to the ground. Upon seeing this, Seeley said he immediately rushed to get him out of range, walking about a quarter of a mile with Alexander on his back. Seeley later said of the incident;

I just picked him up like I had many a bag of potatoes down in Sagadahoc County, and pretty soon we were out of harms way. The captain was a fine feller and never a thought I gave of the Cross in getting him away from the rebs bullets.

== Aftermath and Victoria Crosses ==
The London Gazette would later report on dispatches received from Kuper, stating "Since the conclusion of these operations I have satisfied myself, by personal examination, of the entire Straits, that no batteries remain in existence on the territory of the Prince of Choshiu, and thus the passage of the Straits may be considered cleared of all obstructions."

Also in these dispatches, Captain J. H. J. Alexander would report that "2nd. Lieutenant Frederick Edwards, commanding the third company, has called my attention to the intelligence and daring exhibited by William Seeley, ordinary seaman, in ascertaining the enemy's position, and afterwards, when wounded in the arm in the advance, continued to retain his position in the front."

Seeley would be taken to Portsmouth to recover from his injuries. Pride, Boyes and Seeley would all be awarded the Victoria Cross for their courageous actions during the battle. They were presented the awards under much fanfare on September 22, 1865, at Southsea by Admiral Michael Seymour. Seeley lost his Victoria Cross twice between then and 1889.

On the first occasion he had it stolen from him "in the Lord Howe Tavern, London, soon after I quit the British service in '66, and was finding that the cross weren't any help for getting a feller another berth. I hunted for it, but there was never a trace of it for three months. Then it was sent to Whitehall anonymous."

On the second occasion he had it stolen when he returned to Boston. It was discovered in a gutter by Mr. J. W. Grady, who at that time was just a young boy. At the time he had no idea what it was or what the significance of it was. He thought nothing of it for several years before learning what it was; as the owner could not be found, he kept hold of it despite several offers of $100 to buy it as he believed he had no right to sell it. Some 15 years after he found it, a friend of his showed him a copy of the Boston Evening News dated January 23 that had a page story about Seeley, titled "Only American Citizen to Win Victoria Cross".

As the story had Seeley's name in it, he sent a message to Seeley at once to tell him how he found his Victoria Cross. During the correspondence between them, Seeley described the cross in great detail. Satisfied he had found the rightful owner, Grady sent it back to Seeley. One of Seeley's messages was printed in the paper, which read;

"Dear Sir: I received your favor of the 6th and was surprised, for I supposed that I had lost the original cross in the docks in East Boston when I was going aboard a ship. I got a miniature cross in London which was the one I spoke of losing but it was returned to me once from the admiralty office and found at a curio shop. The one you have is no doubt the original one presented to me, which I won in 1864, which I would be pleased to have back once more, and will pay charges, if any, and come and see you next summer. I would be much pleased to meet you and show you returned friend you have had for so long."

During his interview with The Brunswick Record, Seeley said of the Victoria Cross;

"It is an [honour], right enough, but it hasn't helped me to earn my bread and butter – though 50 pounds a year ain't to be sneezed at, of course. There are men who have had the V.C. and died in the poor house – though that may have been their own fault. But as for me, I'd rather have the berth of skipper in Uncle Sam's merchant service than all the crosses in John Bull's navy – and that's 30 all told. And I'd 'a' been [sic] there, if the Jap bullets hadn't knocked me out!"

== Later life and death ==
Seeley later returned to Massachusetts, marrying Mary E. Moore on October 1, 1900, with whom he ran a small farm on the line between Sharon and Stoughton until his wife's death at the farm. He then moved in with his son, George G. Seeley, in Dedham, Massachusetts.

He died there aged 74 on Thursday October 1, 1914, and was buried three days later in Evergreen Cemetery, Stoughton. As Seeley's name was not placed on his grave following his burial, the grave site went unrecognised until 2009 when funds were raised for the instalment of a memorial plaque.

His granddaughter was the last keeper of his Victoria Cross, with it going missing in 1943.
