= Jean-Baptiste Henri Durand-Brager =

French painter

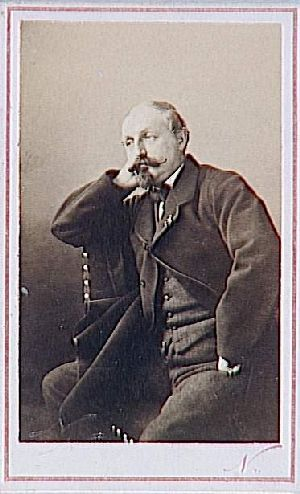
- Portrait of Henri Durand-Brager
- Born: 21 May 1814; Dol-de-Bretagne, France
- Died: 25 April 1879 (aged 64); Paris, France
- Education: Gudin and Eugène Isabey,
- Known for: Painter and photographer
- Movement: Orientalism

Jean-Baptiste Henri Durand-Brager (1814–1879) was a French painter, noted for his marine scenes and Orientalist works.

== Life and career ==
Jean-Baptiste Henri Durand-Brager was born at Dol in Brittany in 1814. He studied under Gudin and Eugène Isabey.

He was a naval officer who rose to the rank of captain. In 1840, he accompanied the fleet which repatriated Napoleon's remains from St. Helena, and the island afforded him subjects for various paintings. He spent much of his time travelling: He went to Buenos Aires with the squadron, Montevideo in 1841–42 aboard a French warship, and explored Uruguay and Brazil; he accompanied the expeditions to Tangiers and Mogador, and to Madagascar. He painted views of the places he visited, and also naval combats and sea-pieces.

In the 1850s, Durand-Brager was in the Crimea during the war with Russia, where he turned his hand to photography as well as painting. He was one of about fifteen photographers, including Felice Beato, Roger Fenton and James Robertson, who photographed soldiers, barracks, camp life and battlefields and were the first to record a major war on film. Later, he returned to Constantinople where he made photographs of the landscape, monuments and the people.

He was a versatile painter, producing naval scenes, genre works, costumbrismo works, landscapes and works with Orientalist themes. There are several of his works in the galleries of Versailles.

Durand-Brager died in 1879.

== Gallery ==
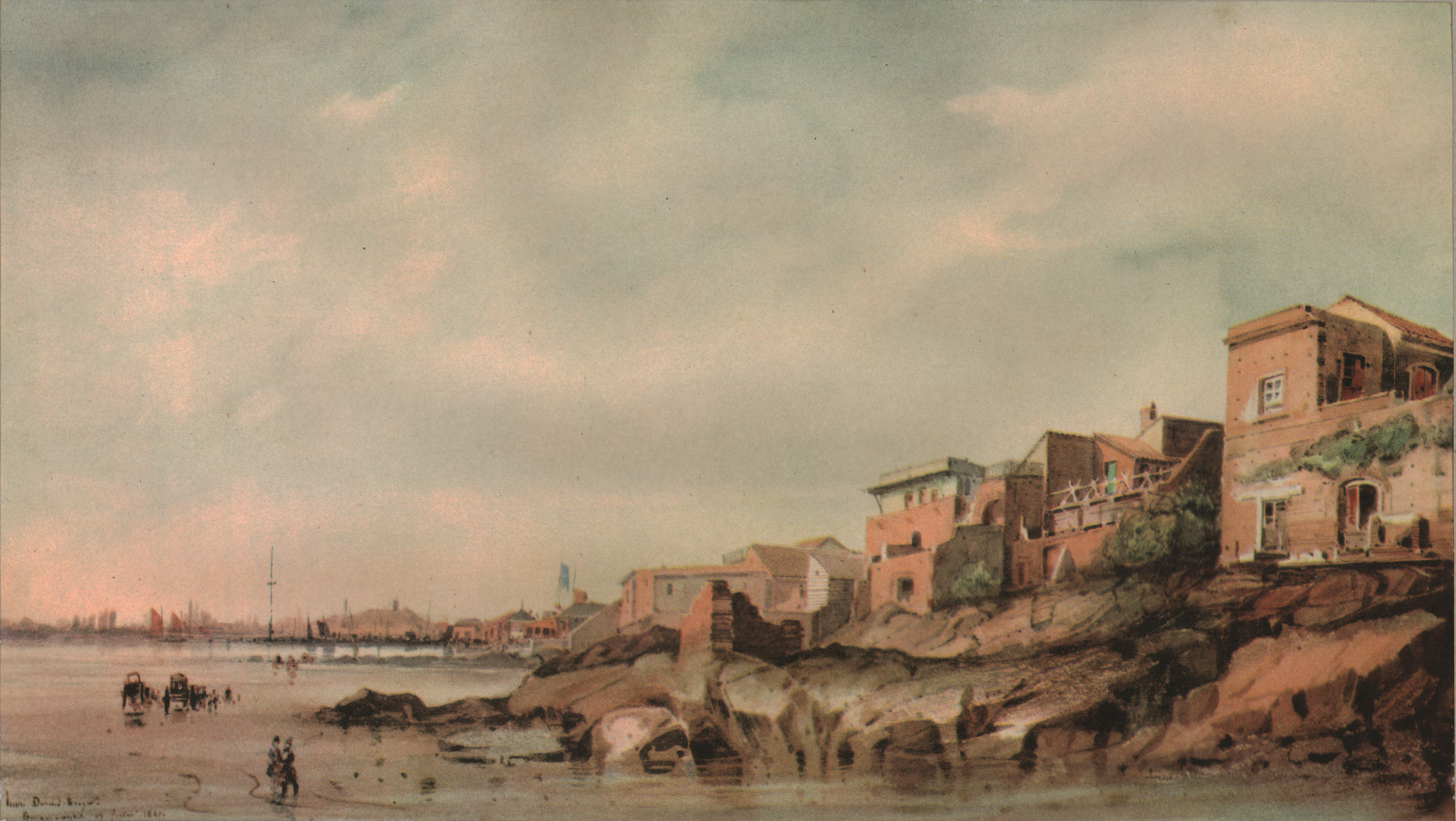
Vista de Buenos Aires, 1841, now in the National Academy of History of Argentina

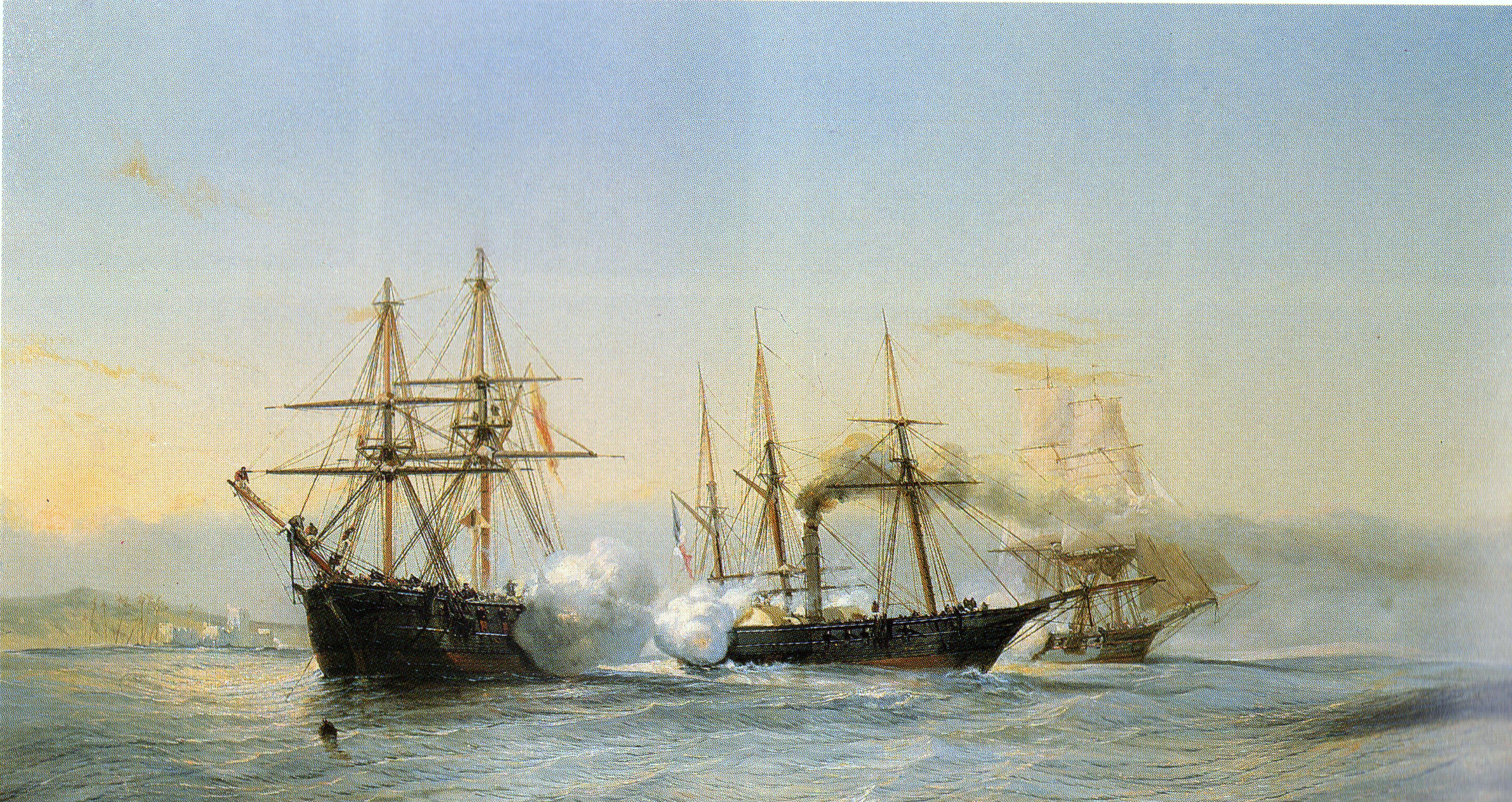
Naval combat near Mogador, Morocco, ca. 1845

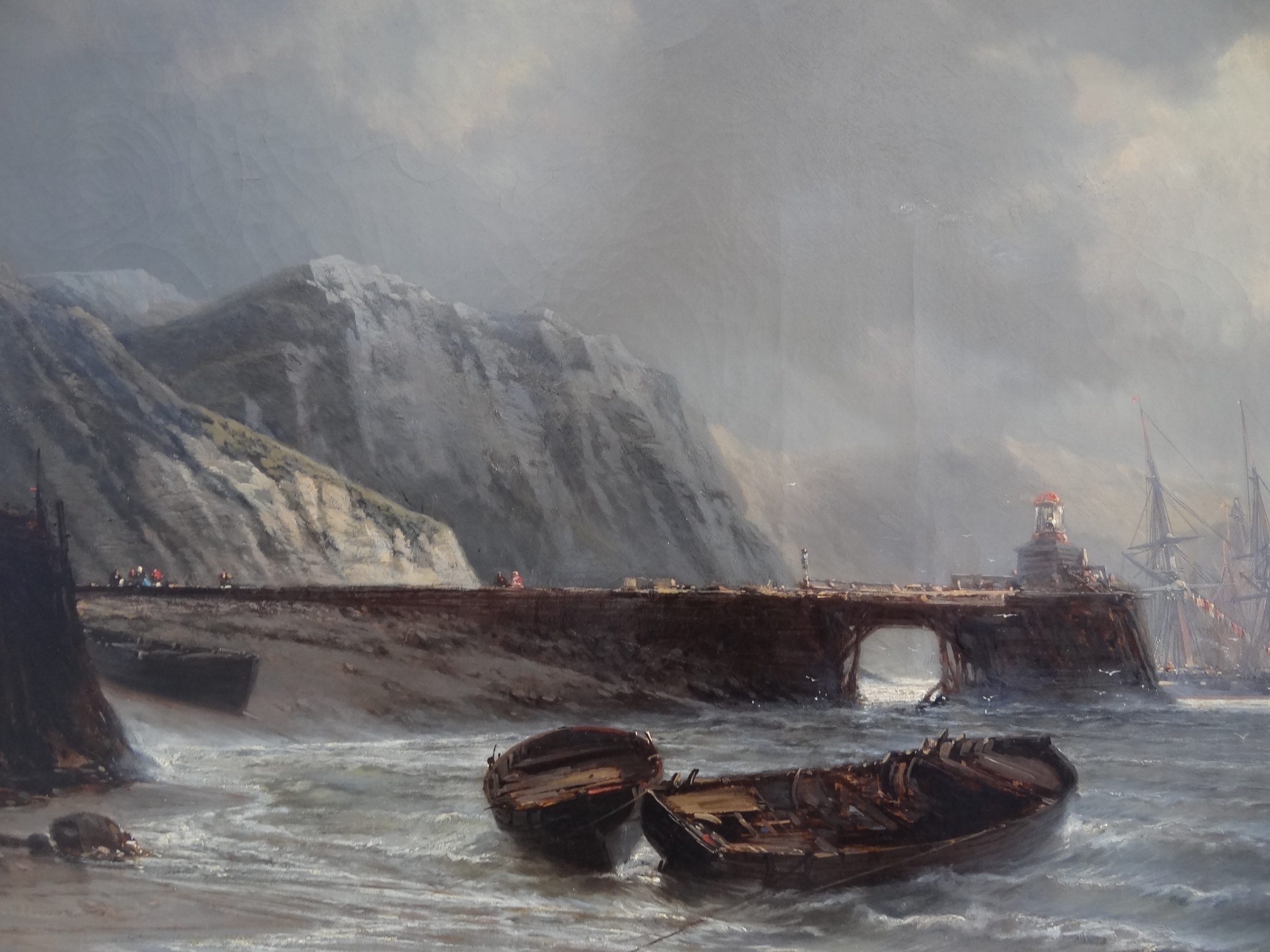
Marine, 1860

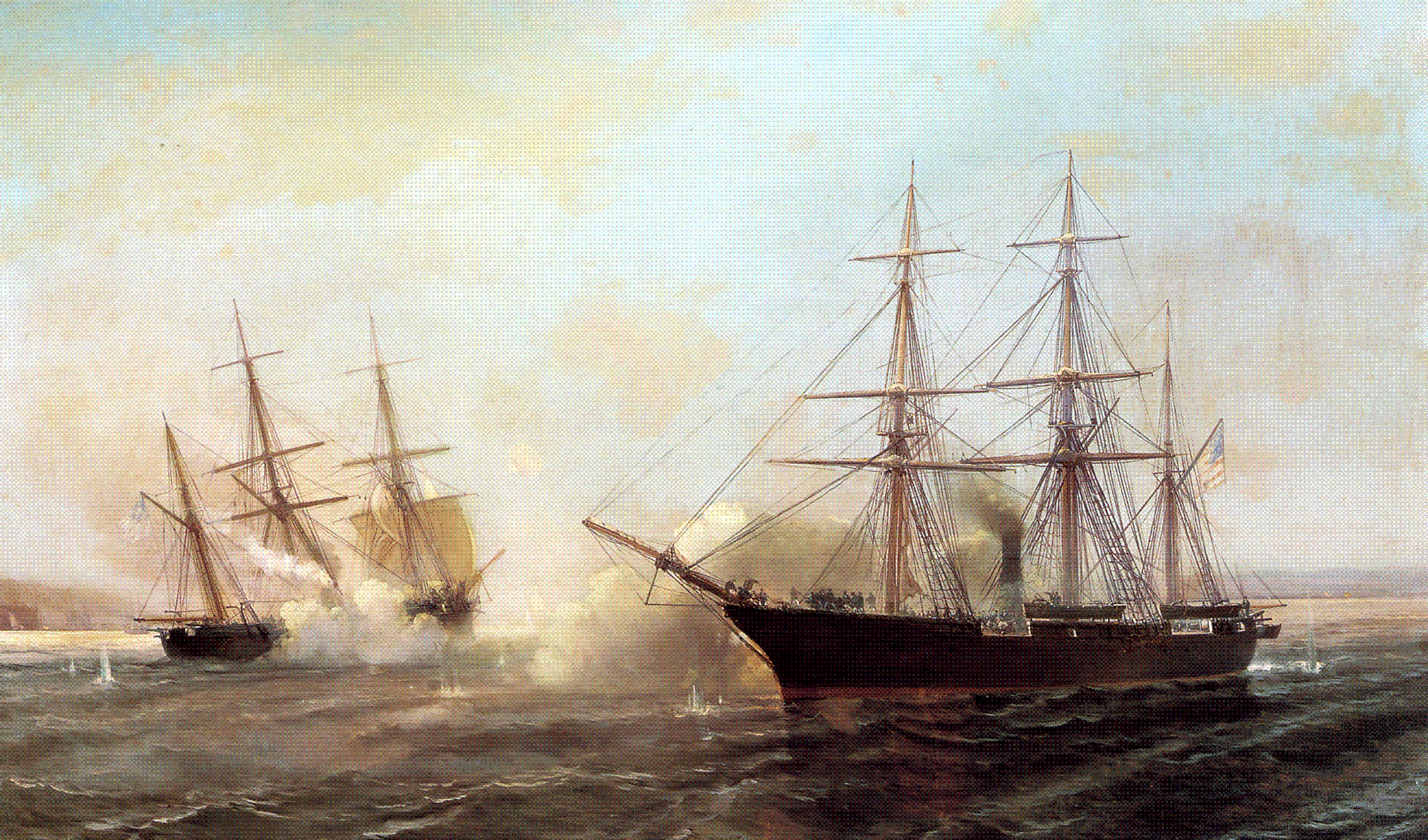
Battle of the USS Kearsarge and the CSS Alabama, 1864

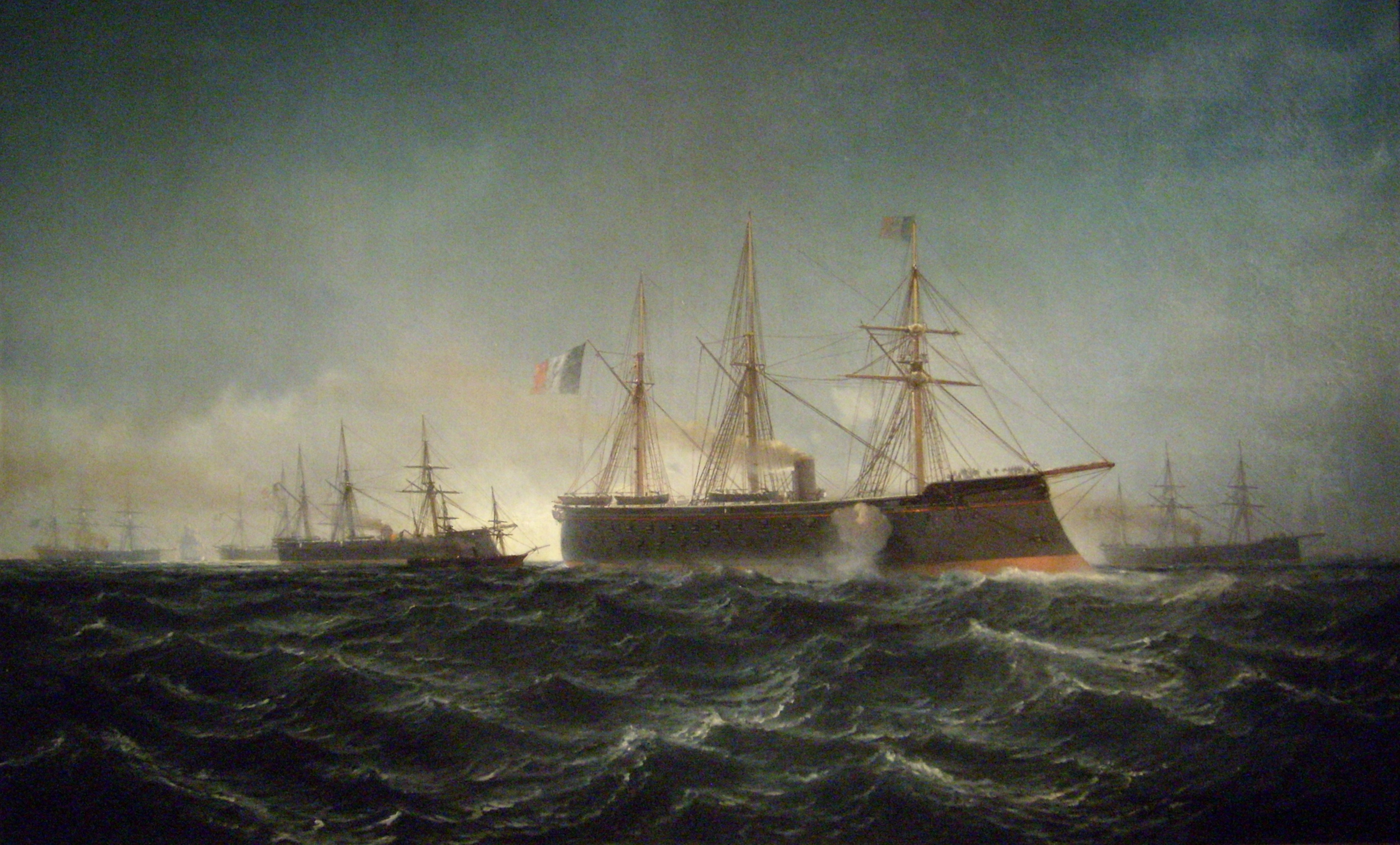
The Magenta, 1864, now in the Musée Thomas-Henry

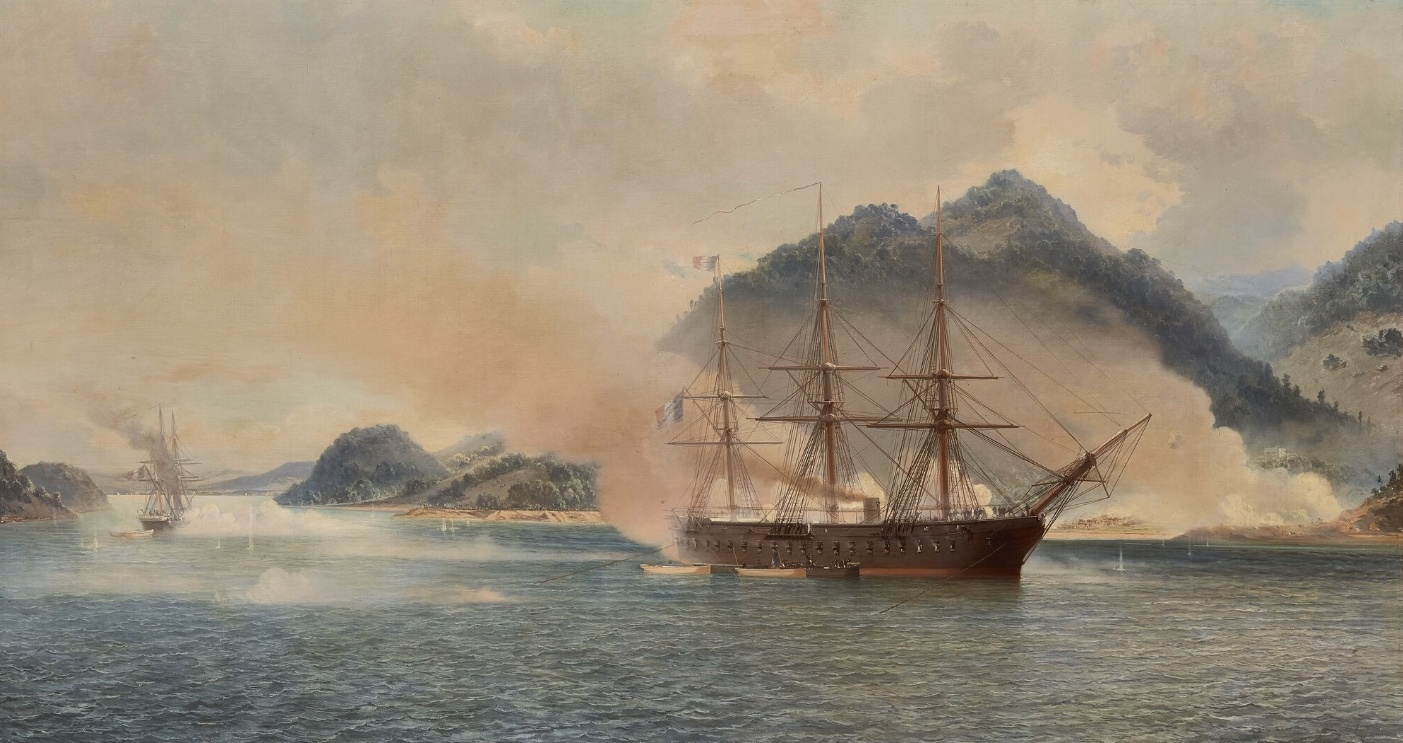
Tancrède and Dupleix at the Bombardment of Shimonoseki July 1863, 1865

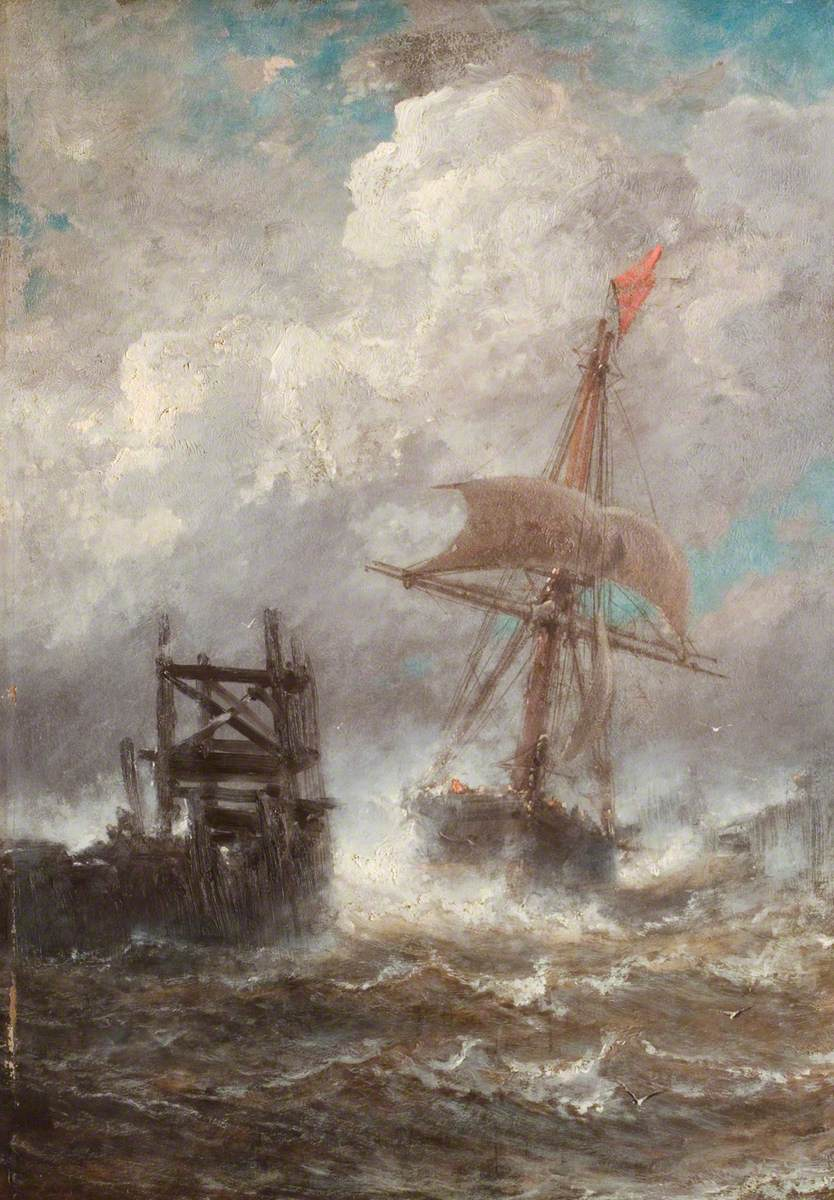
Seascape with a Ship, 1870, now in the Herbert Art Gallery and Museum

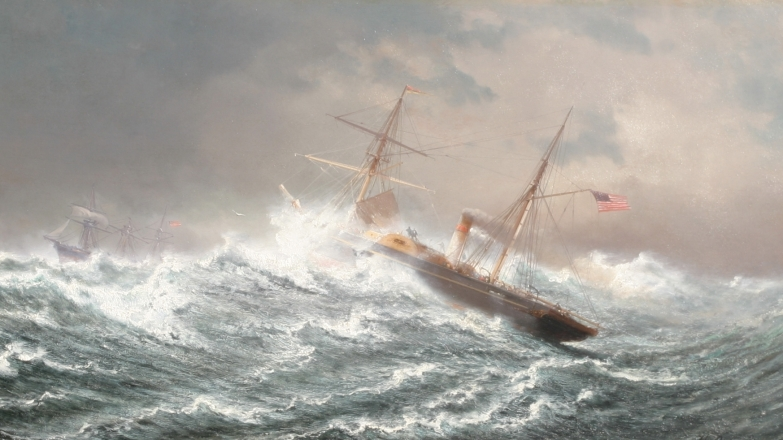
The American paddle steamer "De Ruyter" to the rescue, 1873

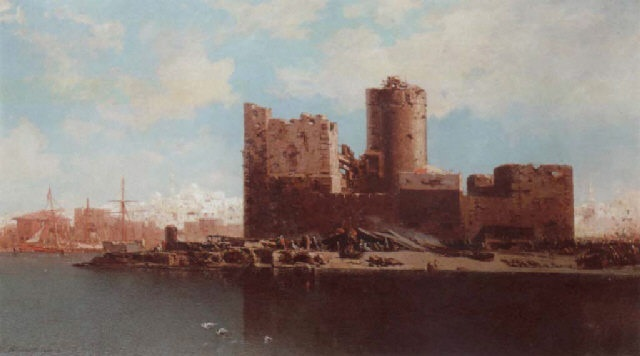
Trabzon, Turkey (no date)

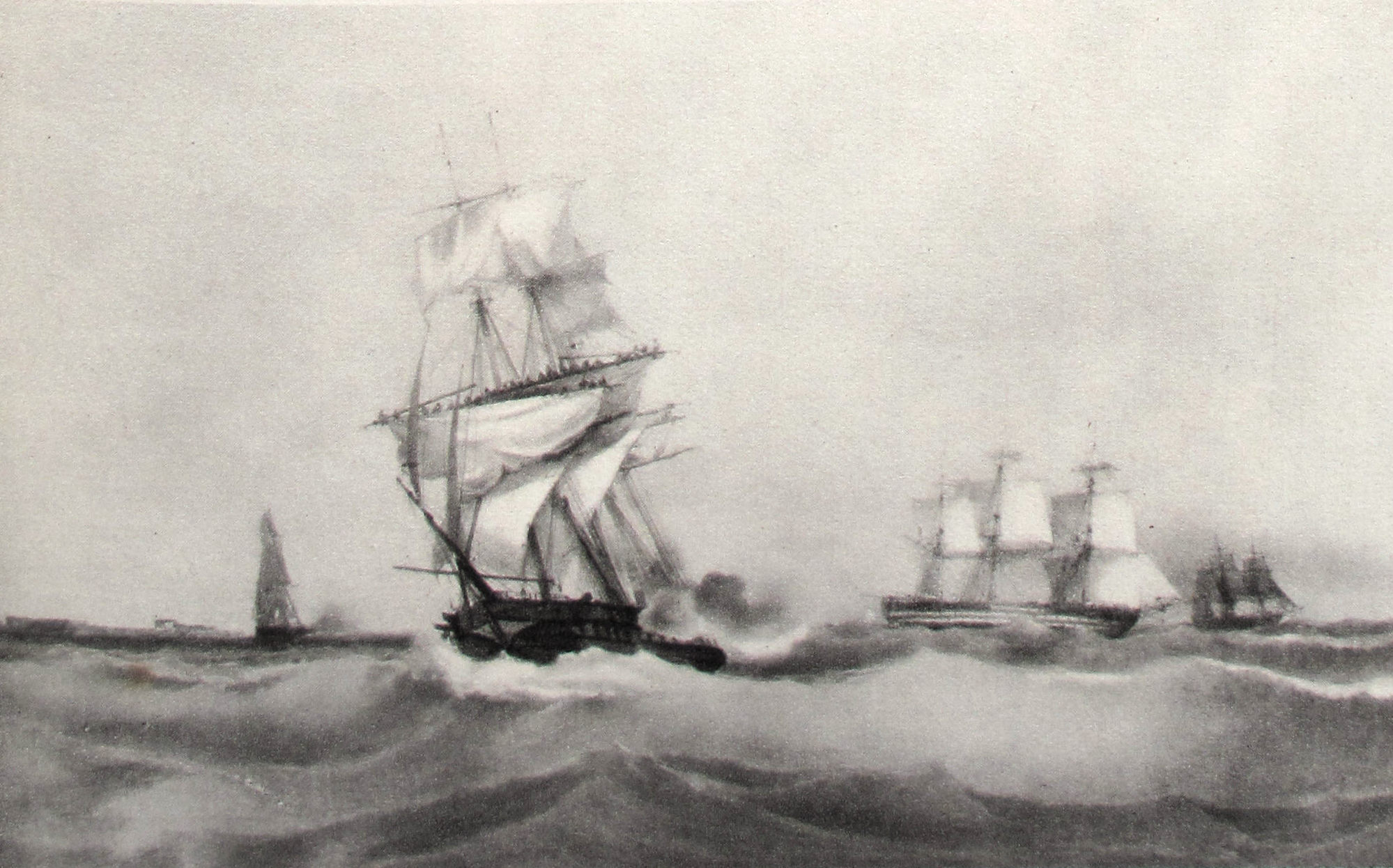
French frigate Africaine (no date)

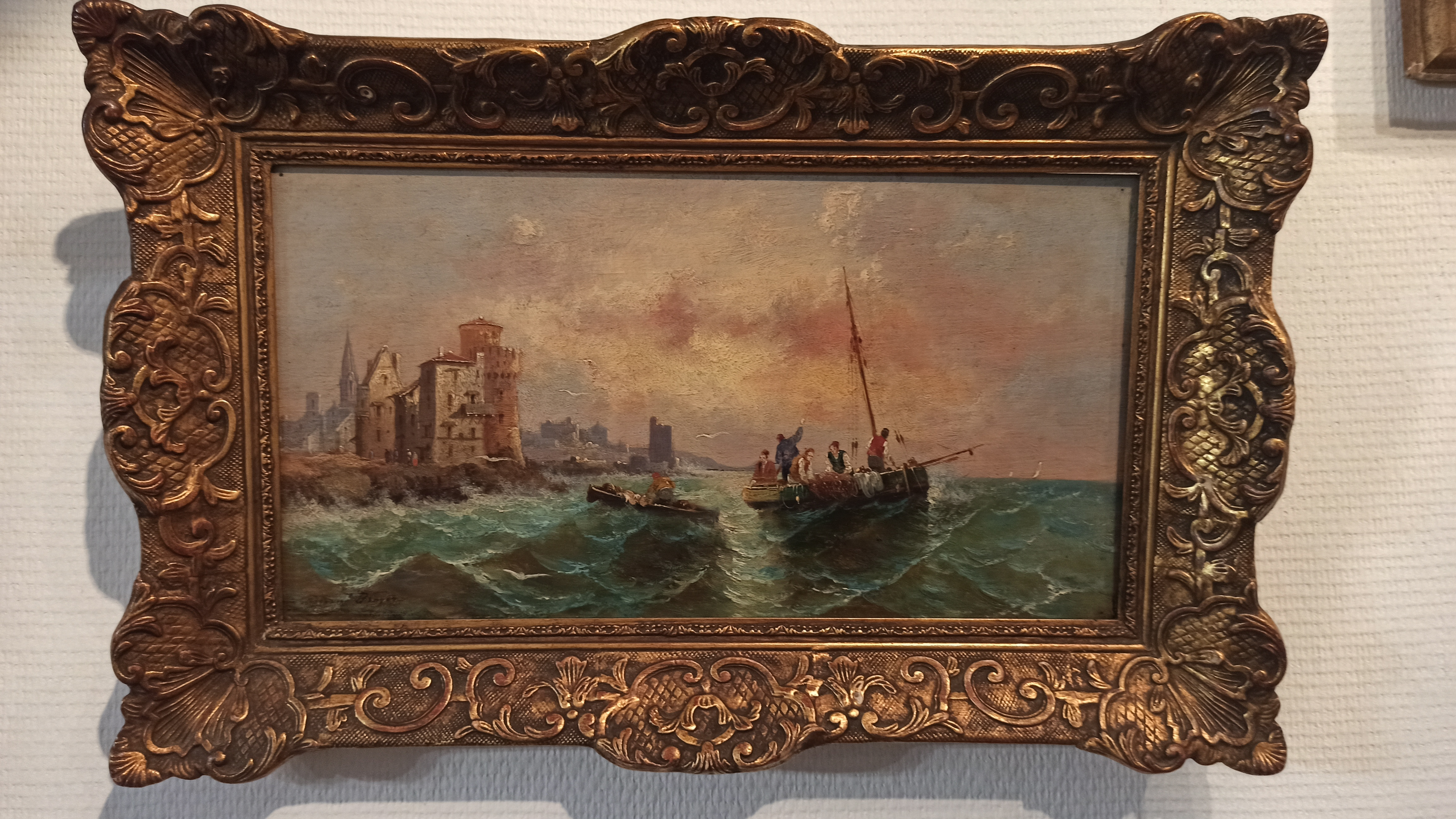
A painting by Durand-Brager in a private collection in Poland, 52x33 cm

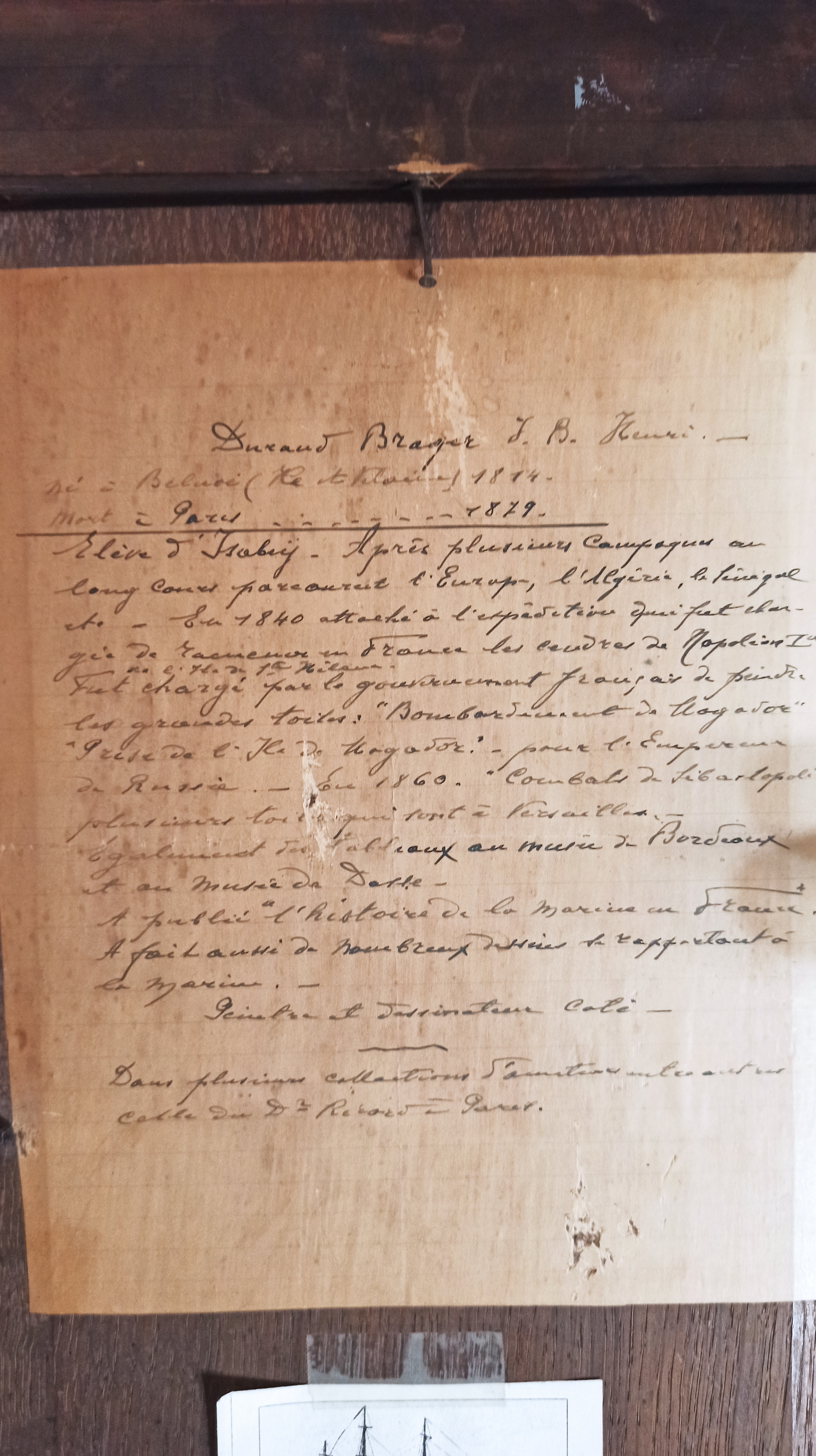
Information on the back of the painting in the private collection in Poland

== See also ==
- List of Orientalist artists
- List of artistic works with Orientalist influences
