= Shimonoseki campaign =

Series of military engagements in 1863–1864 between Japan and Western Powers

- Part of the Bakumatsu conflicts
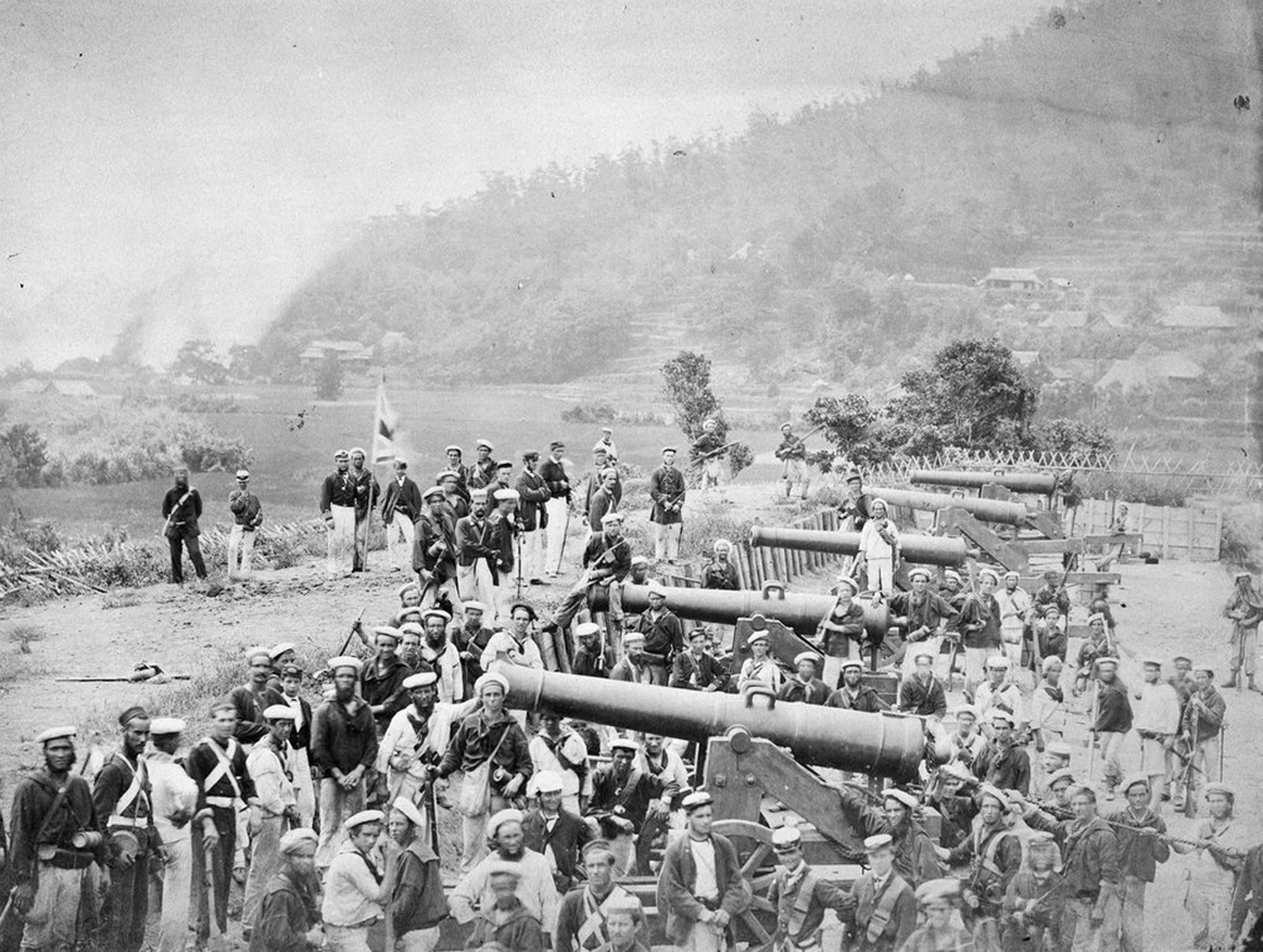
- Capture of a Choshu battery at Shimonoseki by British sailors and marines; picture taken by Felice Beato
Date	16 July – 14 August 1863 (3 weeks and 4 days); 5–6 September 1864 (1 day)
Location	Shimonoseki, Japan
Result	Allied victory

Belligerents
United Kingdom; France; Netherlands; United States	Chōshū Domain

Commanders and leaders
(United Kingdom of Great Britain and Ireland) Augustus Kuper; (Second French Empire) Benjamin Jaurès; (Kingdom of the Netherlands) François de Casembroot; (United States) David McDougal	(Chōshū Domain) Mōri Takachika; (Chōshū Domain) Mōri Motochika; (Chōshū Domain) Takasugi Shinsaku; (Chōshū Domain) Akane Taketo

Strength
Land: 2,000; Sea: 28 warships	Land: 1,500; 100 artillery pieces Sea: 6 warships 40 war-junks

Casualties and losses
12 killed 50 wounded	18 killed 29 wounded 2 ships destroyed 1 ship damaged 60 cannons captured

The Shimonoseki campaign (Japanese: 下関戦争/馬関戦争, Hepburn: Shimonoseki Sensō/Bakan Sensō; "Shimonoseki War") was a series of military engagements in 1863 and 1864, fought to control the Shimonoseki Straits of Japan by joint naval forces from the United Kingdom, France, the Netherlands, and the United States, against the Japanese feudal domain of Chōshū, which took place off and on the coast of Shimonoseki, Japan.

== Background ==
Despite efforts of appeasement by the Tokugawa shogunate to establish an atmosphere of peaceful solidarity, many feudal daimyōs remained bitterly resentful of the shogunate's open-door policy to foreign trade. Belligerent opposition to European and American influence erupted into open conflict when the Emperor Kōmei, breaking with centuries of imperial tradition, began to take an active role in matters of state and issued on March 11 and April 11, 1863, his "Order to expel barbarians" (攘夷実行の勅命 – Jōi jikkō no chokumei).

The Chōshū clan, under the daimyō Mōri Takachika, began to take action to expel all foreigners after the deadline of the 10th day of the 5th month, according to the traditional Japanese calendar. Openly defying the shogunate, Mōri ordered his forces to fire without warning on all foreign ships traversing Shimonoseki Strait. This strategic but treacherous 600-meter waterway separates the islands of Honshū and Kyūshū and provides a passage connecting the Inland Sea with the Sea of Japan.

Even before tensions escalated in Shimonoseki Strait, foreign diplomats and military experts, notably U.S. Minister to Japan Robert Pruyn and U.S. Navy Captain David McDougal had been aware of the precarious state of affairs in Japan. McDougal wrote a letter to the Secretary of the Navy, Gideon Welles, dated June 12, 1863, stating, "General opinion is that the government of Japan is on the eve of revolution, the principal object of which is the expulsion of foreigners."

=== "Revere the Emperor and expel the barbarians!" ===
The Chōshū clan was equipped with mostly antiquated cannons firing cannonballs, but also some modern armament, such as five 8-inch (203 mm) Dahlgren guns, which had been presented to Japan by the United States, and three steam warships of American construction: the bark Daniel Webster of six guns, the brig Lanrick, or Kosei, with ten guns, and the steamer Lancefield, or Koshin, of four guns.

The first attack occurred on June 25, 1863, soon after the Imperial "Order to expel barbarians" came into effect. The U.S. merchant steamer SS Pembroke, under Captain Simon Cooper, was riding at anchor outside Shimonoseki Strait when it was intercepted and fired upon by two European-built warships belonging to the rebel forces.

The crew of one enemy vessel taunted the frantic American seamen with a loud and unnerving cry: "Revere the Emperor and expel the barbarians!" (尊皇攘夷 sonnō jōi). Under incessant cannon fire, Pembroke managed to get underway and escape through the adjacent Bungo Strait with only slight damage and no casualties.

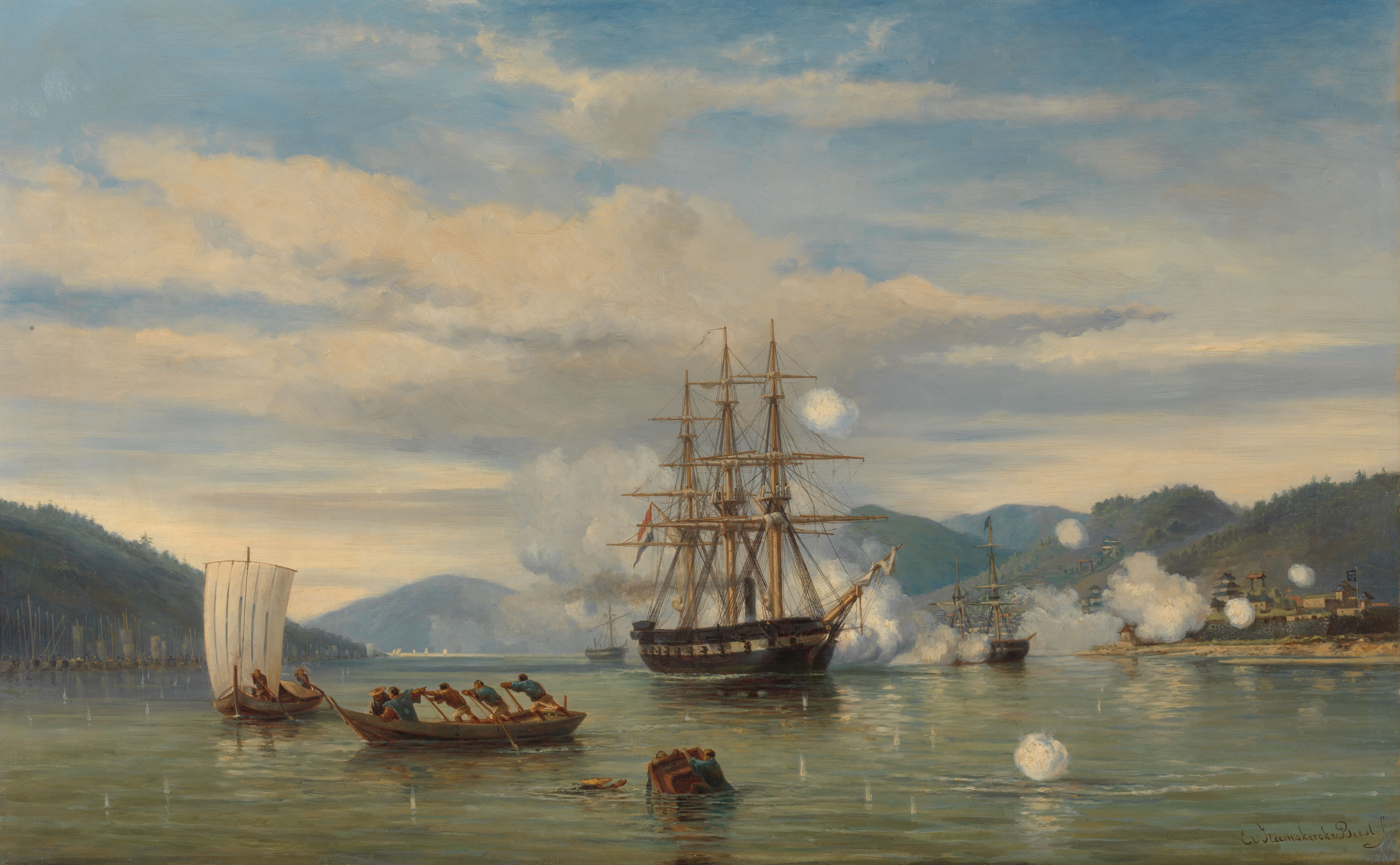
The Medusa forces its way through the Shimonoseki strait, by Jacob Eduard van Heemskerck van Beest

Upon arrival in Shanghai, Cooper filed a report of the attack and dispatched it to the U.S. Consulate in Yokohama, Japan. The next day, the French naval dispatch steamer Kien Chan was also riding at anchor outside the strait, when rebel Japanese artillery atop the bluffs surrounding Shimonoseki opened fire on her. Kien Chan sustained damage to its engine and suffered four casualties before escaping to the open ocean.

On July 11, despite warnings from the crew of the Kien Chan, the 16-gun Dutch warship Medusa cruised into Shimonoseki Strait. Her skipper, Captain François de Casembroot, was convinced that Lord Mōri Takachika would not dare fire on his vessel due to the strength of his ship and longstanding relations between the Netherlands and Japan.

However, Mōri did just that, pounding Medusa with more than thirty shells and killing or wounding nine seamen. De Casembroot returned fire and ran the rebel gauntlet at full speed, fearful of endangering the life of the Dutch Consul General, who was on board. Within a short time, the Japanese warlord had managed to fire on the flags of most of the nations with consulates in Japan.

=== Battle of Shimonoseki Straits ===
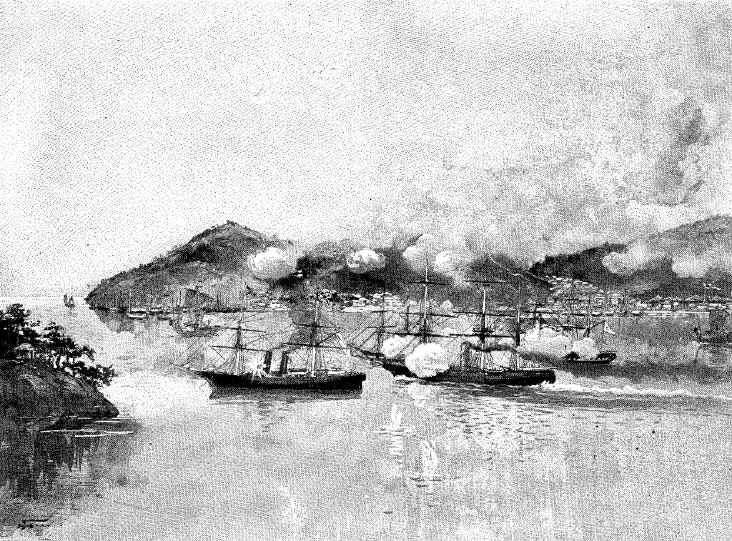
The USS Wyoming battling in the Shimonoseki Straits against the Choshu steam warships Daniel Webster, Lanrick and Lancefield

In the morning of July 16, 1863, under sanction by Minister Pruyn, in an apparent swift response to the attack on the Pembroke, the U.S. frigate USS Wyoming, under Captain McDougal, sailed into the strait and single-handedly engaged the U.S.-built but poorly manned local fleet for almost two hours before withdrawing. McDougal sank two enemy vessels and severely damaged another one, along with inflicting some forty Japanese casualties. The Wyoming suffered a significant amount of damage, with four crew dead and seven wounded, one later dying of his injuries. The two Japanese steamers sunk by the Wyoming were raised again by Chōshū in 1864 and attached to the harbour of Hagi.

== Campaign ==
=== First battle, July 20, 1863 ===
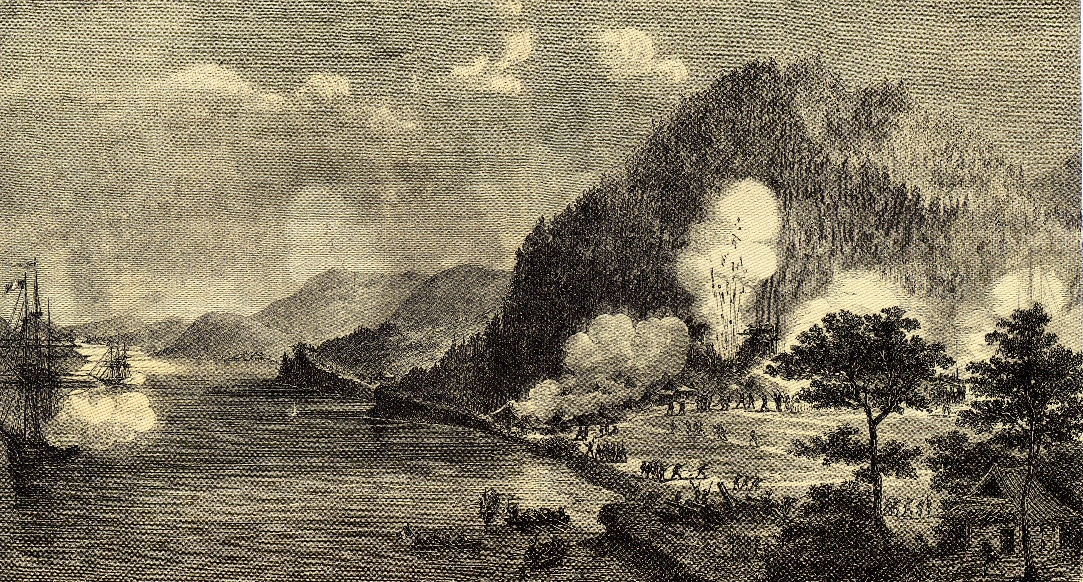
The French engagement at Shimonoseki, with the warships Tancrède and Sémiramis, under Rear Admiral Charles Jaurès. Le Monde illustré, October 10th, 1863.

On the heels of McDougal's engagement, on July 20, the French Navy retaliated for the attack on their merchant ship. The French force consisted of marines and two warships, the aviso Tancrède and the Admiral's flagship, Sémiramis. With 250 men, under Captain Benjamin Jaurès, they swept into Shimonoseki and destroyed a small town, together with at least one artillery emplacement.

The intervention was supported by the French plenipotentiary in Japan, Gustave Duchesne de Bellecourt, but the French government, once informed, strongly criticized their representatives in Japan for taking such bellicose steps, for the reason that France had much more important military commitments to honour in other parts of the world, and could not afford a conflict in Japan. Duchesne de Bellecourt would be relieved from his position in 1864.

Jaurès was also congratulated by the shogunate for taking such decisive steps against anti-foreign forces, and was awarded a special banner.

=== Diplomatic negotiations ===
Meanwhile, the Americans, French, British and Dutch feverishly opened diplomatic channels to negotiate the reopening of the passage to the Inland Sea. Months dragged by with no end in sight to the growing dilemma. By May 1864, various bellicose Japanese factions had destroyed thousands of dollars in foreign property, including homes, churches and shipping. This wanton destruction included the U.S. Legation in Edo, which housed Minister Robert Pruyn.

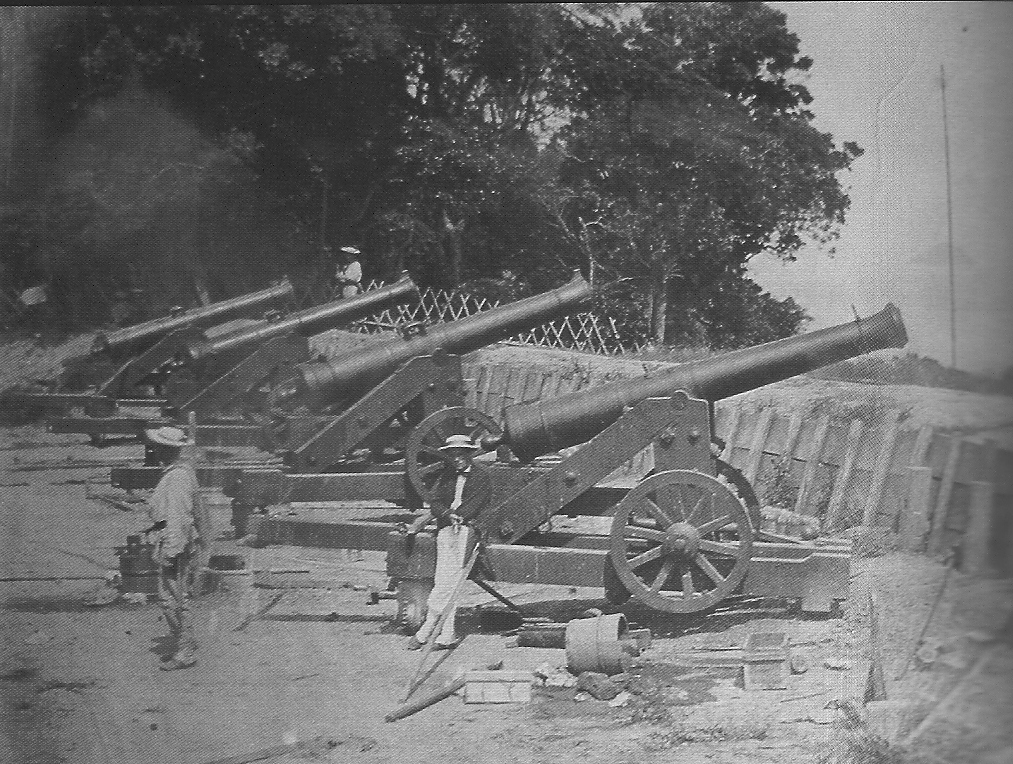
French sailors taking possession of Japanese cannons at Shimonoseki

Throughout the first half of 1864, as Shimonoseki Strait remained closed to foreign shipping, threats and rumors of war hung in the air, while diplomatic efforts remained deadlocked. Then the British Minister to Japan, Sir Rutherford Alcock, discussed with his treaty counterparts such as American Minister Robert Pruyn and Dutch Minister Dirk de Graeff van Polsbroek, the feasibility of a joint military strike against Mōri. They were soon making preparations for a combined show of force. Under the wary eyes of the Japanese, fifteen British warships rode anchor alongside four Dutch vessels, while a British regiment from Hong Kong augmented their display of military might. The French maintained a minimal naval presence, with the bulk of their forces in Mexico trying to bolster Emperor Maximilian's unstable regime.

The U.S., engaged in its Civil War, limited itself to demonstrate diplomatic and minimal military support for the allies. In the meantime, Mōri procrastinated in negotiations by requesting additional time to respond to the Allied demands, a response unacceptable to the treaty powers. The allies decided that the time for united action had arrived. Despite retaliatory action from the treaty powers, another attack occurred in July 1864 when the rebel forces fired upon the U.S. steamer Monitor after she entered a harbor for coal and water. This provoked further outrage, even after a British squadron delivered a multi-national ultimatum to Mōri, threatening military force if the strait was not opened.

=== Final battle, September 5–6, 1864 ===
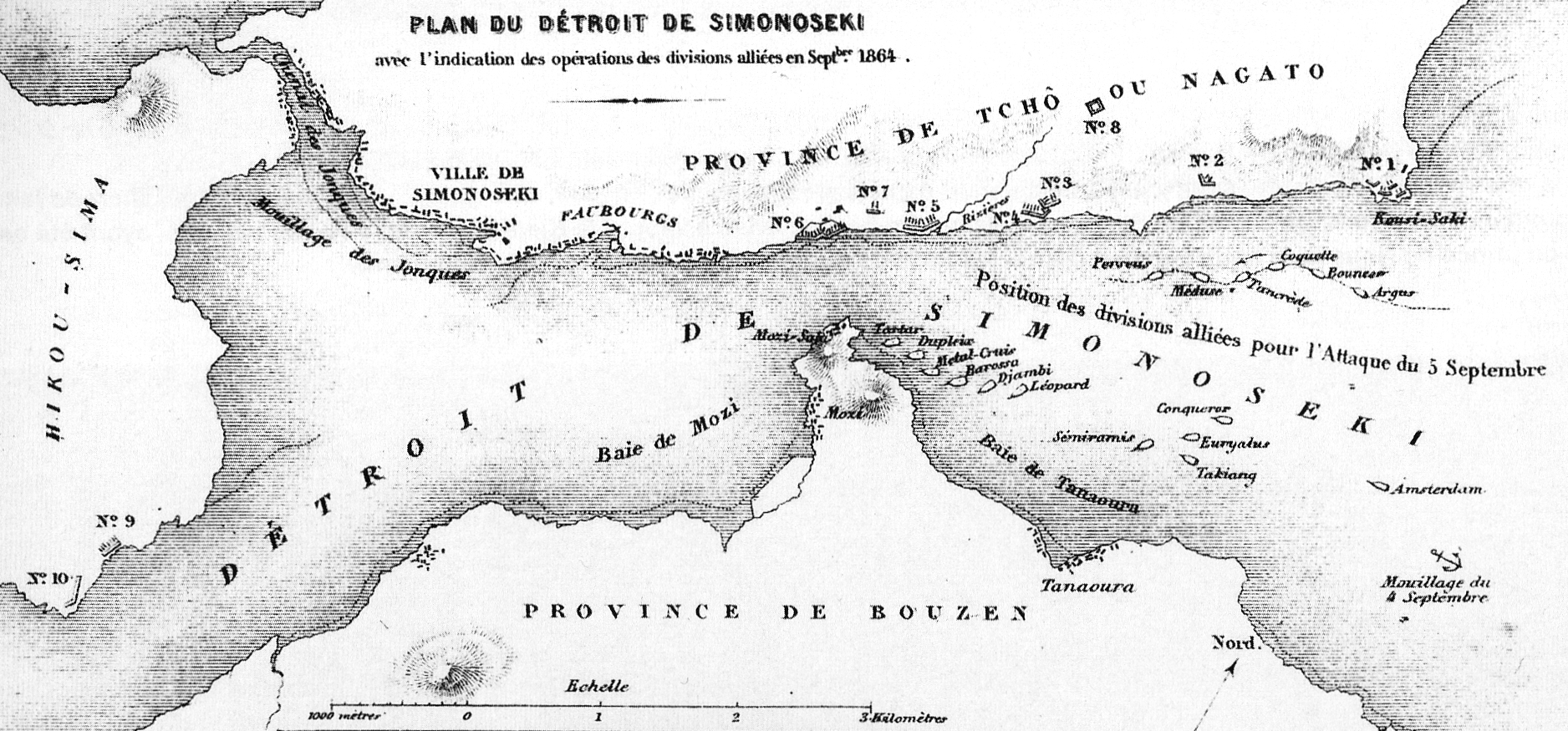
Map of the allied attack on Shimonoseki, in September 1864.

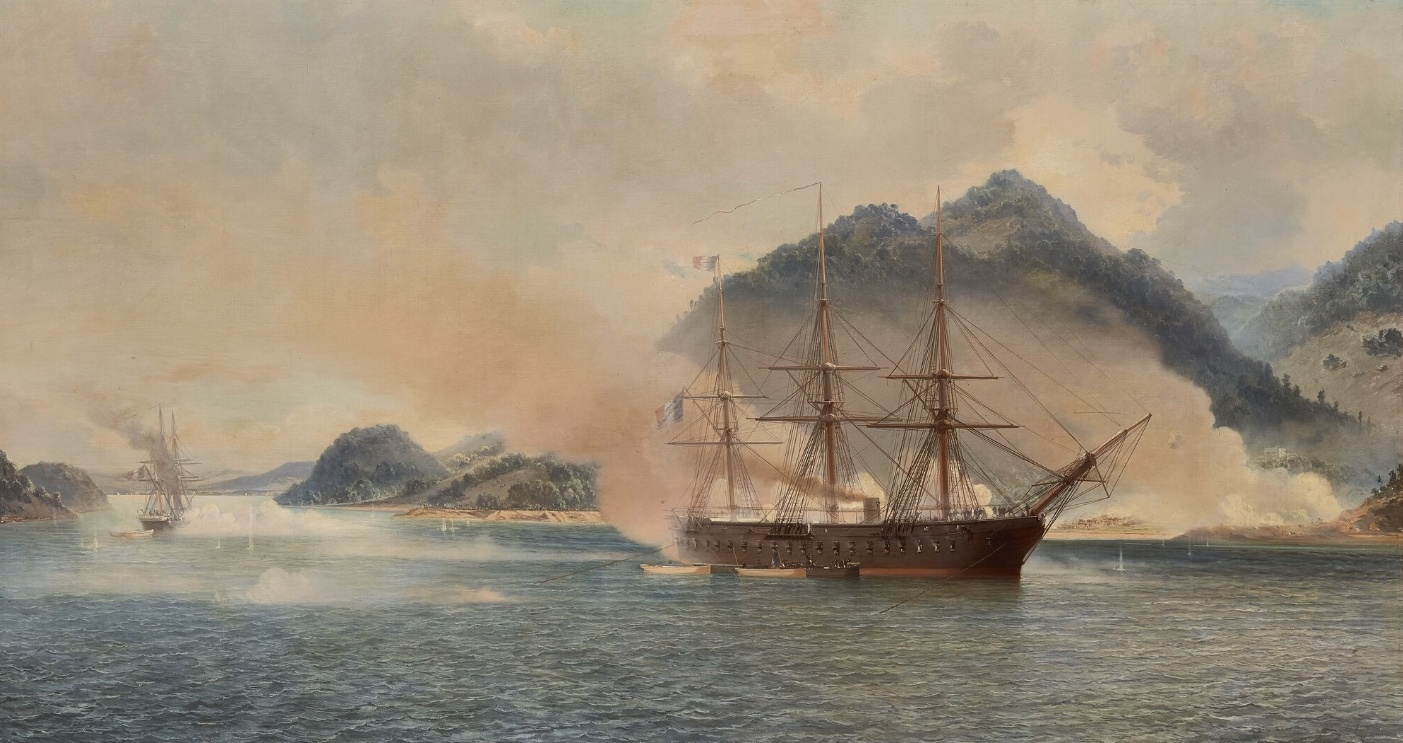
The bombardment of Shimonoseki by the French warship Tancrède (background) and the Admiral's flagship, Sémiramis. (foreground), Jean-Baptiste Henri Durand-Brager, 1865.

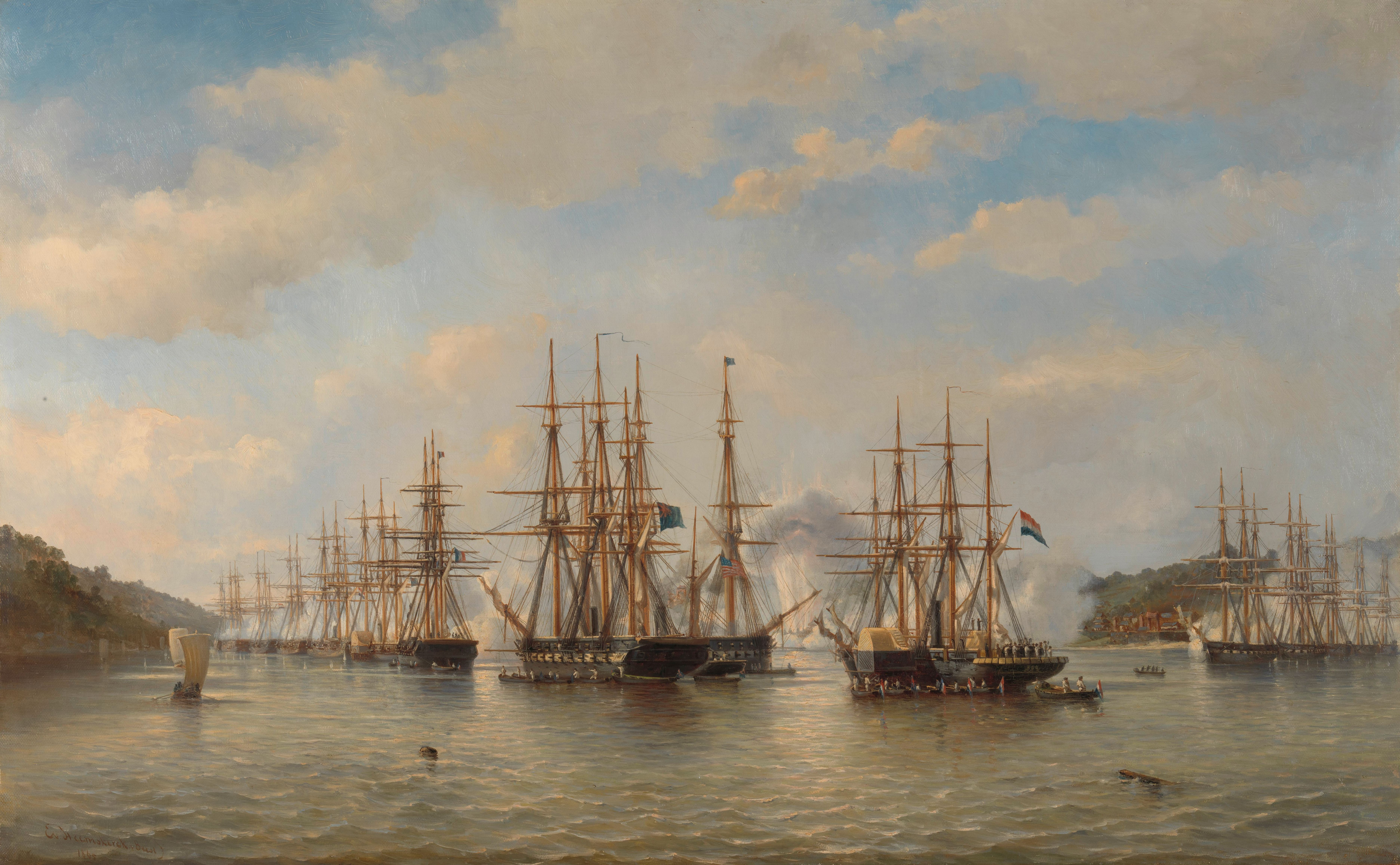
The bombardment of Shimonoseki, Jacob Eduard van Heemskerck van Beest

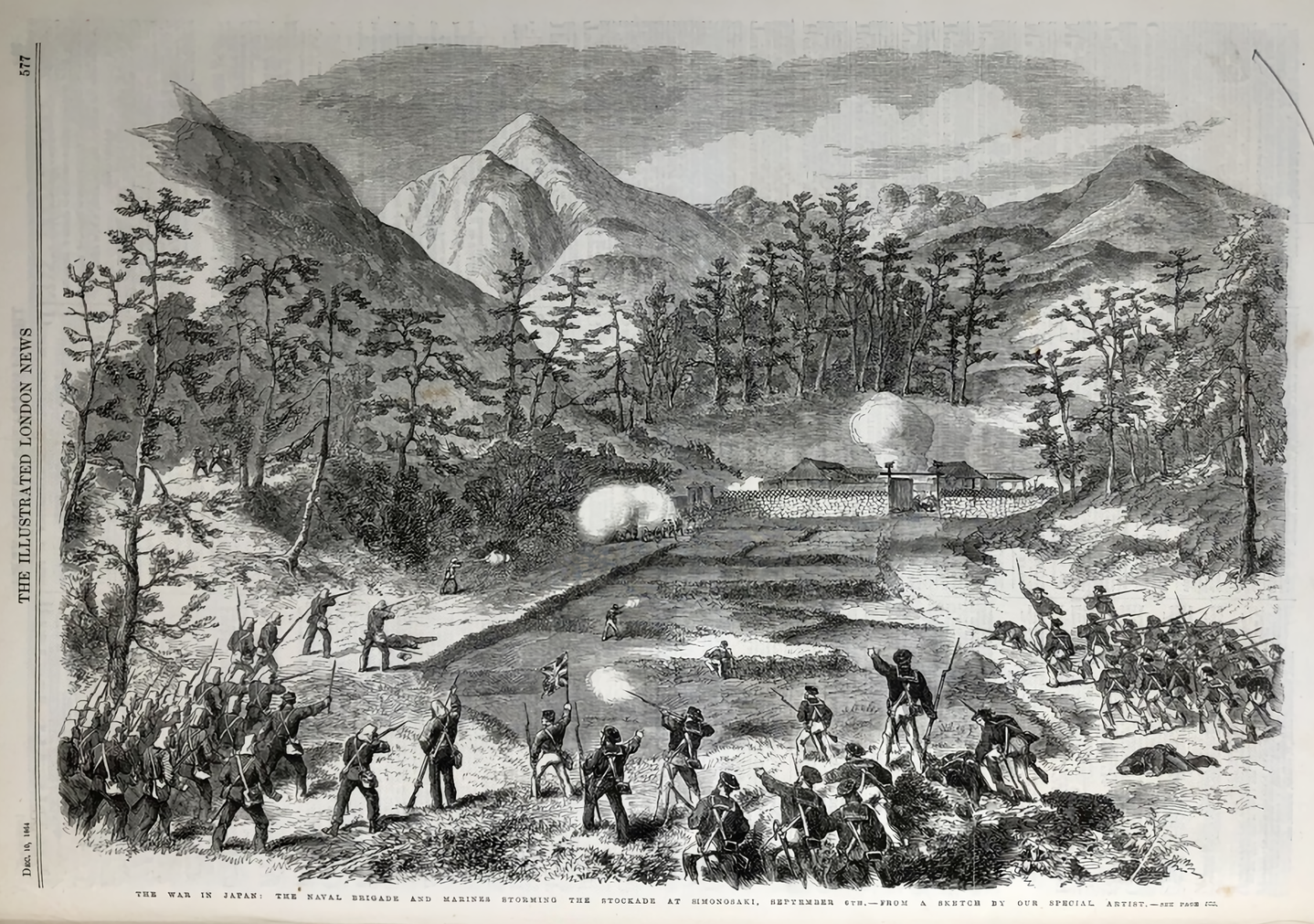
The British naval brigade and marines storm the stockade at Shimonoseki, The Illustrated London News, December 1864.

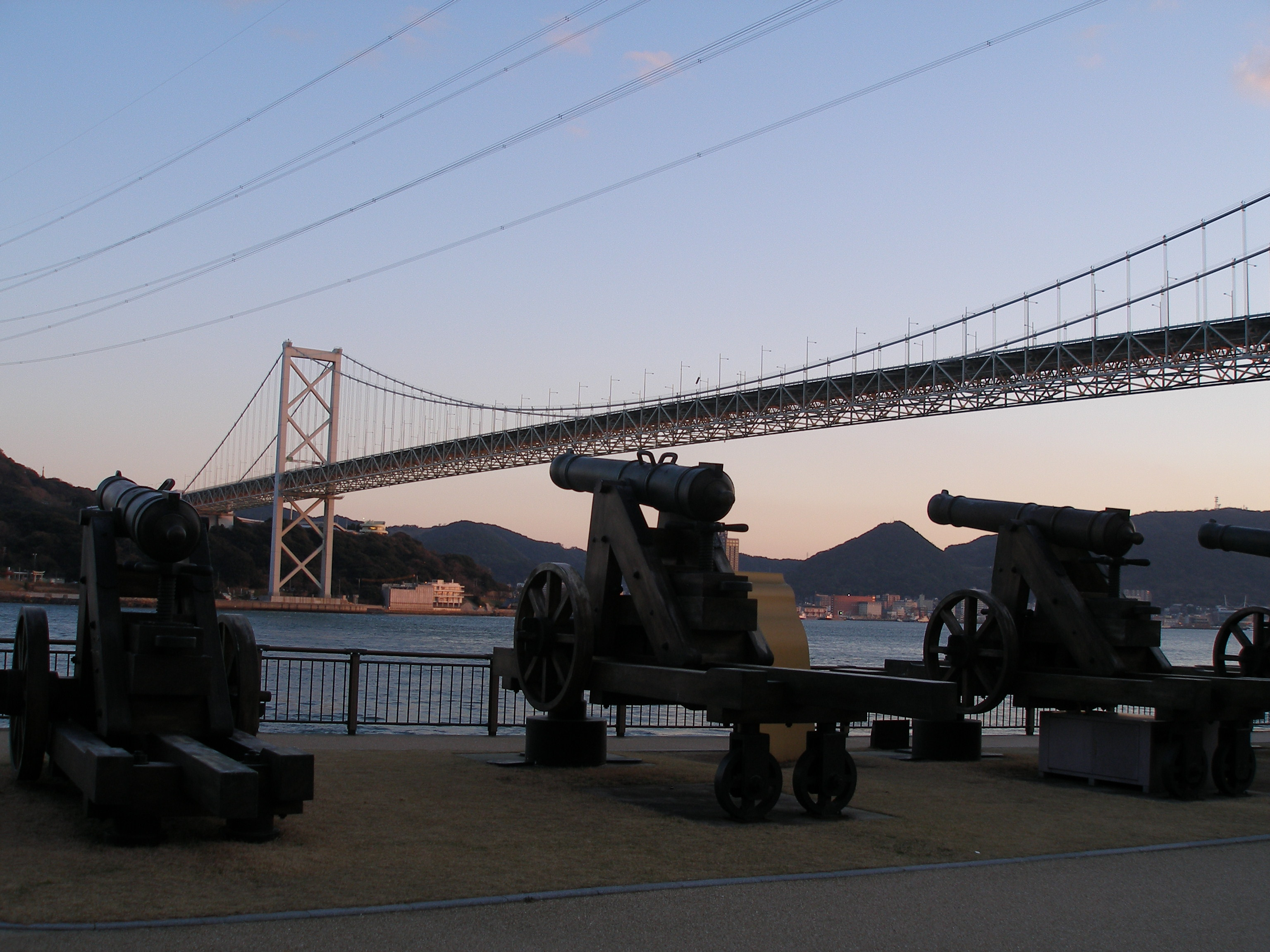
Replica cannons marking the battle.

On August 17, 1864, a squadron consisting of nine British (Euryalus, Conqueror, Tartar, Leopard, Barrosa, Perseus, Argus, Coquette, and Bouncer), four Dutch (Djambi, Metalen-Kruis, Medusa, and Amsterdam), and three French warships (Tancrède, Sémiramis, and Dupleix), together with 2,000 soldiers, marines and sailors, all under the command of Admiral Sir Augustus Kuper of the Royal Navy, steamed out of Yokohama to open Shimonoseki Strait.

The U.S. chartered steamer Ta-Kiang accompanied the operation in a token show of support. The two-day battle that followed on September 5 and 6 did what the previous operations could not; it destroyed the Chōshū Domain's ability to wage war on the Western powers. Unable to match the firepower of the international fleet, and amid mounting casualties, Takasugi Shinsaku negotiated peace with the four Western powers and Chōshū forces finally surrendered two days later on September 8, 1864.

Allied casualties included 72 killed or wounded; although Ernest Satow describes only 8 killed and 30 wounded for the British and two damaged British ships. A full account of the battle is contained in Ernest Satow's A Diplomat in Japan. Satow was present as a young interpreter for the British admiral, Augustus Kuper on the British flagship HMS Euryalus, commanded by Captain J. H. I. Alexander. It was also the action at which Duncan Gordon Boyes won his Victoria Cross (VC) at the age of seventeen. Satow described Boyes as receiving the award "for conduct very plucky in one so young." Another VC winner at Shimonoseki was Thomas Pride, and the third was the first American to win the medal, William Seeley. De Casembroot wrote his account of the events in De Medusa in de wateren van Japan, in 1863 en 1864.

The stringent accord, drawn up in the wake of the ceasefire and negotiated by U.S. Minister Pruyn, included an indemnity of $3,000,000 from the Japanese, an amount equivalent to the cost of about 30 steamships at that time. The Tokugawa shogunate proved unable to pay such an amount, and this failure became the basis of further foreign pressure to open Japanese ports; Japan was forced to choose between paying compensation of three million piastres and opening another port on the Inland Sea. The harbour of Hyōgo was opened to foreign trade, and customs tariffs were lowered uniformly to 5%. In 1883, twenty years after the first battle to reopen the strait, the United States returned $785,000.87 to Japan, which represented its share of the reparation payment.

== Aftermath ==
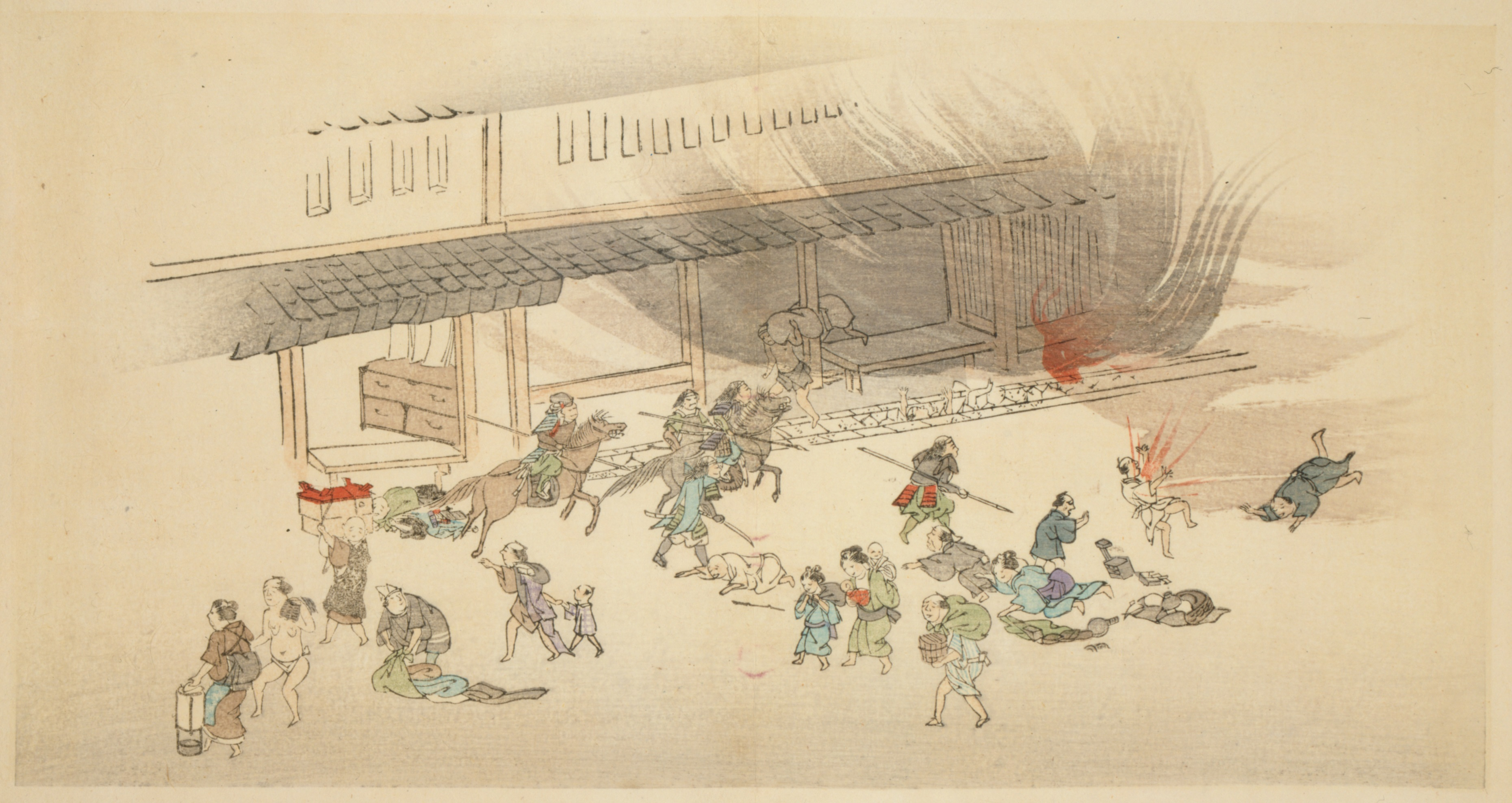
Chōshū forces attacked Shogunal forces in Kyōto on August 20, 1864, in the Kinmon incident

Right after the foreign interventions, the Shogunal government also launched its own preparations for a punitive expedition against Chōshū, the First Chōshū expedition. The expedition was aimed at punishing the 1864 Kinmon incident in which Chōshū forces attacked Shogunal forces in Kyoto. The expedition was however cancelled after a compromise was brokered, involving the beheading of the leaders of the rebellion.

== Historical significance ==
Closely resembling the series of little conflicts fought by the European powers in Asia, Africa and elsewhere during the nineteenth century, the troubles in Japan seemed to exemplify their gunboat diplomacy, a prevalent tool in imperialism. Bitter resentment against foreign influence made the Chōshū clan feel justified in engaging in acts of military provocation in defiance of their own government.

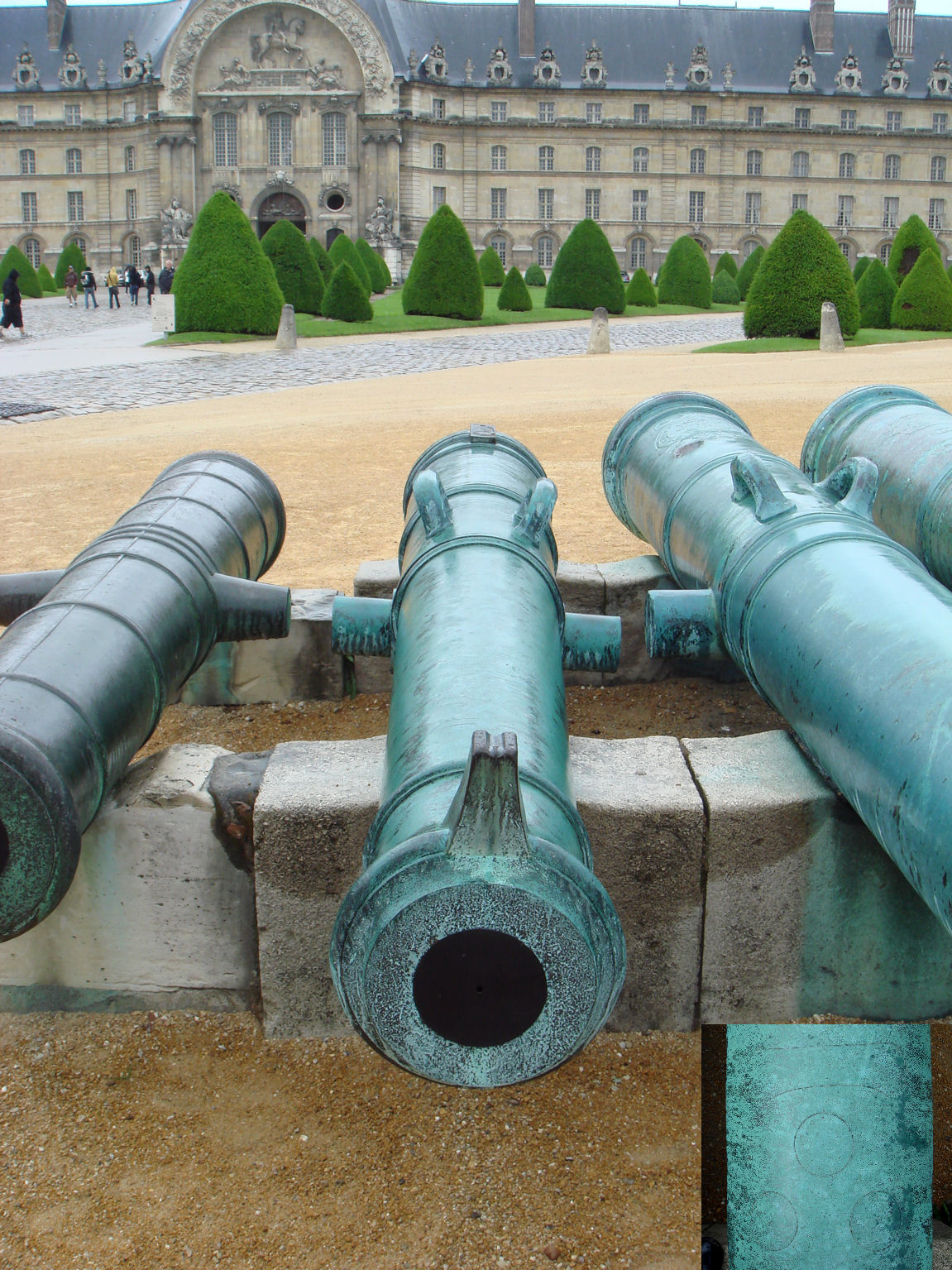
A cannon captured by the French at Shimonoseki. Today on display at the northern gate of Les Invalides, Paris. Lower right inset: the emblem (mon) of the Mōri clan inscribed on top of the cannon.

While it was bitterly embroiled in the American Civil War, President Abraham Lincoln's government was carefully watched by the world for signs of weakness and indecision. The actions of USS Wyoming made it the first foreign warship to offensively uphold treaty rights with Japan; this fact coupled with the possibility that the events would mire the U.S. in a foreign war made the battle of Shimonoseki a significant engagement.

While the battles of Shimonoseki Strait were mere footnotes in the histories of the European powers, an interesting aspect of the affair was the resourcefulness displayed by the Japanese. The feudal Japanese had not set eyes on a steam-powered ship until Commodore Perry's arrival only a decade before USS Wyoming's battle. Yet they had rapidly advanced in such a short period of time.

The Shimonoseki city government in 2004, in recognition of the importance of the bombardment in Japanese history, placed several life-size replicas of the guns used by Chōshū. The replicas are made of hollow steel and include coin-operated sound effects and smoke from the barrels.

== See also ==
- Treaty of Shimonoseki
