= French aviso Kien Chan =

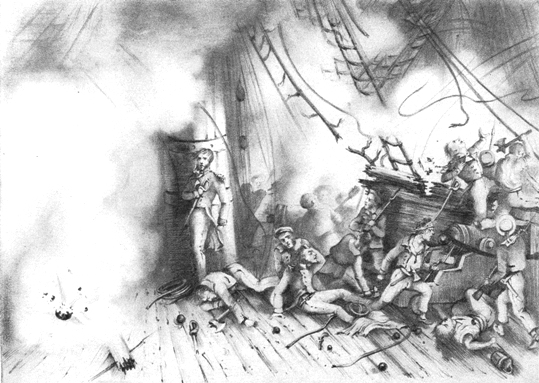
- Kien Chan under fire in the events that would lead to the Bombardment of Shimonoseki.

History

France
- Name: Kien Chan
- Namesake: Capture of the Kien Chan forts during the Siege of Tourane
- Builder: China
- Commissioned: 1860
- Stricken: 30 October 1873
- Fate: Broken up in Saigon between 1874 and 1876

General characteristics
- Propulsion: Sail; 320 shp (240 kW) steam engine
- Complement: 44
- Armament: 2 to 4 guns

Kien Chan was a Chinese-built ship, originally named Toey-Wan, purchased by the French Navy in 1860 and commissioned as an aviso.

== Career ==
Purchased in 1860, Kien Chan was used as a hospital ship during the Second Opium War. In 1861, her engine out of service, she explored the Hai River under Lieutenant Eugène Nielly. In 1863, she explored the Yangtze River up to Hankou, under Ensign Laurens. That same year, while sailing the Shimonoseki Straits, she came under fire from pro-imperial forces of the Chōshū Domain, an event that would lead to the Shimonoseki Campaign; Kien Chan sustained damage to her engine and lost four men.

In 1866, captained by Trève, Kien Chan took part in the French campaign against Korea.
