= Thomas Pride (VC) =

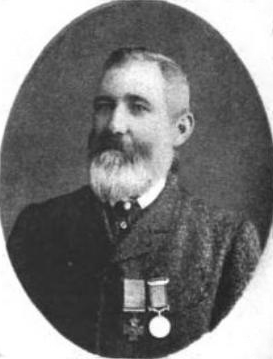
- Born: 29 March 1835; Wool, Dorset
- Died: 16 July 1893 (aged 58); Branksome, Dorset
- Burial place: All Saint's Churchyard, Branksome Park
- Military career
- Allegiance: United Kingdom
- Branch: Royal Navy
- Service years: 1854–1866
- Rank: Captain of the After Guard
- Units: HMS Euryalus
- Conflicts: Second Opium War; Battles for Shimonoseki
- Awards: Victoria Cross

Thomas Pride VC (29 March 1835 – 16 July 1893) was an English recipient of the Victoria Cross, the highest and most prestigious award for gallantry in the face of the enemy that can be awarded to a serviceman in the British and Commonwealth forces.

== Details ==
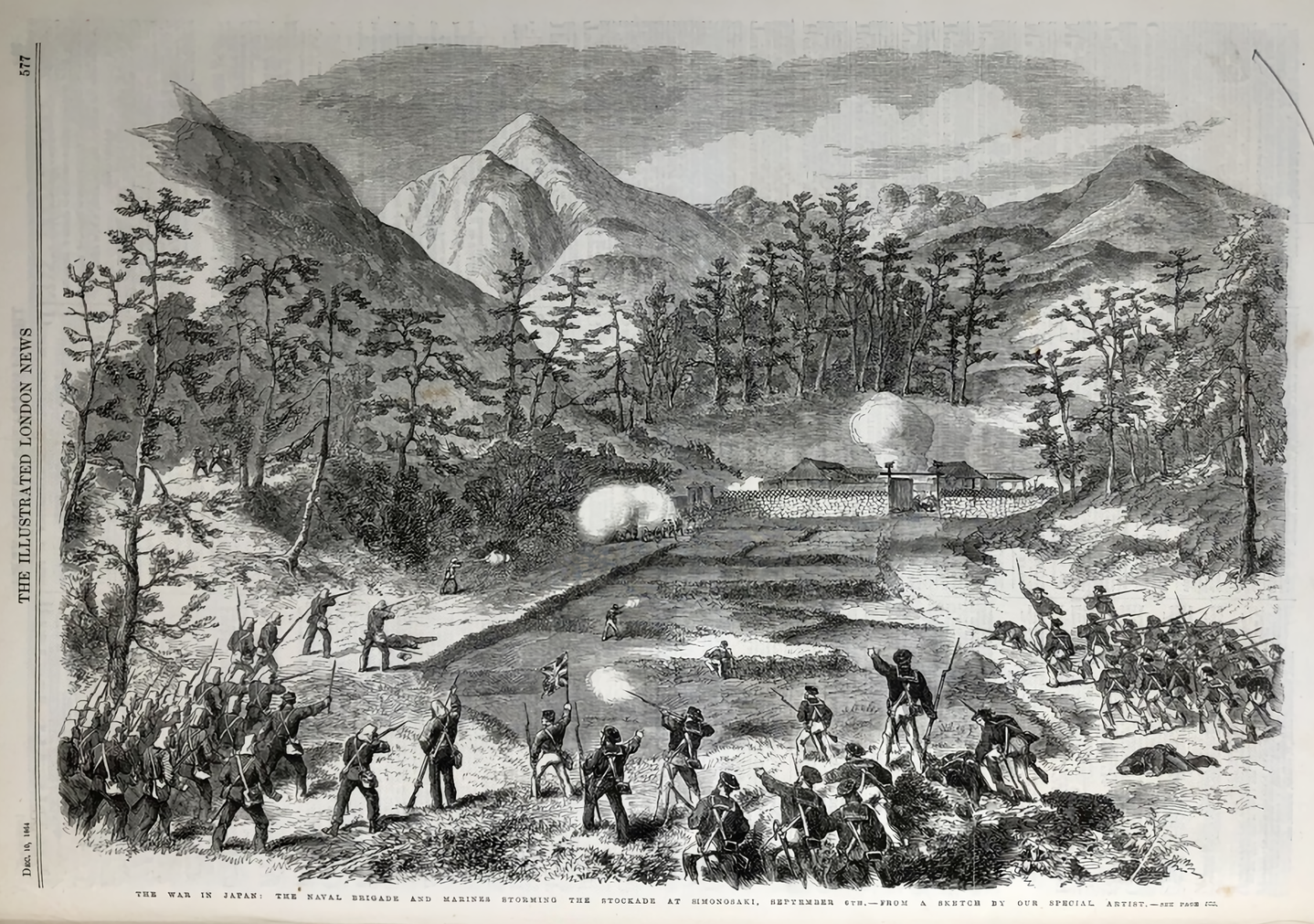
The British Naval Brigade and Royal Marines storm the stockade at Shimonoseki in September 1864. Illustrated London News, 24 December 1864

Pride was 29 years old, and a captain of the after guard in the Royal Navy during the Shimonoseki Expedition, Japan when the following deed took place for which he was awarded the VC.

On 6 September 1864 at Shimonoseki, Japan, Captain of the After Guard Pride was one of the two colour sergeants who accompanied Midshipman Duncan Gordon Boyes from HMS Euryalus when they carried the Queen's Colour into action in the capture of the enemy's stockade. They kept the flag flying in spite of the fierce fire which killed the other colour sergeant and severely wounded Pride. He and the midshipman, however, did not falter and were only finally prevented from going further forward by direct orders from their superior officer.

== Medal ==
His Victoria Cross is displayed at the National Maritime Museum at Greenwich, London.
