= French aviso Tancrède =

French Navy boat

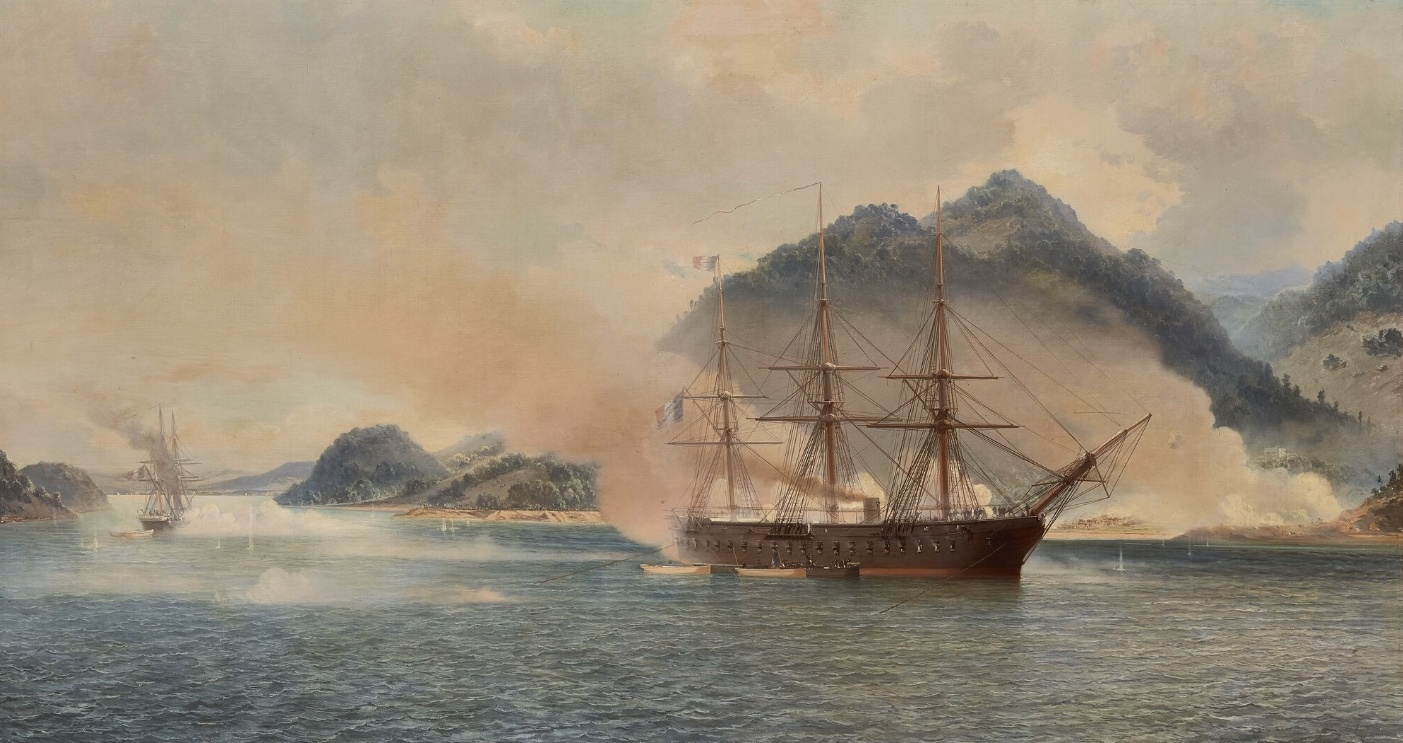
- Tancrède (background) and Dupleix (foreground) at the Bombardment of Shimonoseki.

History

France
- Name: Tancrède
- Builder: Chaigneau et Bichon, Lormont
- Laid down: 1 December 1859
- Launched: 29 May 1861
- Commissioned: 12 March 1862
- Decommissioned: 21 June 1866

General characteristics
- Class & type: Lynx class aviso
- Displacement: 750 tons
- Length: 56.6 metres
- Beam: 8.6 metres
- Draught: 2.8 metres
- Propulsion: Sail (1747 m²); 600 shp 2-cylinder steam engine, 1 propeller
- Complement: 74 men
- Armament: 2 guns

The Tancrède was a Lynx class aviso of the French Navy.

== Career ==
Designed by engineer Vésigné, Tancrède was appointed to the Far East division, where she took part in the Shimonoseki Campaign.
