= USS Ta-Kiang =

Gunboat of the United States Navy

History

United States
- Acquired: 18 August 1864
- In service: 28 August 1864
- Out of service: 22 September 1864
- Fate: Returned to charter agents, 1864

General characteristics
- Displacement: 510 tons
- Length: 154 ft 0 in (46.94 m)
- Beam: 28 ft 0 in (8.53 m)
- Draft: 11 ft (3.4 m)
- Depth of hold: 11 ft 6 in (3.51 m)
- Propulsion: steam engine; screw-propelled
- Complement: 40
- Armament: 30-pounder Parrott rifle

USS Ta-Kiang was a 510-ton steamer chartered by the Union Navy during the American Civil War.

Ta-Kiang was assigned by the Navy to be part of the Allied fleet proceeding to Japan to enforce the opening of the Shimonoseki straits in that country, in keeping with treaties already signed with Japan.

== Service history ==
Ta-Kiang (sometimes spelled Takiang and meaning "big river" in Chinese) was an oak-hulled, screw steamer built in 1862 at New York City by the shipbuilding firm of Rosevelt and Joyce, and was active in the China trade, probably under the British flag to avoid being molested by Confederate raiders and cruisers. In the summer of 1864, the British government chartered the ship to bring troops to Kanagawa, Japan, because of the anti-foreign sentiment then prevalent among certain segments of the Japanese population who were resisting westernization. As a result of an outgrowth of hostility to foreigners in the summer of 1863, a Prince of Nagato, Lord Mori of the Chōshū Domain fortified one side of the Strait of Shimonoseki to close that waterway to western commerce.

The following year, the western Treaty powers determined to open these waters once and for all. However, the only American warship then in that part of the world was the sail-powered sloop-of-war Jamestown, which could not overcome the strong currents in the strait and thus was unable to participate in any allied expedition to open navigation to foreign shipping. On 18 August 1864, so that the United States would be represented in the joint Anglo-French-Dutch force, Robert K. Pruyn, the minister resident of the United States in Japan, and Captain Cicero Price, the commanding officer of Jamestown, chartered Ta-Kiang from the firm Walsh, Hall, and Co., the agents for the steamer Ta-Kiang. Under the terms of the agreement, she was "to carry a landing party, and in every way to assist in the common object, but not to be under fire of the forts."

Before the joint expedition set sail, a mail steamer arrived bringing Japanese diplomats back from France with a treaty that had stipulated, among other provisions, that the Strait of Shimonoseki would be opened within three months. Ta-Kiang's charter was cancelled when word of the treaty first arrived, but the Japanese appeared unwilling to be bound by the agreement. This intransigence left the western powers no alternative to opening hostilities with Chōshū. Accordingly, the United States government rechartered Ta-Kiang and took her over on 28 August 1864. Capt. Price placed Lt. Frederick Pearson, of Jamestown, in command of the ship and also transferred 18 men—including a surgeon—and a 30-pounder Parrott rifle to the erstwhile merchantman. Price admonished Pearson to "render any and every other aid in your power to promote the common object, such as towing boats, landing men, and receiving the wounded ... if required to do so."

On the next day, 29 August, Ta-Kiang departed Yokohama in company with the Dutch steam sloop Djambe and arrived at the rendezvous point, Hime Shima, on the evening of 1 September. The following day, the remainder of the allied fleet arrived, "making a total of 18 sail." At 1000 on 4 September, the naval force got underway for Shimonoseki, in three columns, with Ta-Kiang bringing up the rear of the French column. The allied ships anchored in sight of the batteries on the shores of Nagato at 1600 that afternoon and, 24 hours later, moved in closer and commenced fire on the forts. By 1730 on the first day of the engagement, all of the batteries within sight had been silenced. During the night, British sailors and marines landed and spiked the guns of one battery. The Japanese commenced the action on 6 September, opening fire on the allied ships at 0600. During that action, Ta-Kiang towed a landing boat from the French steam corvette Dupleix, steaming close to the first battery. By noon, a mixed force of British, French, and Dutch troops had taken the batteries. The Westerners repulsed enemy counterattacks with ease; and, before nightfall, "the land forces returned to their vessels."

On 7 and 8 September, Ta-Kiang took on board 23 wounded Britons, as well as a surgeon and attendants, and ultimately returned to Yokohama on the evening of 21 September. During the attacks on the Shimonoseki forts, Ta-Kiang had fired 18 shells from her Parrott gun "thus identifying herself in this respect with the expedition." On 22 September 1864, Ta-Kiang was returned to her agents for a resumption of mercantile service. Records concerning the ultimate fate of this ship indicate that she was sold to the Japanese government in 1864, becoming Oye Maru (or Ooe Maru). Some evidence indicates that, in 1869, the ship was returned to the United States flag under Consular documents and was renamed Peiho.
