= French corvette Dupleix =

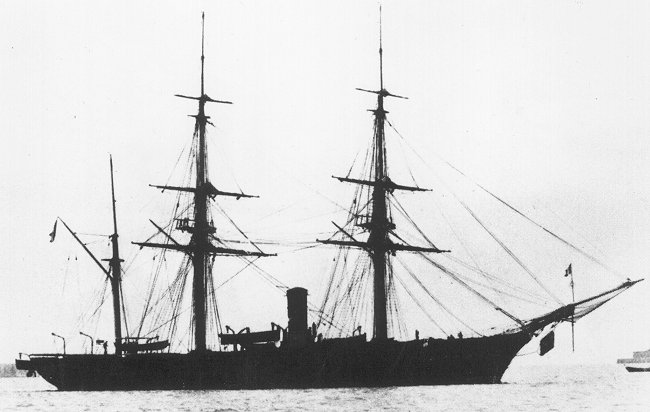
- Steam corvette Dupleix

History

France
- Name: Dupleix
- Namesake: Joseph François Dupleix
- Ordered: 1 October 1856
- Builder: Cherbourg Dockyard
- Laid down: 9 October 1856
- Launched: 28 March 1861
- Commissioned: 13 June 1861
- Decommissioned: 1887
- Stricken: 2 July 1887
- Fate: Scrapped

General characteristics
- Class & type: Cosmao-class corvette
- Displacement: 1,773 tonnes (1,745 long tons)
- Length: 66.34 metres (217 ft 8 in)
- Beam: 11.40 m (37 ft 5 in)
- Draught: 5.61 m (18 ft 5 in)
- Propulsion: Steam trunk engine, 986 ihp (735 kW)
- Speed: 11.66 knots (21.59 km/h; 13.42 mph)
- Complement: 191
- Armament: 10 × 160 mm (6.3 in) guns

Dupleix was a wooden-hulled screw corvette of the Cosmao class built for the French Navy. She was the first French vessel named after the 18th century governor of Pondichéry and governor general of the French possessions in India, Marquess Joseph François Dupleix. Laid down in 1856 at Cherbourg Dockyard and commissioned in 1861, Dupleix was assigned to France's Far East colonies. There, the vessel took part in the Boshin War and Franco-Prussian War. The ship returned to France and performed fishery patrols off Iceland until being taken out of service in 1887. The ship was scrapped in 1890.

== Background and description ==
In 1855 the Minister of Marine formed a commission to reorganize the French fleet. The commission created new classifications for ship types based on engine capability and as a result, ships formerly rated as corvettes lost that designation. This opened the need for new corvettes with increased armament and size. Dupleix and the Cosmao class were the result of the new requirements. Dupleix's overall design was by Louis-François Octave Vésignié, while the vessel's machinery was designed by Victorin Sabattier. Dupleix had a wooden hull that measured 66.34 metres (217 ft 8 in) long and 63.80 m (209 ft 4 in) at the waterline. The vessel had a maximum beam of 11.40 m (37 ft 5 in) and a max draught of 5.61 m (18 ft 5 in). The vessel had a displacement of 1,773 tonnes (1,745 long tons) and was crewed by 191 sailors.

The corvette was propelled by a single screw turned by a 400 nominal horsepower two-cylinder trunk engine powered by steam from oval boilers. During trials, Dupleix achieved 986 indicated horsepower (735 kW). The ship carried 340 t (330 long tons; 370 short tons) of coal for fuel and had a maximum speed of 11.66 knots (21.59 km/h; 13.42 mph). The vessels were also equipped with sails for propulsion. As built, Dupleix mounted ten 16 cm (6.3 in) M1860 rifles. These were later removed and replaced by twelve 14 cm (5.5 in) M1870 rifles. (Note: Campbell has wholly different dimensions. They state that vessel measured 67.26 m (220 ft 8 in) long at the waterline, with a beam of 11.38 m (37 ft 4 in) and a draught of 5.69 m (18 ft 8 in). The vessel displaced 1,824 t (1,795 long tons) and had a crew of 203. The engines created 1,215 ihp (906 kW).)

== Construction and career ==
The French Navy placed an order for the ship based on Vésignié's design on 1 October 1856. The ship was built at the Cherboug Dockyard under the supervision of Vésignié, Nathaniel Villaret and Adrien Joyeux. The keel was laid down on 9 October 1856 and the vessel was launched on 28 March 1861. The machinery was ordered from Indret in March 1858 and installation was completed in December 1861. Dupleix, named for the 18th century governor of Pondichéry and governor general of the French possessions in India, Marquess Joseph François Dupleix, was commissioned on 13 June 1861.

After her commissioning, Dupleix was sent to the Chinese Sea under Vice-Admiral Jaures. She arrived in Saigon on 25 August 1862, and made short stops in Ryukyu Islands and the port of Hakodate on the island of Hokkaidō, before arriving in Yokohama.

=== Bombardment of Shimonoseki ===
During the bombardment of Shimonoseki (5 September 1864), Dupleix was second in the line of corvettes, between the British Tartar and the Dutch Metallkruz. She fired 411 shots and received 22 cannonballs (seven in the hull, four under the waterline, and 11 in the sails). She had two killed and eight wounded. On 28 December 1864, Dupleix sailed back to France, where she was decommissioned on 25 June 1865. She was re-commissioned in Cherbourg in 1867, and sent back to serve in the "Far-East Naval Division", under Counter-Admiral Gustave Ohier. She arrived in Yokohama in February 1868, and was immediately involved in the events of the Japanese Revolution.

=== Sakai incident ===
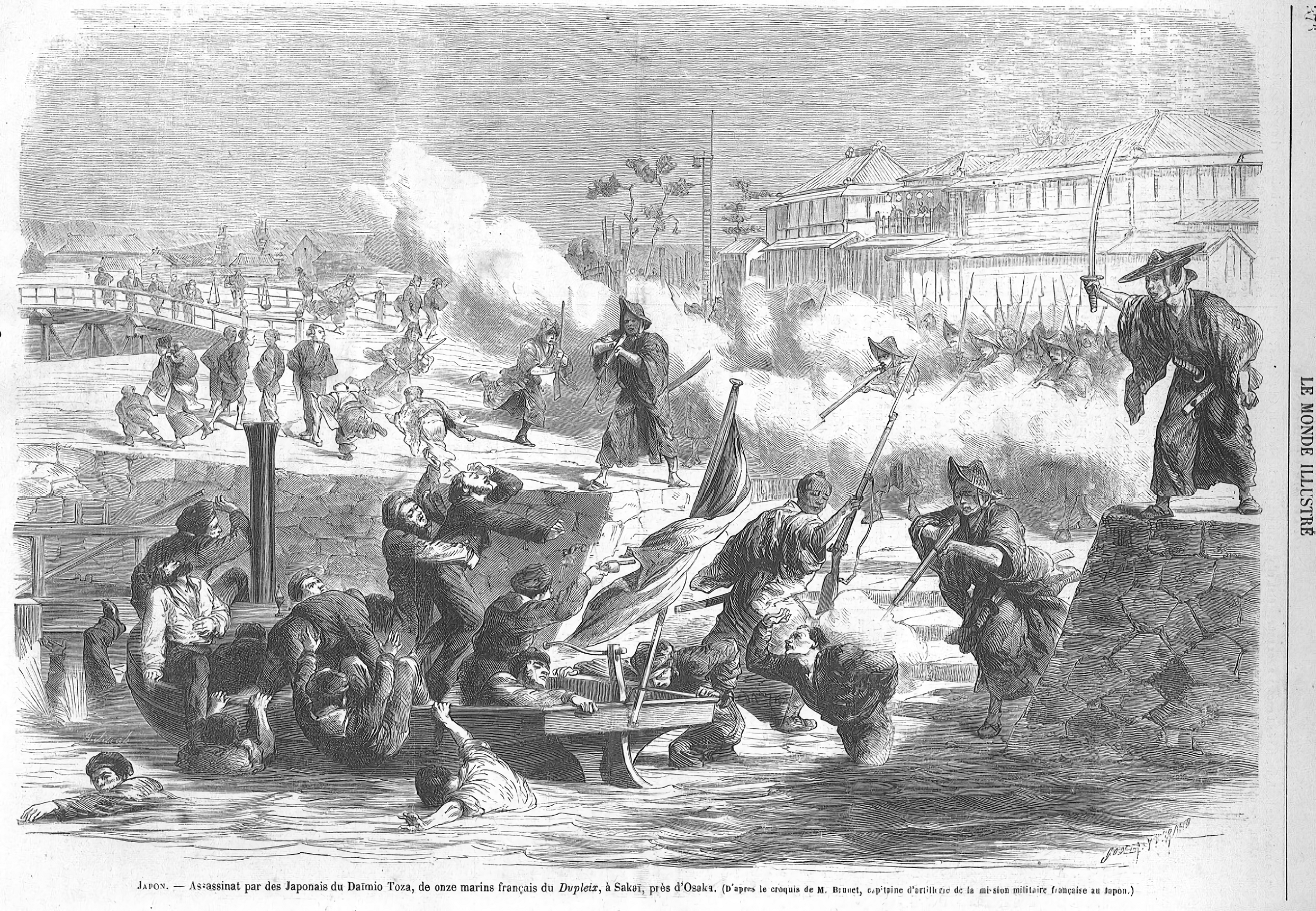
Sakai incident, Japan (堺事件), Le Monde Illustré, 1868.

On 8 March 1868, a skiff sent to Sakai was attacked by samurai retainers of the daimyō of Tosa; twelve sailors were killed. The captain, Abel-Nicolas Bergasse du Petit-Thouars, protested so strongly that the culprits were arrested, and 20 of them were sentenced to death by seppuku. However, the execution style was so shocking to the French that after 11 were carried out, the French captain requested grace for the survivors. This allowed the French and Japanese parties to reconcile, and is now known as the "Sakai incident", or Sakai Jiken (堺事件).

On 16 April 1868, Dupleix was the first Western ship to salute the Japanese emperor at Fort Tempozan. In October of the same year, Dupleix was sent to Hokkaidō. She rescued the British corvette HMS Rattler, which was shipwrecked at Romanzoff Bay, in La Pérouse Strait.

=== Hokkaidō and final years ===
Relieved by the aviso Coëtlogon, Dupleix was stationed in the northern port of Hakodate during the Battle of Hakodate, in order to guarantee French interests there. She brought back Captain Jules Brunet and his companions from Hakodate to Yokohama after the fall of the Republic of Ezo.

From July 1870 to February 1871, Dupleix blockaded the German frigate Hertha in Nagasaki as part of operations during the Franco-Prussian War. In March, Dupleix sailed back to Cherbourg to be decommissioned. From 1876 to 1886, Dupleix was re-armed every year from March to October to monitor fishery operations in Iceland. She was struck from the French naval list on 2 July 1887 at Cherbourg. The vessel was broken up in 1890.
