= Edward St. John Neale =

British Lieutenant-Colonel and Diplomat

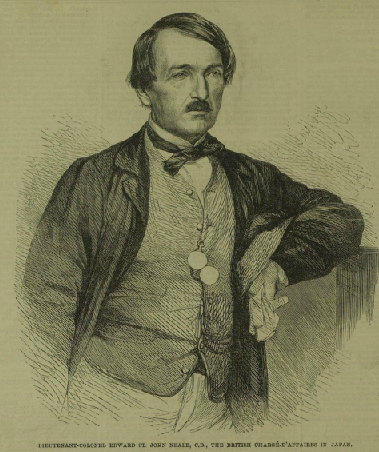
Edward St John Neale, British Chargé d'Affaires in Japan in 1864

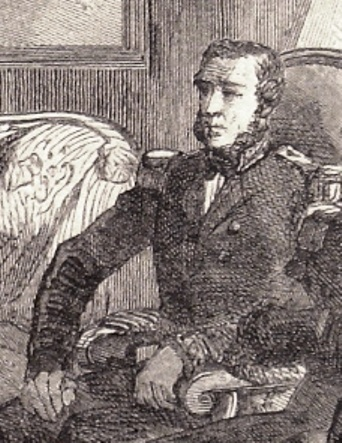
Lieutenant-Colonel Neale in 1863

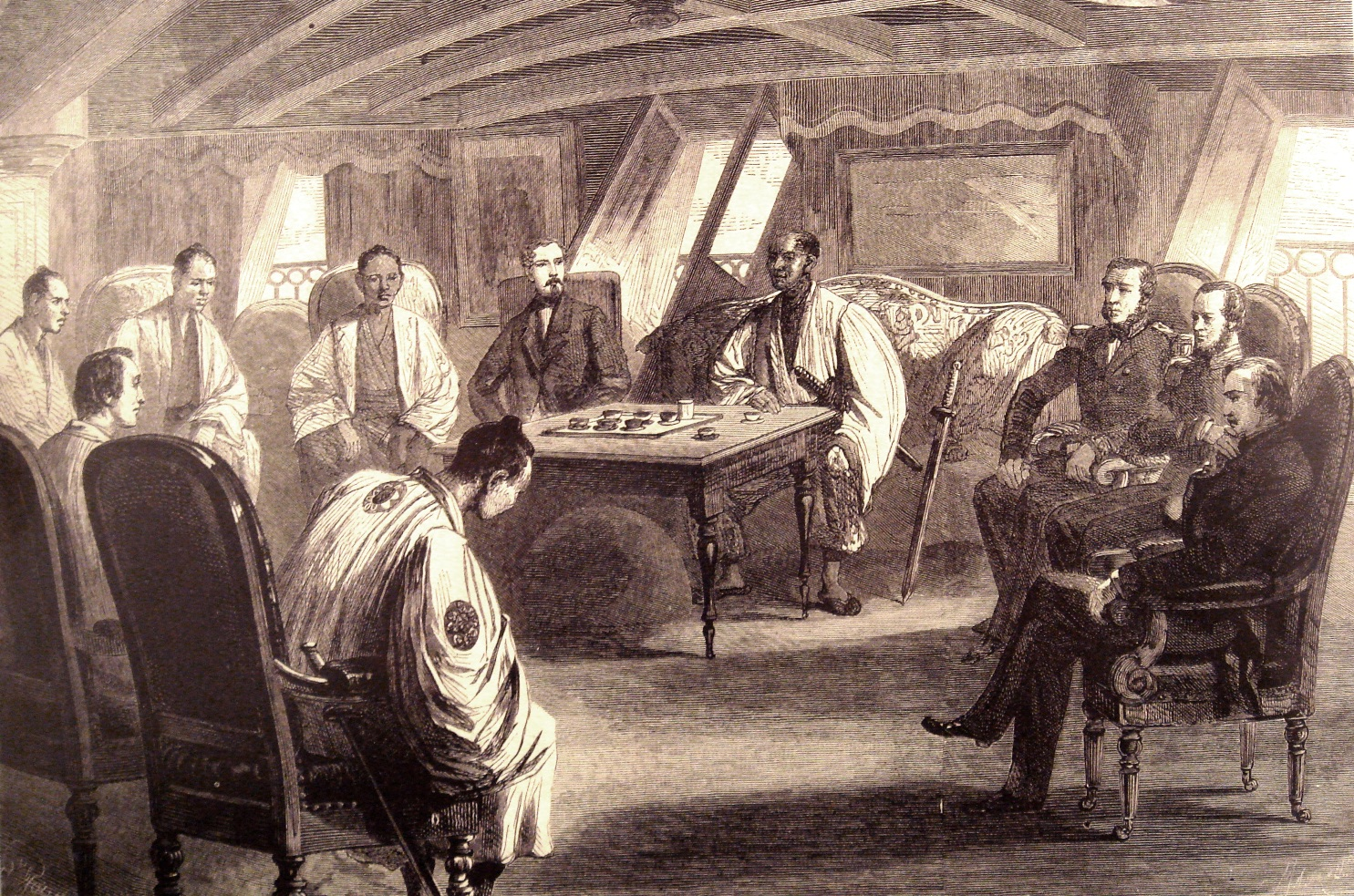
Franco-Anglo-Japanese conference on the French ship Sémiramis, 2 July 1863, following the Namamugi incident Forefront: French interpreter Blekman, Japanese interpreter. Background (from left to right): Three Japanese governors of Yokohama, Duchesne de Bellecourt, Daimyō Sakai-Hida-no-Kami, Colonel Neale (British representative in Japan), Admiral Jaurès, Admiral Kuper

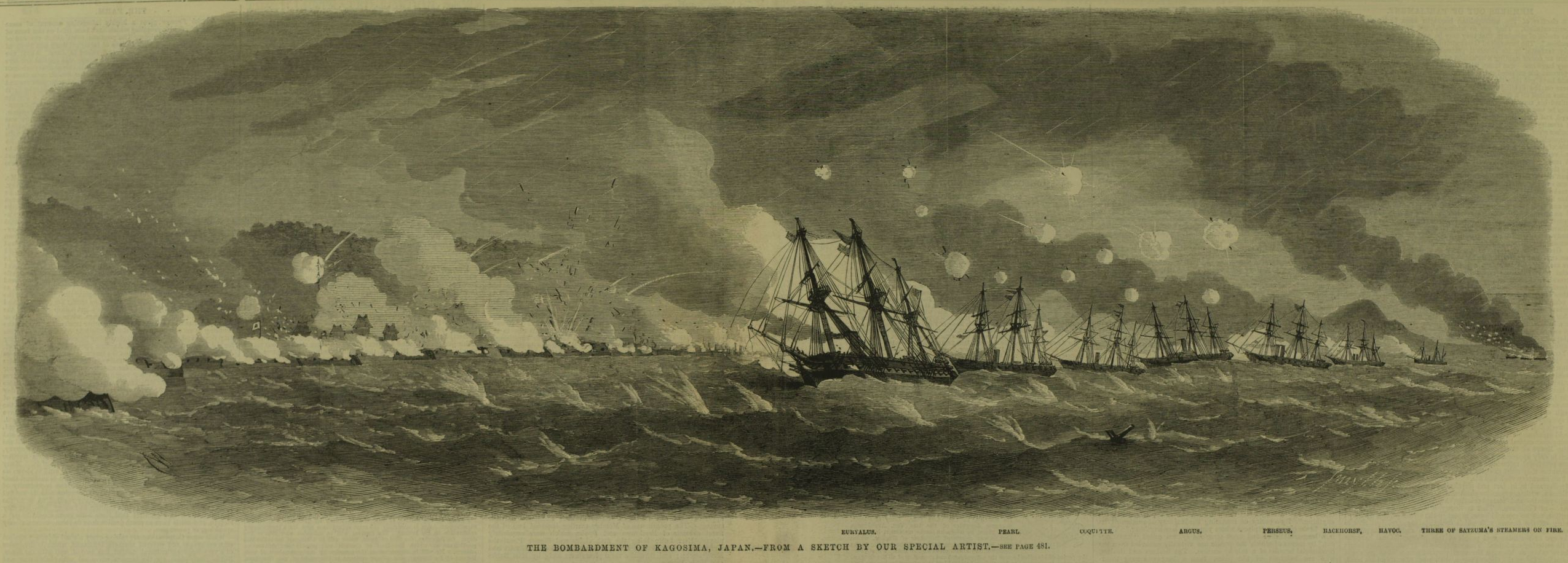
Colonel Neale led the Bombardment of Kagoshima, on board the flagship Euralyus in August 1863.

Edward St. John Neale (1812–1866) was a British Lieutenant-Colonel and Diplomat who was active in Asia in the 1860s. He was the Chargé d'affaires of Great Britain in Japan in 1862–1863. Neale, who had been stationed in Beijing from 1860 as Secretary of the Legation following the settlement of the Second Opium War, was transferred to Japan in March 1862, when Rutherford Alcock went home on leave. Alcock returned to Japan in 1864 (to be replaced by Sir Harry Parkes as British Minister in Japan in 1865).

== Actions in Japan ==
Following the murder of Charles Lennox Richardson in September 1862, Neale exercised great caution in his response to the Japanese authorities, earning the furious opprobrium of the Western community in Yokohama, who called for immediate retribution. He was eventually vindicated by the British Government and appointed CB in 1863 for his coolness. In March 1863, the Emperor of Japan issued the Order to expel barbarians, which led Neale to issue an ultimatum to the Japanese government, which was on the brink of starting a war with foreign powers in order to return to the isolation policy. Neale was extremely vocal when the Bakufu, under pressure from the Emperor, was finally forced to issue a declaration promulgating the end of relations with foreigners. The order was forwarded to foreign legations by Ogasawara Zusho no Kami on 24 June 1863. Lieutenant-Colonel Neale, responded in very strong terms, equating the move with a declaration of war:

"It is, in fact, a declaration of war by Japan itself against the whole of the Treaty Powers, and the consequences of which, if not at once arrested, it will have to expiate by the severest and most merited chastisement"

— Edward Neale, 24 June 1863.

A few days later, on 2 July 1863, Colonel Neale led the negotiations for the reparations following the 1862 Namamugi incident, in which foreigners were attacked and one killed by a party from Satsuma, The failure of Satsuma to apologize and pay for reparations led to the Bombardment of Kagoshima by the Royal Navy in August 1863, in which Neale participated on board the flagship Euralyus.

== Modern appraisal ==
Neale received a mixed but ultimately complimentary review in the 2004 book by Cortazzi on the relations between Japan and Great Britain:

"My impression is that he was a conscientious man who gave almost all his attention to his work. His courage, moral and physical, ... cannot be doubted. He was something of a martinet (understandable in view of his military background), had a short fuse, was often impatient and used language which was sometimes intemperate. His self-justificatory references in his despatches to his alone having prevented a war suggest that he felt rather lonely and isolated. This was not unjustified. He was probably not outstandingly intelligent, but he had common sense and his actions were usually restrained and cautious. He had no previous knowledge of Japan and did not know the language, thus often probably failing to realise all the complexities of translating from Japanese, with its tendency to use vague expressions, via Dutch into English. His subordinates had not yet had the time either to master the language or the political situation. His reports are not examples of the best diplomatic style, but at least they are more to the point, clearer and brief than the effusions of Rutherford Alcock. In the circumstances his judgments were relatively sound."

— Hugh Cortazzi
