= William Willis (physician) =

British physician

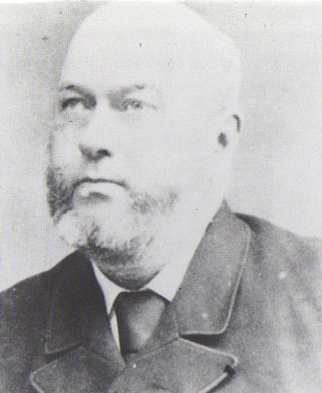
- Born: 1 May 1837; Fermanagh, Ireland
- Died: 14 February 1894 (aged 56); Moneen, Fermanagh, Ireland
- Resting place: Florencecourt, Ireland
- Occupations: Doctor, foreign advisor to Japan
- Known for: Foreign advisor to Meiji Japan

William Willis FRCS (1 May 1837 – 14 February 1894) was an Irish medical doctor who joined the British mission in Japan in 1861.

== Biography ==
Willis was born in Maguiresbridge, County Fermanagh, Ireland in 1837. In 1855 he was enrolled at the faculty of medicine in the University of Glasgow (Scotland), where he completed his pre-medical and pre-clinical studies. He then transferred to the University of Edinburgh. After his graduation in May 1859 with the thesis "Theory of ulceration" he became a member of the Royal College of Surgeons of Edinburgh and received the degree of Doctor of Medicine of the University with a thesis on the "Theory of Ulceration". He then worked at the Middlesex Hospital located in London. In 1861 he was accepted for a medical post with the British legation in Japan. He reached Edo in May 1862 to begin his duties as medical officer and clerk under Sir Harry Smith Parkes. Between 1862 and 1867 he worked mainly in Yokohama. Being there on the day of Charles Lennox Richardson's death at the hands of retainers of daimyō Shimazu Hisamitsu (otherwise Shimazu Saburō), Willis performed the autopsy.

Among his students was Takaki Kanehiro, the first scientist-physician to prove that beriberi was connected to malnutrition, and the founder of Japan's first private medical college. During the unsettled years at the end of the Tokugawa bakufu and the early Meiji Restoration, Willis treated the British nationals wounded in the Namamugi Incident and the Bombardment of Kagoshima.

Willis later participated to the Boshin War as the head of medical operations for the Satsuma Domain. During the Battle of Toba–Fushimi, he set up a military hospital in the temple of Shōkokuji (相国寺) in Kyoto, not far from the front line. He continued to support the medical operations of the Satsuma side throughout the Boshin War.

Willis was later appointed professor and clinical chief of the Igakko (later the faculty of medicine of Tokyo Imperial University).

In 1870, Willis resigned to become head of the hospital and medical school in Kagoshima at the invitation of Saigō Takamori. The institution later became the medical department of Kagoshima University. Willis married a Japanese woman in Kagoshima, Enatsu Yae (1850-1931), the daughter of a former retainer of Shimazu Nariakira, with whom he had a son, Albert (1873-1943). With the outbreak of the Satsuma Rebellion in 1877, Willis returned to Tokyo.

Willis returned to England in 1881, and became a Fellow of the Royal Surgical Medical Association (F.R.C.S.).

In 1885, Willis was appointed, on the recommendation of his good friend Ernest Satow, as a doctor with the British Consulate General in Bangkok. In addition to public hospitals, he established a large-scale private hospital in Bangkok, and treated King Rama V and the king's brother, returning to England in 1892.

According to Satow, Willis was unusually tall at 190.5 cm, and weighed 127 kg.

== See also ==
- Japan–United Kingdom relations
