= Ishibashi =

Ishibashi (石橋, literally "stone bridge") may refer to:

- Ishibashi (surname)
- Ishibashi, Tochigi, a town located in Shimotsuga District, Tochigi Prefecture, Japan
- Ishibashi handai-mae Station, formerly Ishibashi Station, a train station located in Ikeda, Osaka Prefecture, Japan
- Ishibashi Park is a park in Hama-machi, Kagoshima, Japan
- Ishibashi Station (Tochigi), a train station located in Ishibashi, Tochigi, Japan
- Minakuchi Ishibashi Station, a passenger railway station in located in the Japanese city of Kōka
