= Augustus Kuper =

Royal Navy Admiral (1809–1885)

Admiral Sir Augustus Kuper GCB
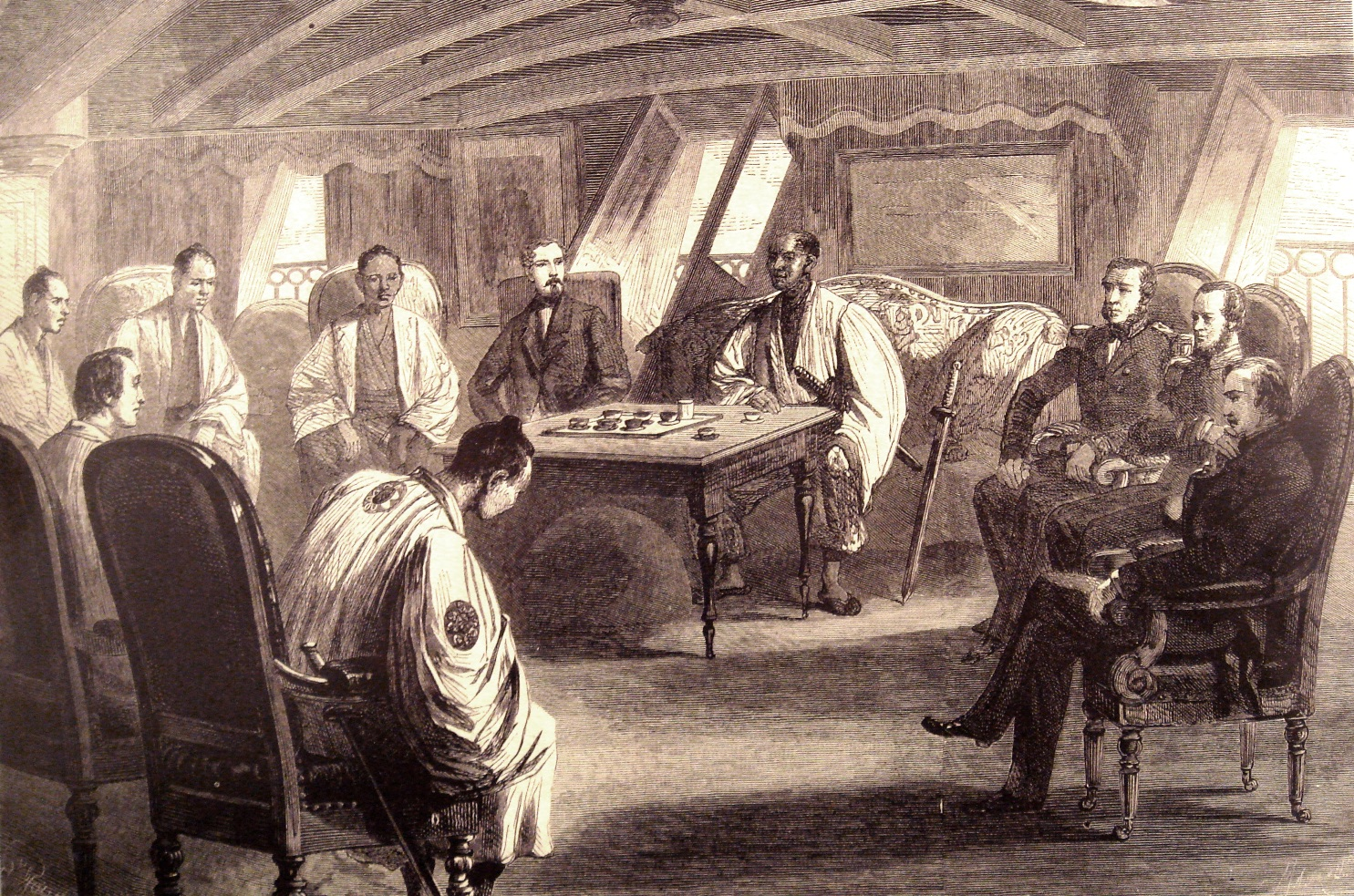
- Franco-Anglo-Japanese conference on the Semiramis, 2 July 1863. Forefront: French interpreter Frederik Blekman, Japanese interpreter. Background (from left to right): Three Japanese governors of Yokohama, Duchesne de Bellecourt, daimyō Sakai-Hida-no-Kami, Colonel Neale (British representative in Japan), Admiral Jaurès, Admiral Kuper
- Born: 16 August 1809
- Died: 28 October 1885 (aged 76)
- Military career
- Allegiance: United Kingdom
- Branch: Royal Navy
- Service years: 1823–1876
- Rank: Admiral
- Commands: Pelorous; Alligator; Calliope; Thetis; HMS London; East Indies and China Station
- Conflicts: First Opium War; Bombardment of Kagoshima; Shimonoseki campaign
- Awards: Knight Grand Cross of the Order of the Bath

Admiral Sir Augustus Leopold Kuper GCB (16 August 1809 – 28 October 1885) was a Royal Navy officer known for his commands in East Asia.

== Naval career ==
Born in 1809 in England, Kuper was a son of Wilhelm Kuper, D.D., a German-born Lutheran pastor who from 1802 until 1861 was the chaplain of the Royal German Chapel at St James's Palace, Westminster, and was also chaplain to Queen Adelaide. The young Kuper joined the navy in 1823 as a midshipman. On 20 February 1830 he became a lieutenant. On 17 October 1831 he was appointed a lieutenant in Savage, commanded by Lord Edward Russell, on the Irish station. On 9 April 1832, he followed Russell to Nimrod, off the coast of Spain. On 27 August 1833, John Macdougall succeeded Russell, still on the Spain–Portugal station. From 30 March 1836, he was a lieutenant in Minden, commanded by Alexander Renton Sharpe, at Lisbon. Then on 10 July 1837 he moved to Alligator, commanded by Gordon Bremer, at Australia, who was involved in founding the settlement at Port Essington.

From 27 July 1839, he was a lieutenant and acting captain of Pelorous. While he was captain Pelorus wrecked on 25 November by a cyclone at Port Essington. There were no casualties and eventually she was refloated. In December 1840 he was promoted to commander, retroactive to when he took command of Pelorus.

On 5 March 1840 he became Acting Captain in Alligator, and with her he participated in the First Opium War (1840–1842). On 8 June 1841 he received a promotion to captain, and on 14 June he took command of Calliope and participated in the operations that led to the capitulation of Canton, China (now Guangzhou). On 21 January 1842 he was made a Companion of the Bath (CB).

From 3 July 1850 to February 1854 he was captain in Thetis from her commissioning at Plymouth. He sailed her to the south-east coast of America and then the Pacific. Kuper Island in the Strait of Georgia, off the east coast of Vancouver Island, was named for him after he surveyed the area from 1851 to 1853.

From 13 August 1855 to 24 January 1856 he was the captain of HMS London in the Mediterranean.

In 1861 he was promoted to rear-admiral and in 1862 he succeeded Admiral Sir James Hope as Commander-in-Chief, East Indies and China Station. His tenure coincided with the later stages of British involvement in the Taiping Rebellion.

In August 1863 he hoisted his flag in the wooden screw-frigate Euryalus and led a British squadron of seven warships to Kagoshima to coerce the daimyō of Satsuma into paying the £25,000 demanded by the British Government as reparation to the British victims of the Namamugi Incident. During the Bombardment of Kagoshima the captain of Euryalus, John James Steven Josling, was killed, as was his second-in-command, Commander Wilmot, both decapitated by the same cannonball.

In 1864 Kuper was in command of the International fleet at the Shimonoseki Expedition, Japan, the action fought to reopen the Inland Sea and the Straits of Shimonoseki. His interpreter at Shimonoseki was Ernest Satow. Kuper was made a Knight Commander of the Order of the Bath (KCB) on 25 February 1864 'in acknowledgement of his services at Kagoshima'. In due course, i.e., on 2 June 1869, he became a Knight Grand Cross of the Bath (GCB). He was promoted to the rank of vice-admiral in 1866 and to admiral in 1872.

== Family ==
On 19 June 1837 he married Emma Margaret, eldest daughter of Rear Admiral Sir Gordon Bremer. Kuper had served under Bremer during the Opium Wars.

Military offices
Preceded by Sir James Hope	Commander-in-Chief, East Indies and China Station; 1862–1864	Succeeded by Sir George King
