= Opium in China =

Opium in China may refer to:

- History of opium in China
- Opium Wars, the mid-1800s conflicts between Western powers and China including:
  - the First Opium War (1839–1842)
  - the Second Opium War (1856–1860)
- 1967 Opium War, conflict between marooned elements of the Kuomintang (Chinese Nationalist Party) and the Kingdom of Laos
- Illegal drug trade in China#Opium

== See also ==
- Opium War (disambiguation)
