= Order to expel barbarians =

1863 Japanese imperial edict

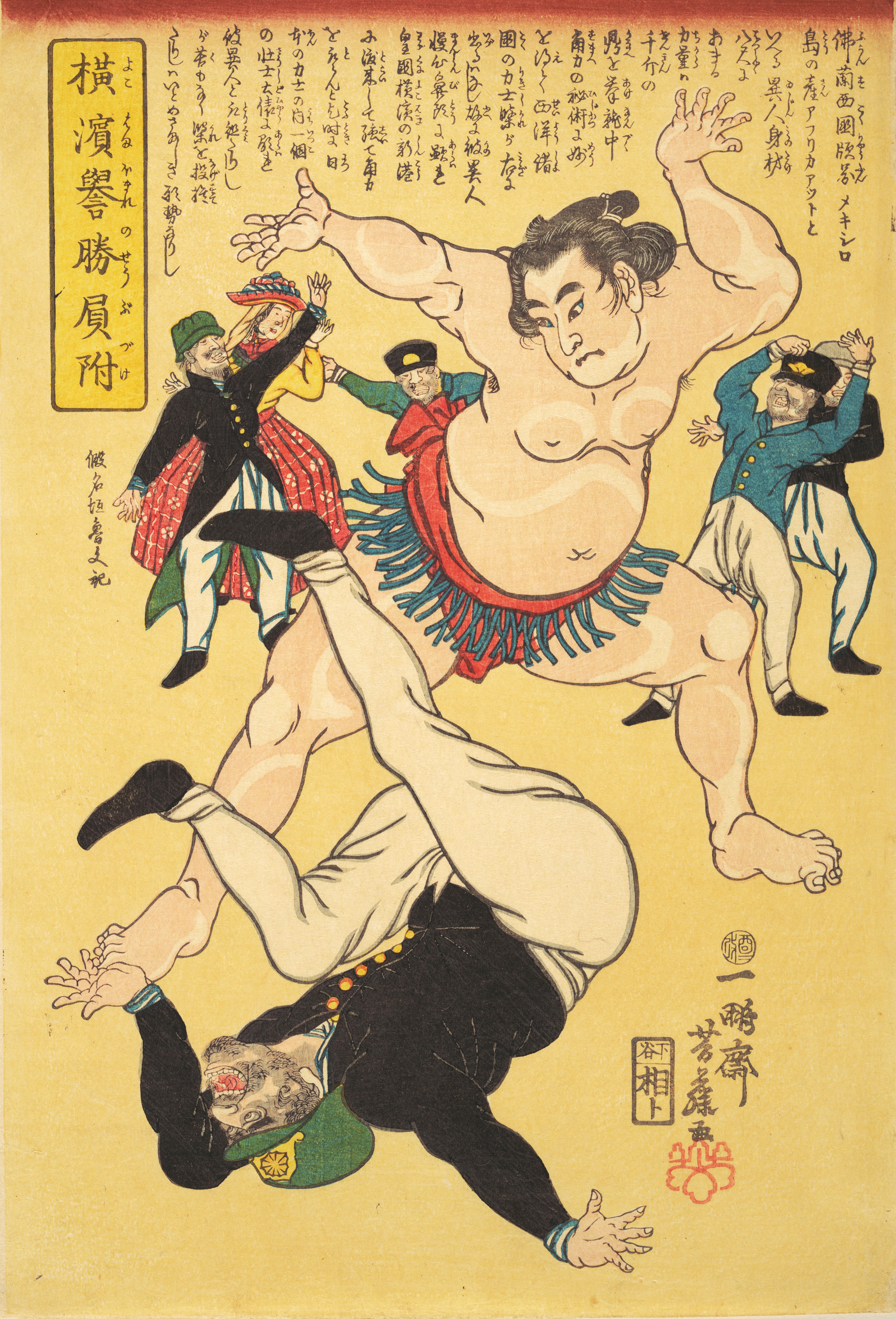
An 1861 image expressing the Joi (攘夷, "Expel the Barbarians") sentiment.

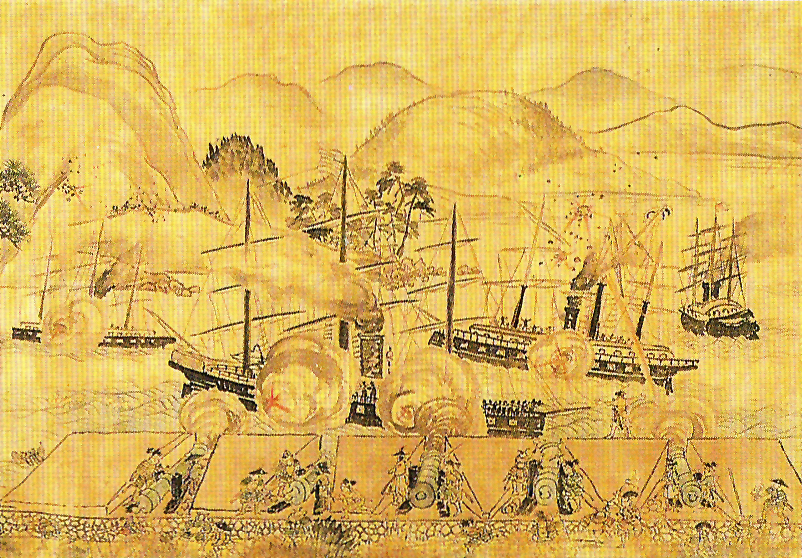
Choshu cannons firing on Western shipping in Shimonoseki. Japanese painting.

The order to expel barbarians (攘夷勅命 or 攘夷実行の勅命, jōi chokumei or jōi jikkō no chokumei) was an edict issued by the Japanese Emperor Kōmei in 1863 against the Westernization of Japan following the opening of the country by Commodore Matthew Perry in 1854.

== The order ==
The edict was based on widespread anti-foreign and legitimist sentiment, called the "Revere the Emperor, Expel the Barbarians" movement. Emperor Kōmei personally agreed with such sentiments, and – breaking with centuries of imperial tradition – began to take an active role in matters of state: as opportunities arose, he fulminated against the treaties and attempted to interfere in the shogunal succession. His efforts culminated on March 11, 1863, with his "Order to expel barbarians". A deadline for the expulsion was set two months later to May 11.

== Consequences ==
The Tokugawa shogunate had no intention of enforcing the order, and the edict inspired attacks against the shogunate itself as well as against foreigners in Japan. The most famous incident was the firing on foreign shipping in the Shimonoseki Strait off Chōshū Province as soon as the deadline was reached. Masterless samurai (rōnin) rallied to the cause, assassinating shogunate officials and Westerners. The killing of the English trader Charles Lennox Richardson is sometimes considered as a result of this policy. The Tokugawa government was forced to pay an indemnity of a hundred thousand British pounds demanded for Richardson's death.

But this turned out to be the zenith of the sonnō jōi movement, since the Western powers responded to Japanese attacks on western shipping with the Bombardment of Shimonoseki. Heavy reparations had earlier been demanded from Satsuma for the murder of Charles Lennox Richardson – the Namamugi Incident. When these were not forthcoming, a squadron of Royal Navy vessels went to the Satsuma port of Kagoshima to coerce the daimyō into paying. Instead, he opened fire on the ships from his shore batteries, and the squadron retaliated. This was later referred to, inaccurately, as the Bombardment of Kagoshima.

These events, however, also served to further weaken the shogunate, which appeared too powerless and compromising in its relations with Western powers. Ultimately the rebel provinces allied and overthrew the shogunate in the Boshin War and the subsequent Meiji Restoration.

== See also ==
- Bakumatsu
- Xenelasia
