= Kiri-sute gomen =

Part of the samurai code of honor

Kiri-sute gomen (斬捨御免 or 切捨御免) is a Japanese expression regarding the feudal era tradition of right to strike: the right of samurai to strike and potentially kill with their sword anyone of a lower class who compromised their honour. This right was abolished in 1876 during the Meiji Restoration, when the samurai class was disenfranchised by the imperial government.

== Etymology ==
Kiri-sute gomen translates literally as "authorization to cut and leave [the body of the victim]". Contrary to popular belief, this exact term did not originate in the Edo period. The real name used in historical sources is either uchi-sute (打捨; "to strike and abandon") or burei-uchi (無礼打; "to offend and strike").

== Conditions ==
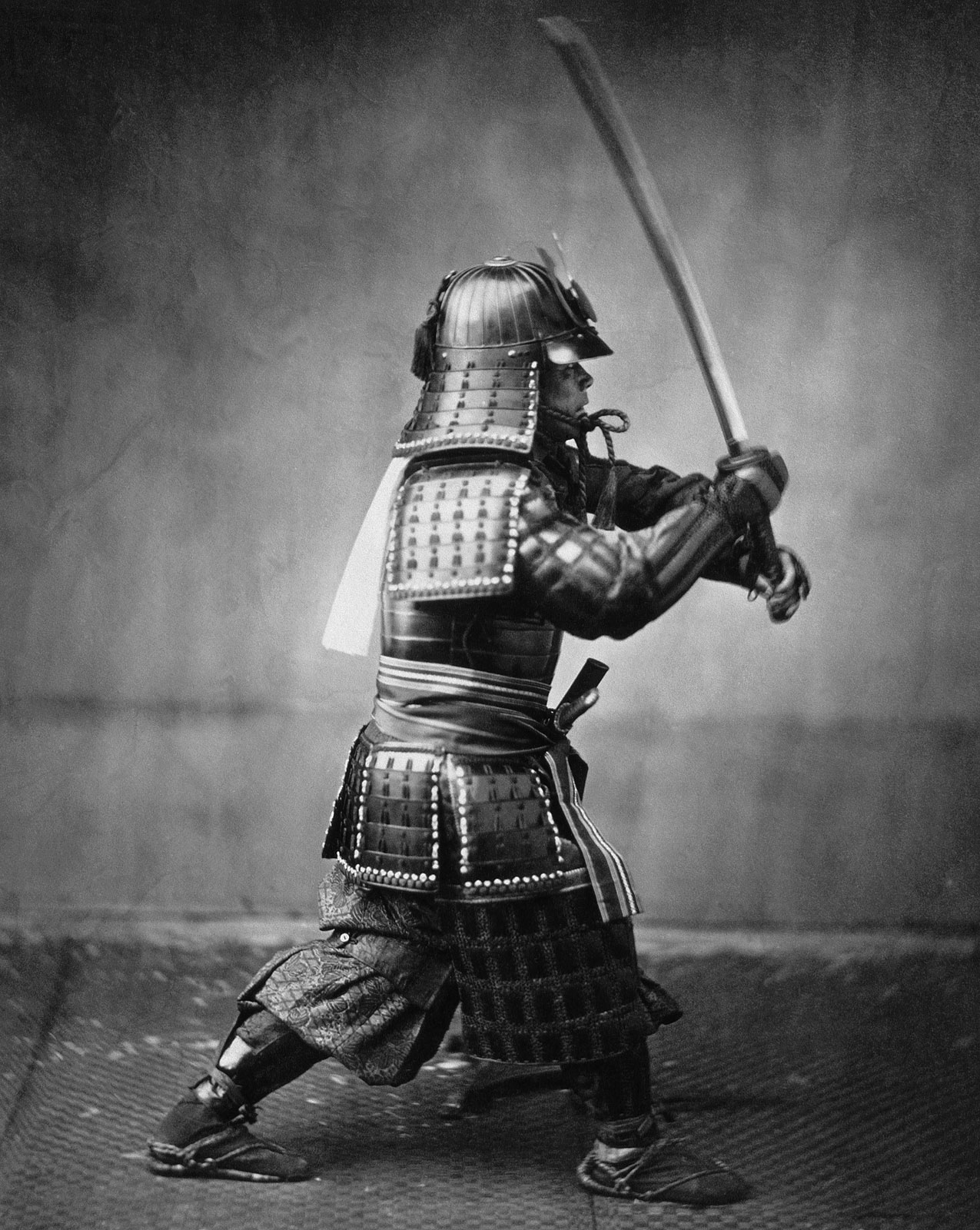
Armoured samurai with sword and dagger, c.1860

Because the right was defined as a form of self defence, kiri-sute gomen had a set of tight rules. The strike had to follow immediately after the offence, meaning that the striker could not attack someone for a past grievance or after a substantial amount of time. Also, due to the right being self-defence, it was not permissible to deliver a coup de grâce if a blow had been successfully applied.

Anyone who was at the receiving end had the right to defend themselves by wakizashi, a situation most common in the case of a higher samurai exercising the right against a lower-ranked samurai, as those would always carry wakizashi. Some professions, like doctors and midwives, were not eligible targets for kiri-sute gomen while at work or heading to their workplaces, as their jobs often required them to push the boundaries of honor. This exception was called torinuke gomen (通り抜け御免; "authorization to pass first").

In any case, the samurai performing the act had to prove that his action was right. After striking down his victim, the user was required to report the incident to a nearby government official, give his version of the facts, and provide at least one witness who corroborated it; he was expected to spend the next 20 days at home as proof of contrition. The last condition applied even after a favorable verdict, although it is unclear whether it applied to the physical author of the death or his superior in case the kill was performed by proxy. Moreover, the homicide weapon could be confiscated if an investigation was necessary or as a warning for a killer whose justification was feeble, and it was only given back after 20 days. Performing kiri-sute gomen without justification was severely punished. The guilty party could be dismissed from his job and could even be sentenced to death or forced to commit seppuku. His family would be affected too, if his properties and titles were removed from his inheritance.

== History ==
Samurai visiting Edo often did all they could to obtain favorable verdicts, as an unfavorable court decision there could be even considered an act of rebellion against the shogunate. It was usual that clan elders presented gifts to officials in order to secure their support, to the point that it was said magistrates earned more through those bribes than through their own salaries. It was also advisable for a samurai to go out accompanied by servants and other clan members who could serve as witnesses if it was necessary.

=== Notable incidents ===
A popular incident tells how a commoner bumped into Saiheiji Tomokai, treasurer of the Owari-Tokugawa family, and ignored him further when Tomokai demanded that he apologize. Feeling merciful, the samurai offered the peasant his wakizashi so he had a chance to defend himself, but instead, the commoner decided to run away with his wakizashi, causing further dishonor. The incident resulted in Tomo being disowned from the Owari-Tokugawa clan. He later sought out the commoner, collected the wakizashi and killed his entire family, before committing seppuku. This was far outside the bounds of kiri-sute gomen, and the Owari domain extinguished the entire Tomokai family as a consequence.

The Namamugi Incident (sometimes known as the "Kanagawa incident" or "Richardson affair") was a political crisis that followed the 1862 killing of British merchant Charles Lennox Richardson, who was killed by the armed retinue of Shimazu Hisamitsu, regent of the Satsuma Domain, on a road in Namamugi near Kawasaki. Europeans protested that the incident violated their extraterritoriality in Japan, while the Japanese argued Richardson had disrespected Shimazu and was justifiably killed under the kiri-sute gomen rule. British demands for compensation and failure by the Satsuma to respond resulted in the Bombardment of Kagoshima (or Anglo-Satsuma War) in August 1863.

Another happening involved a nobleman named Kuranosuke Toda, whose norimono was shoved by a commoner trying to cross through. Toda's bodyguard demanded an apology, but the peasant insulted them instead. The samurai then threw him to the ground, but the peasant still started a shouting match. Watching it from his litter, Toda ordered the man to be cut down. After reporting the incident, the judges approved Toda's decision and did not condemn him. An instance of Kiri sute gomen is described in the story of the Hōgyū Jizō statue. A boy, whose father was killed by Kiri sute gomen, made 100 stone statues in later life, in Kumamoto.

== See also ==
- Deadly force
- Honour killing
- Private war
- Summary execution
- Tsujigiri
