= John Tarleton (Royal Navy officer) =

British Royal Navy admiral (1811–1880)

Admiral Sir John Tarleton KCB
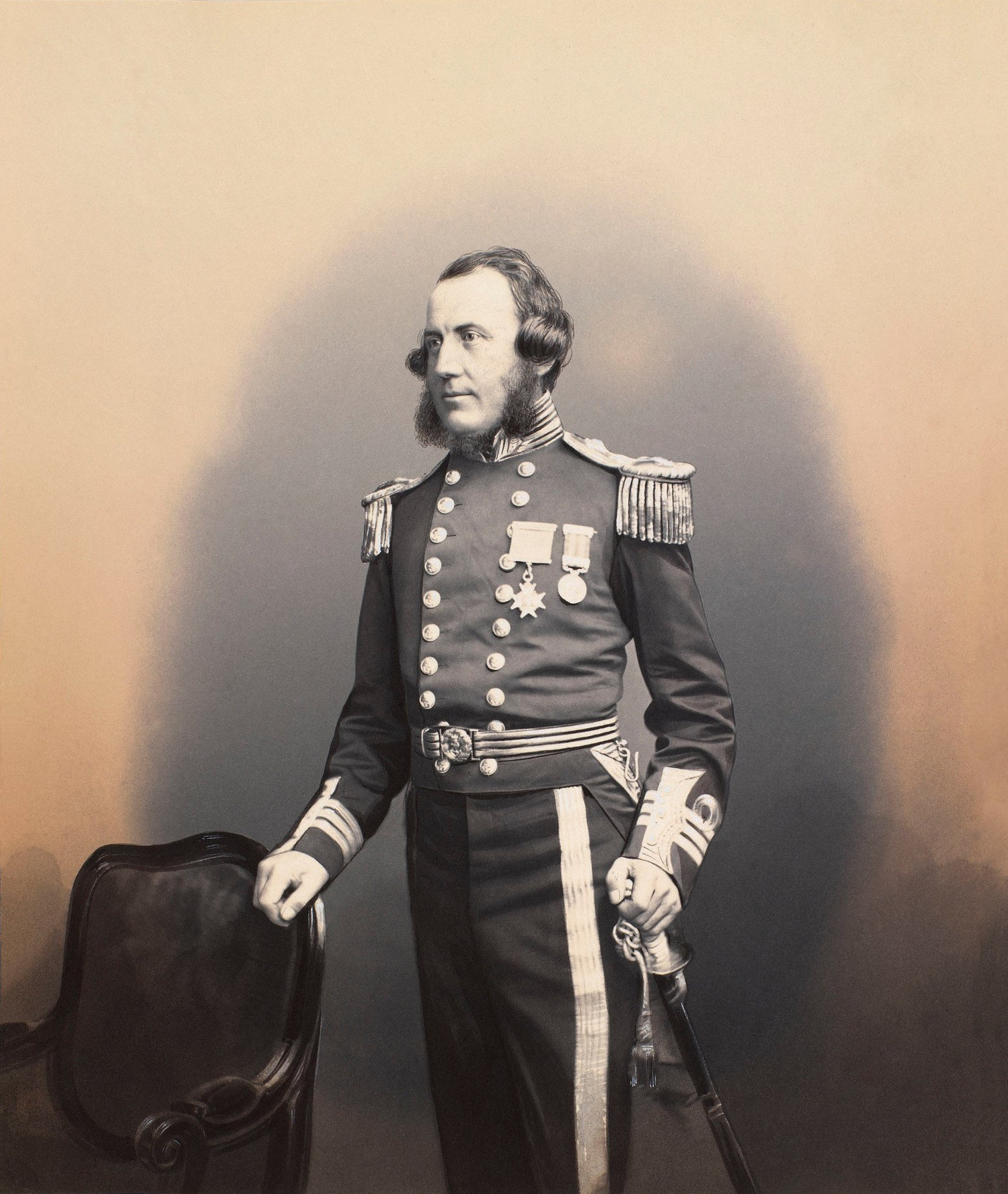
- 1860 photograph by John Jabez Edwin Mayall
- Born: 8 November 1811
- Died: 25 September 1880 (aged 68); London, United Kingdom
- Military career
- Allegiance: United Kingdom
- Branch: Royal Navy
- Service years: 1824–1879
- Rank: Admiral
- Commands: HMS Fox; HMS Eurydice; HMS Euryalus; Lord of the Admiralty; Admiral-Superintendent of Naval Reserves
- Conflicts: Second Anglo-Burmese War

Admiral Sir John Walter Tarleton KCB (8 November 1811 – 25 September 1880) was a Royal Navy officer who went on to be Second Naval Lord.

== Naval career ==
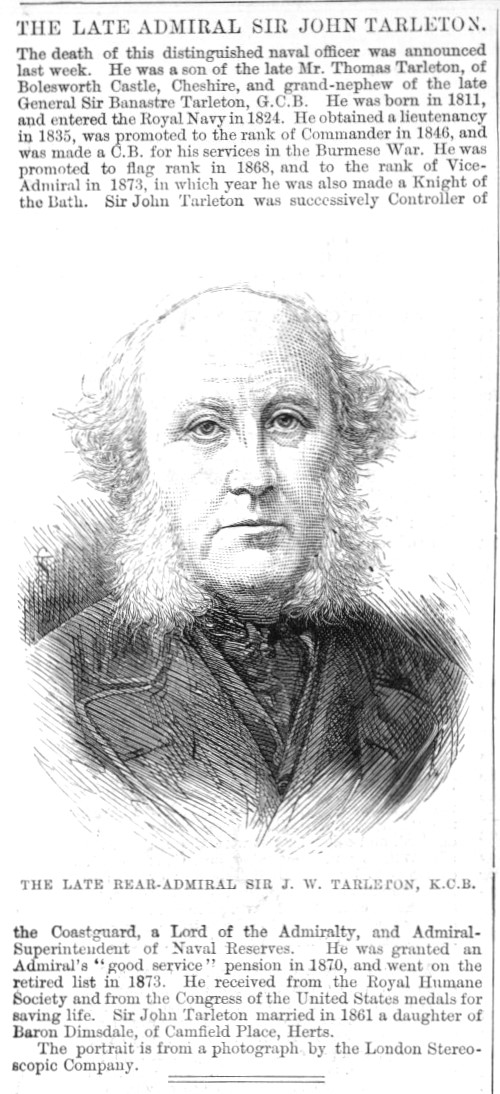
The obituary from The Illustrated London News, 1880

John Walter Tarleton was the son of Thomas Tarleton of Bolesworth Castle and grandnephew of Sir Banastre Tarleton. He joined the Royal Navy in 1824. He played a key role in resolving a crisis in Burma in 1851 when the master of a British ship was illegally detained in Rangoon.

He was given command of the fifth-rate HMS Fox in 1852, of the frigate HMS Eurydice in 1855 and of the frigate HMS Euryalus in 1858: he led the latter ship as an element of the Channel Squadron and then of the Mediterranean Squadron. At this time Prince Alfred served as a cadet under him. Tarleton served as Junior Naval Lord from 1871 and then as Second Naval Lord from 1872 to 1874. He was promoted to Vice Admiral in 1875 and retired in 1876.

He died on 25 September 1880 at his home in Warwick Square in London aged 69.

== Family ==
In 1861 he married Finetta Esther Dinsdale; they went on to have one son and two daughters.

== See also ==
- O'Byrne, William Richard (1849). "Tarleton, John Walter" . A Naval Biographical Dictionary . John Murray – via Wikisource.

Military offices
| Preceded by Lord John Hay | Junior Naval Lord; 1871–1872 | Succeeded by Sir Beauchamp Seymour |
| Preceded by Vacant; Last held by Sir Sydney Dacres | Second Naval Lord; 1872–1874 | Succeeded by Sir Geoffrey Hornby |
