= Bombardment of Kagoshima =

1863 naval battle between Britain and the Satsuma Domain of Japan

Coordinates: 31.5955°N 130.5481°E

- Part of the Bakumatsu
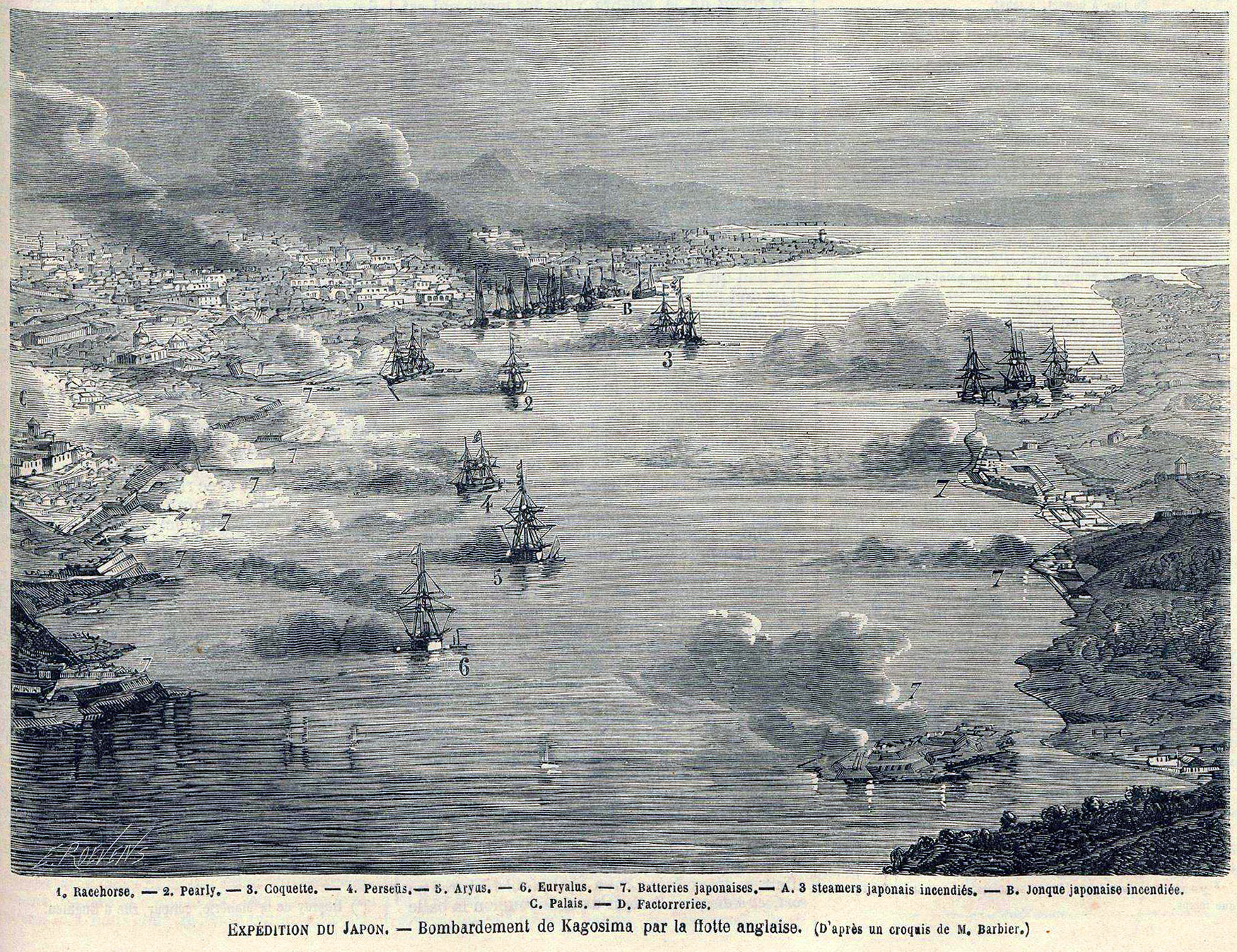
- Bird's-eye view of the bombardment of Kagoshima by the Royal Navy, 15 August 1863. Le Monde Illustré.
Date	15–17 August 1863 (2 days)
Location	Kagoshima, Satsuma Domain
Result	See Aftermath

Belligerents
United Kingdom	Satsuma Domain

Commanders and leaders
Augustus Kuper	Shimazu Hisamitsu

Strength
7 warships	1 coastal battery

Casualties and losses
13 killed; 59 wounded	5 killed; 3 merchant ships destroyed
- 5 junks destroyed

The Bombardment of Kagoshima, also known as the Anglo-Satsuma War (薩英戦争, Satsu-Ei Sensō), was a military engagement fought between Britain and the Satsuma Domain in Kagoshima from 15 to 17 August 1863. The British were attempting to extract compensation and legal justice from daimyo Shimazu Tadayoshi for the 1862 Namamugi incident.

The engagement began when a Royal Navy fleet commanded by Sir Augustus Kuper was fired on from Satsuma coastal batteries near Kagoshima. The British retaliated by bombarding the city, but were unable to gain a conclusive victory and retreated two days later. The Satsuma declared victory and, after negotiations, fulfilled some British demands regarding the Namamugi incident.

== Background ==
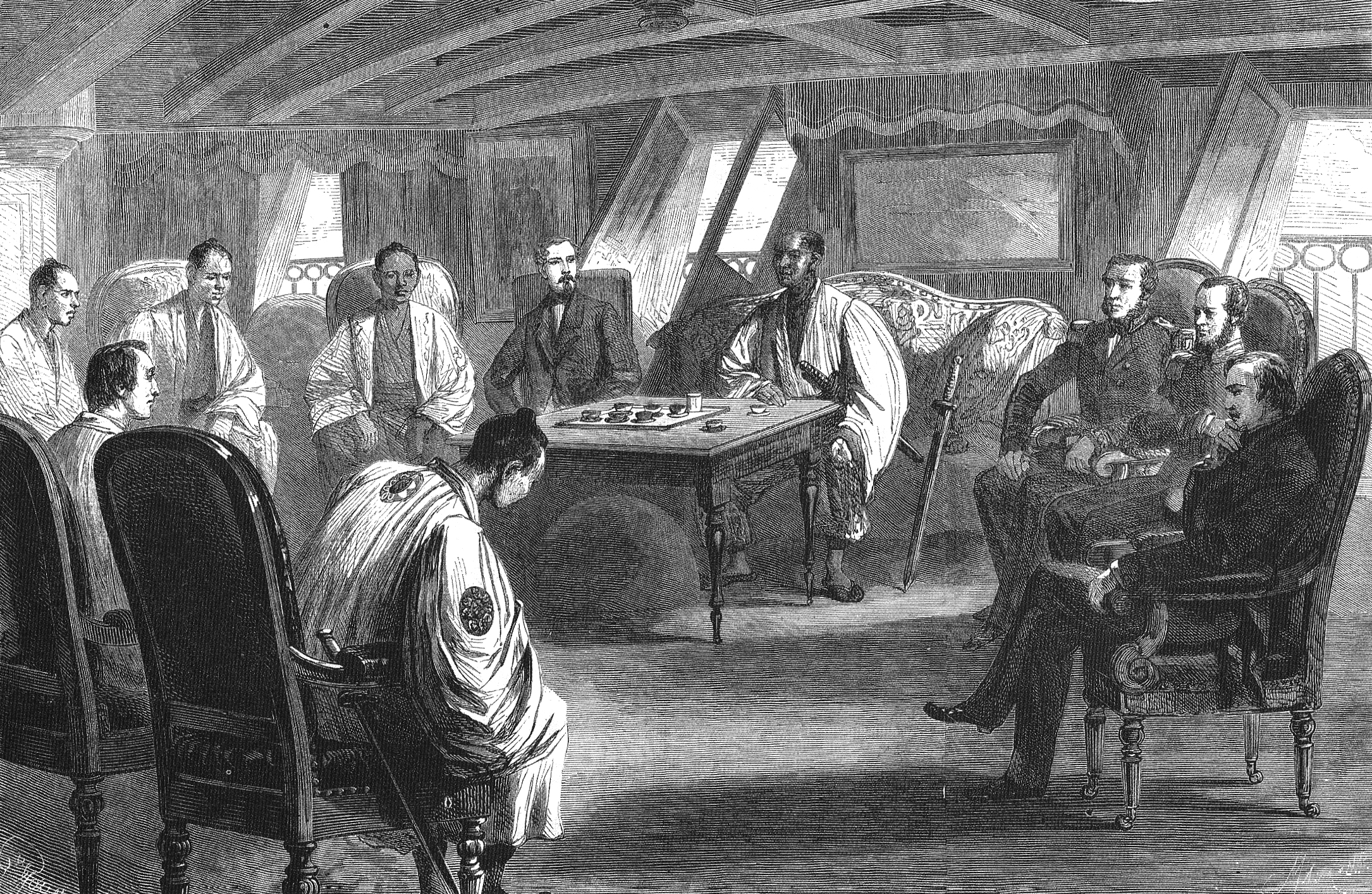
An illustration of the negotiation onboard French Navy warship Sémiramis between the Tokugawa shogunate and Britain and France on 2 July 1863. Among the European negotiators is Edward St. John Neale, Gustave Duchesne de Bellecourt, Benjamin Jaurès and Sir Augustus Kuper.

On 14 September 1862, a confrontation occurred in Japan between a British merchant, Charles Lennox Richardson, and the entourage of Shimazu Hisamitsu, father and regent of Satsuma daimyo Shimazu Tadayoshi. After Richardson ignored warnings to stay out of the entourage's way while travelling on a road near Kawasaki, Kanagawa, he was killed by Hisamitsu's retainers under the traditional Kiri-sute gomen right, which allowed samurai to kill anyone in a lower social class for perceived disrespect. Richardson's murder sparked outrage from Westerners in Japan due to its violation of the extraterritoriality they enjoyed under terms of the "unequal treaties".

Edward St. John Neale, the British chargé d'affaires, demanded from the Bakufu (the central government of the Tokugawa shogunate) an apology and indemnity of £100,000 as reparations for Richardson's murder; the sum demanded by Neale represented roughly a third of the annual revenues of the Bakufu. Neale also threatened to the Japanese capital of Edo with a naval bombardment if the indemnity was not paid, and further demanded that the Satsuma Domain arrest and place on trial the perpetrators of Richardson's murder, along with £25,000 compensation for the surviving victims of the incident and the relatives of Richardson.

At the time, the Bakufu was led by Ogasawara Nagamichi, governing in the absence of Shogun Tokugawa Iemochi, who was then in Kyoto. Eager to resolve the dispute over Richardson's murder, Ogasawara entered into a negotiation with France and Great Britain on 2 July 1863 onboard the French Navy warship Sémiramis. The European participants in the negotiations were Neale, Gustave Duchesne de Bellecourt, Benjamin Jaurès and Sir Augustus Kuper. Ogasawara issued an apology for the murder and paid the indemnity demanded by Neale.

However, the Satsuma Domain refused to comply with Neale's demands for an apology, £25,000 in compensation and placing the two samurai responsible for Richardson's murder on trial, arguing that disrespect to the daimyo was typically sanctioned by the death of the offending parties. Legally, their argument was invalid, as Westerners in Japan were exempted from Japanese laws and customs due to extraterritoriality arising from various treaties signed between the Bakufu and Western powers since the beginning of the Bakumatsu period.

Several violent confrontations between Westerners and the Japanese had already occurred throughout the country during this period, spurred on by Emperor Kōmei's 1863 "Order to expel barbarians". The Kanmon Straits had witnessed several attacks on American, Dutch and French merchant ships, which prompted punitive expeditions by these countries, with U.S. Navy frigate USS Wyoming, Dutch Navy warship Medusa, and French Navy warships Tancrède and Dupleix launching attacks on Japanese positions.

=== Further negotiations ===
Following protracted and fruitless negotiations with the Satsuma Domain that had taken over a year, Neale eventually had had enough. Under instructions from his superiors in the British government, he ordered Kuper to use military action to compel Satsuma into complying with his demands. After being informed of the British plans, the Bakufu asked for a delay in its implementation:

On receipt of your despatch of the 3rd of August, we fully understood that you intend to go within three days to the territory of the Prince of Satsuma with the men-of-war now lying in the Bay of Yokohama, to demand satisfaction for the murder of a British merchant on the Tokaido last year. But owing to the present unsettled state of affairs in our empire, which you witness and hear of, we are in great trouble, and intend to carry out several plans. Supposing, now, something untoward were to happen, then all the trouble both you and we have taken would have been in vain and fruitless; therefore we request that the said departure may be delayed for the present. Edo, 4th of August, signed by four Minister of Foreign Affairs of the Shogunate.

On the 5th, a Bakufu vice-minister from Edo visited Neale, but far from further opposing the planned British expedition against the Satsuma Domain, actually informed Neale that the Tokugawa shogunate intended to send one of its warships to join forces with Kuper's squadron. The steamer in question, however, ultimately did not join the expedition.

=== British departure ===
Kuper's Royal Navy squadron left Yokohama on 6 August. It was composed of the flagship HMS Euryalus (with Neale on board), HMS Pearl, HMS Perseus, HMS Argus, HMS Coquette, HMS Racehorse, and the gunboat HMS Havock. They sailed for Kagoshima and anchored in the deep waters of Kinko Bay on August 11. Satsuma Domain envoys came aboard Euryalus, and letters were exchanged, with Kuper pressing for a resolution satisfactory to his demands within 24 hours. The Satsuma Domain prevaricated, refusing to comply for various reasons.

== Bombardment ==
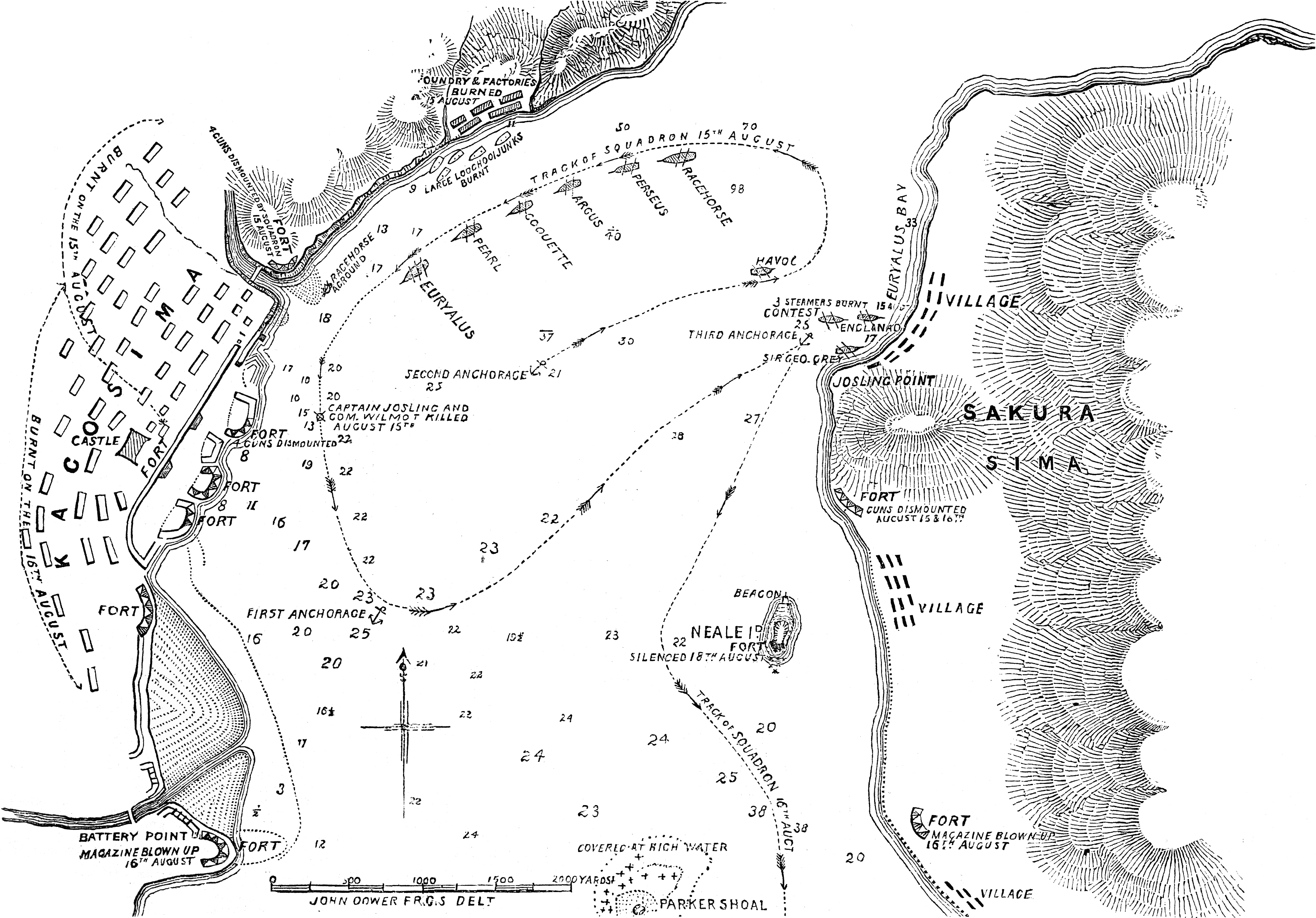
A map of the bombardment

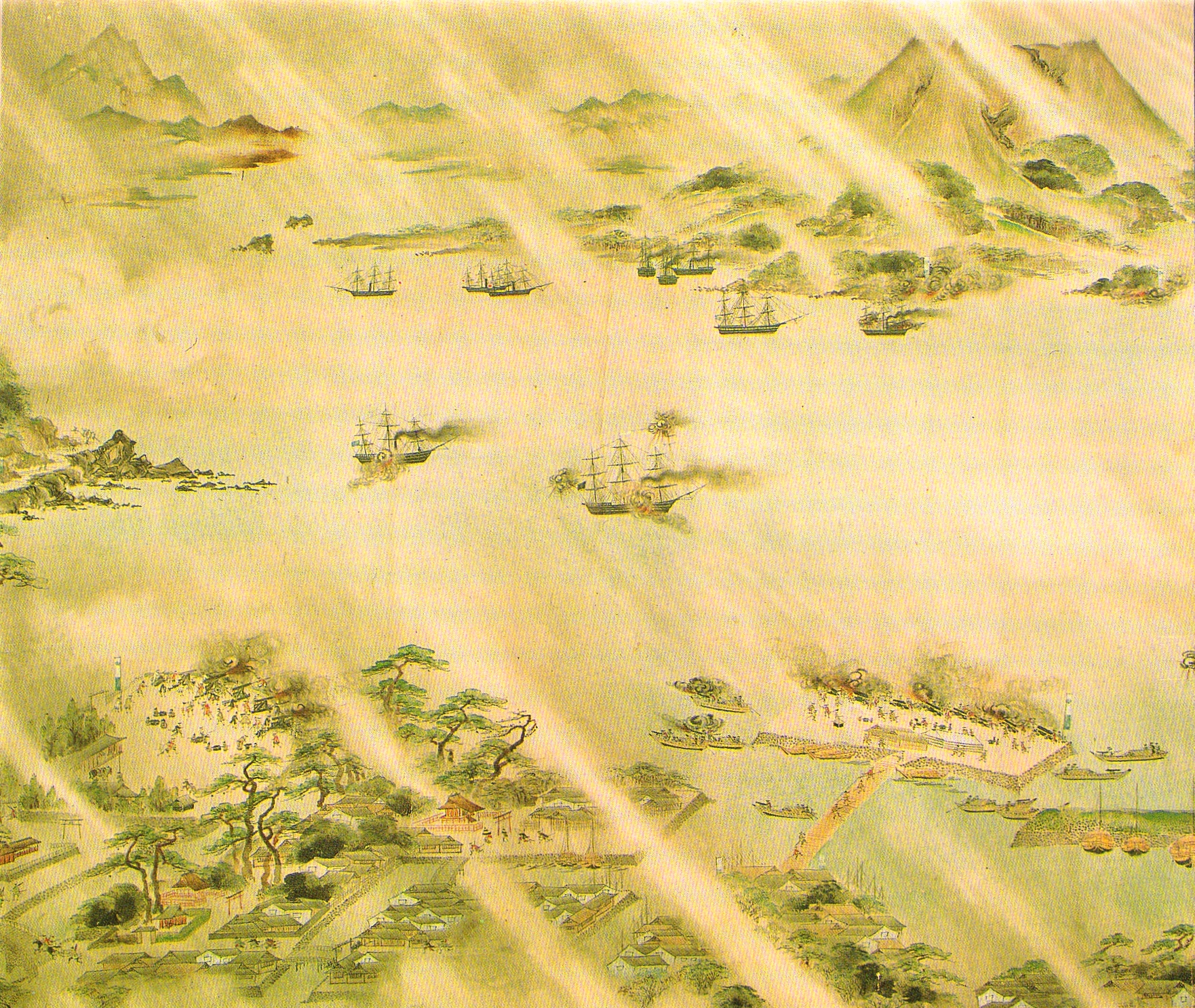
A Japanese painting of the bombardment

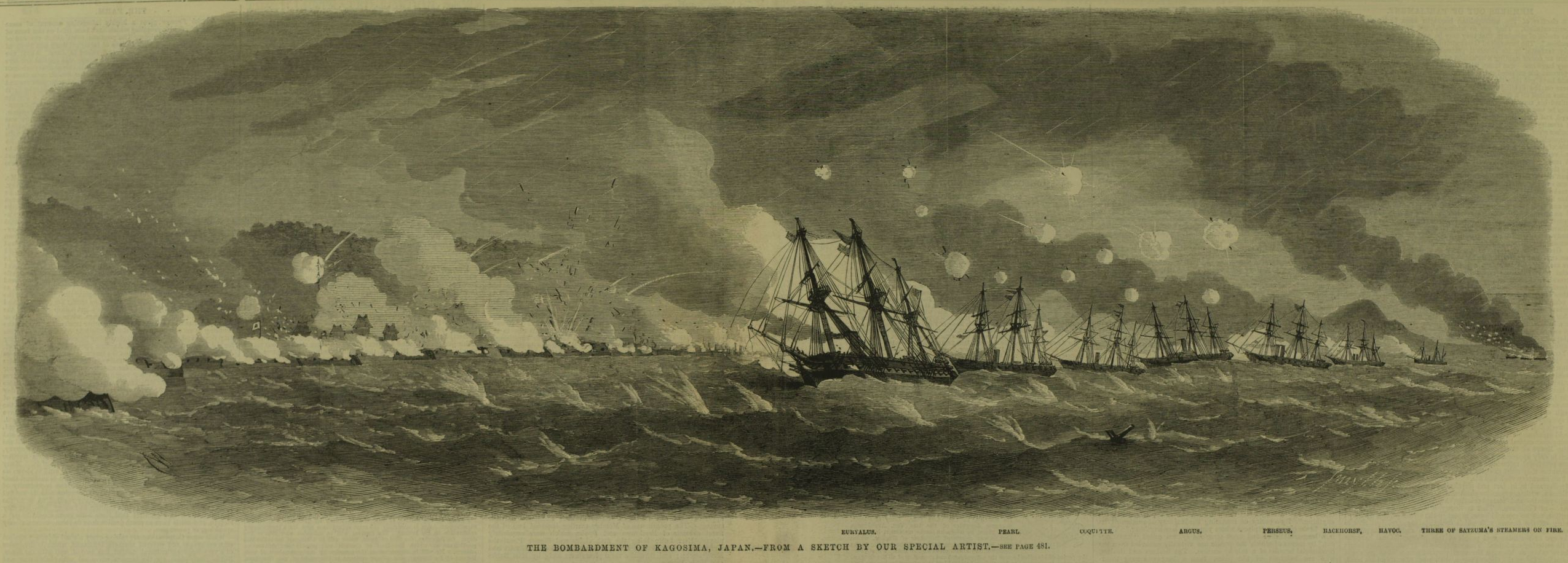
An illustration of the start of the bombardment

After Kuper's deadline expired without a satisfactory conclusion to his demands, he decided to proceed with the plans to punish the Satsuma Domain. His squadron weighed anchor and proceeded to seize three British-built merchant steamers lying at anchor in Kagoshima harbour which were owned by the Satsuma Domain: the Sir George Grey, Contest and England, with the ships having an aggregate value of £200,000. Kuper intended to use the three seized merchantmen as a bargaining chip in any future negotiations.

In response, the Satsuma Domain's military forces responded by waiting until a typhoon started before launching an artillery bombardment from their coastal batteries towards the British (the city had been evacuated prior to the engagement). Surprised by the hostility, Kuper's squadron responded by confiscating as much valuable materiel as possible from the three captured steamers before setting them on fire.

The British then spent approximately two hours readying their ships for battle (as they had not expected to enter into a military confrontation) before forming a line of battle, which sailed along the Kagoshima coast and fired a combination of shells and round shot towards the coastal batteries. Artillery fire from the Havoc set five Ryukyuan trading junks, which were not involved in the engagement, on fire. The Satsuma coastal batteries were slowly silenced by the British, though Kuper's squadron had not been expecting protracted resistance and had insufficient supplies and ammunition; eventually he gave the order to retreat. The engagement resulted in 5 killed on the Satsuma side and 13 killed and 69 wounded on the British side, including Captain Josling of the Euryalus and his second-in-command Commander Wilmot, both decapitated by the same cannonball.

Additionally, roughly 500 Minka houses in Kagoshima, making up approximately 5% of the city's urban area, were destroyed by the bombardment, along with the Ryukyuan embassy. The British retreat was face-saving for the Satsuma Domain, which claimed the engagement as a victory by taking into account the relative number of casualties. Kuper's squadron did not land marines nor seize cannons from the coastal batteries (which would have signalled a clear British victory), Kuper having decided that the bombardment was enough.

== Aftermath ==
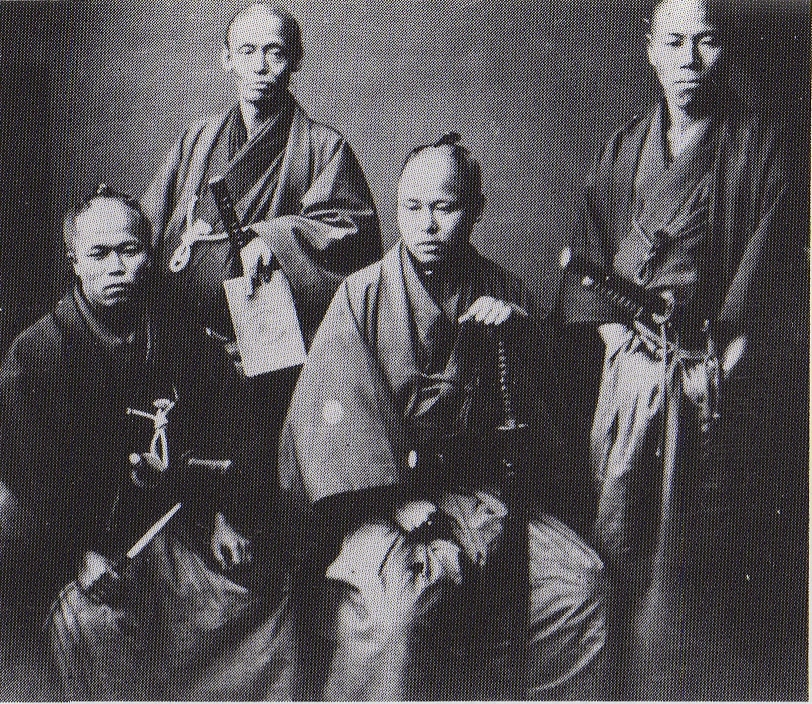
The Satsuma negotiators who sealed the final agreement with Britain

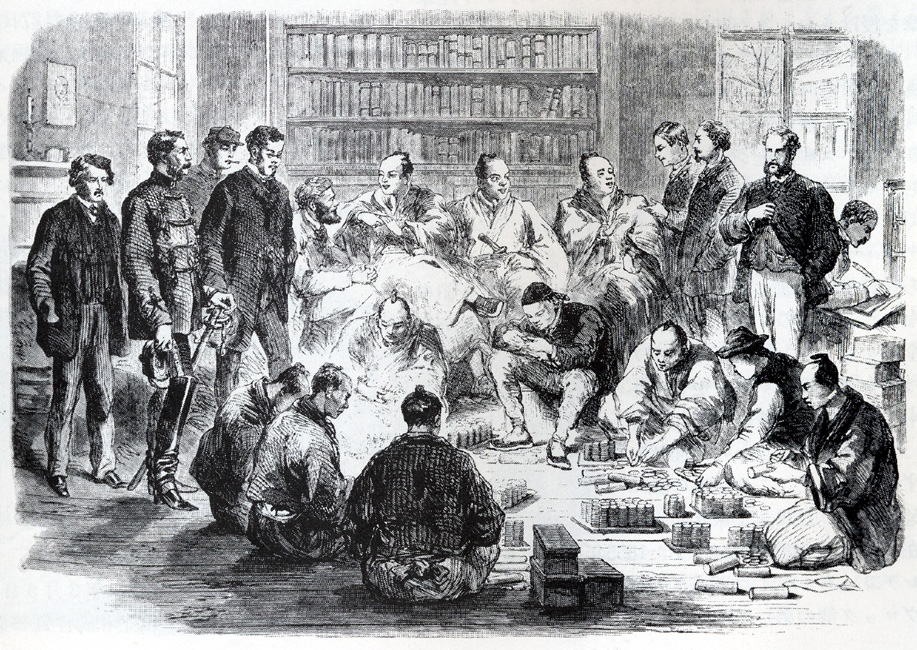
The payment of the Satsuma indemnity

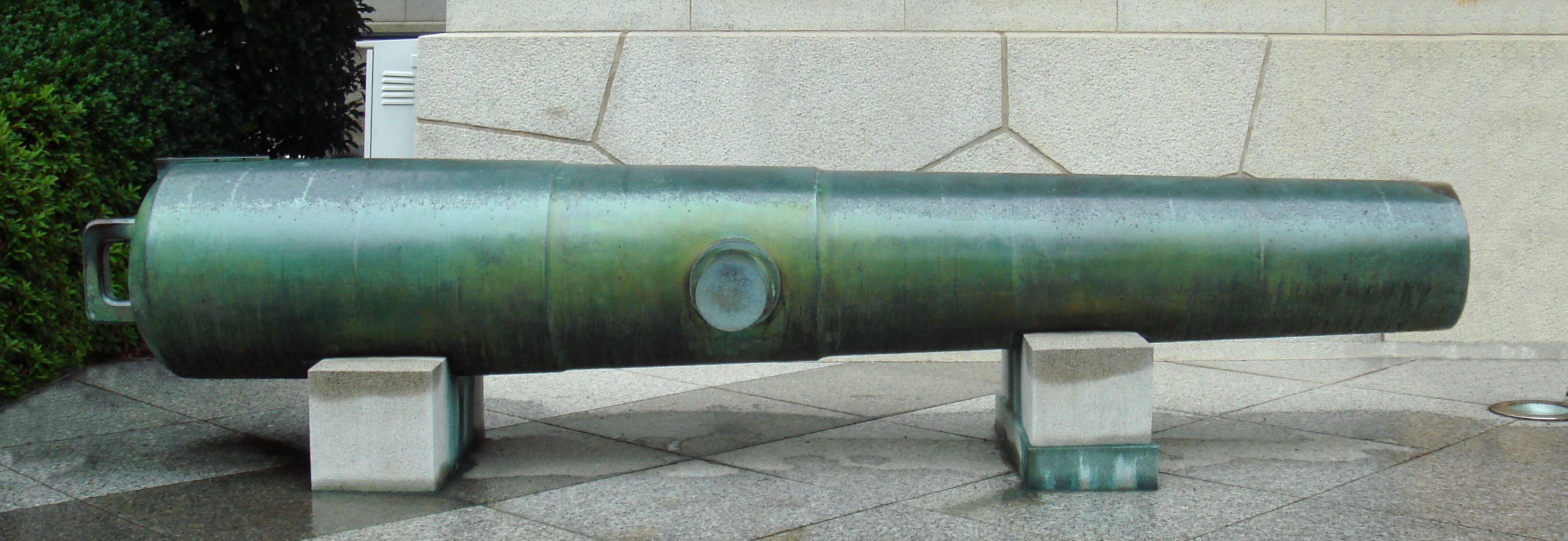
A 150-pound Satsuma cannon, cast in 1849. It was mounted on Fort Tenpozan at Kagoshima. Calibre: 290 mm, length: 4220 mm.

Satsuma eventually decided to give in to Neale's demands and paid £25,000 to the British (which they borrowed from the Bakufu and never repaid due to the fall of the Tokugawa shogunate in 1869 and its replacement by the Meiji government). They never identified nor placed on trial Richardson's killers, but despite this, the reparation received was enough for Britain to sign a treaty with the Satsuma Domain to supply the latter with steam warships. Ironically, the conflict became the starting point of a friendly relationship between the Satsuma Domain and Britain, which became major allies in the ensuing Boshin War. From the start, the Satsuma Province had generally been in favour of the opening and westernization of Japan.

During this exchange, mandarins from Satsuma were introduced to the British. It is speculated that the Satsuma mandarin came to be known in the United Kingdom as the "Satsuma" because of an gift to the British during the peace negotiations.

== See also ==
- Ishibashi Park
- Japan–United Kingdom relations
- Shimazu clan

== Bibliography ==
- De Lange, William (2020). The Namamugi Incident: The Murder that Sparked a War, Toyo Press. ISBN 978-9492722-270
- Denney, John (2011), Respect and Consideration: Britain in Japan 1853–1868 and Beyond Radiance Press, ISBN 978-0-9568798-0-6.
- Howe, Christopher (1996), The Origins of Japanese Trade Supremacy: Development and Technology in Asia from 1540 to the Pacific War, C. Hurst & Co. Publishers, ISBN 978-1-85065538-1.
- Polak, Christian (2001). Soie et lumières: L'âge d'or des échanges franco-japonais (des origines aux années 1950). Tokyo: Chambre de Commerce et d'Industrie Française du Japon, Hachette, Fujin Gahōsha (アシェット婦人画報社).
- ——— (2002), 絹と光: 知られざる日仏交流100年の歴史 (江戶時代–1950年代) [Kinu to hikariō: shirarezaru Nichi-Futsu kōryū 100-nen no rekishi (Edo jidai–1950-nendai)] (in Japanese), Tokyo: Ashetto Fujin Gahōsha, ISBN 978-4-573-06210-8, OCLC 50875162
- Rennie, David Field (2005), The British Arms in North China and Japan Originally pub. 1864. Facsimile, Adamant Media Corporation, ISBN 1-4021-8184-1
- Satow, Ernest. "The Bombardment of Kagoshima", Chapter VIII, A Diplomat in Japan.
- Totman, Conrad 1980 The collapse of the Tokugawa Bakufu, 1862–1868 University of Hawai Press, Honolulu, ISBN 0-8248-0614-X
- Zwier, Lawrence J.; Cunningham, Mark E. (2013), The End of the Shoguns and the Birth of Modern Japan: Pivotal Moments in History (rev. ed.), Twenty-First Century Books, ISBN 978-1-46770377-2.
