= Opium War (disambiguation) =

The Opium Wars refer to the mid-1800s conflicts between Western powers and China including the First Opium War (1839–1842) and the Second Opium War (1856–1860).

Opium War(s) or The Opium War(s) may also refer to:

- 1967 Opium War, conflict between marooned elements of the Kuomintang (Chinese Nationalist Party) and the Kingdom of Laos
- The Opium War (film), a 1997 Chinese film about the First Opium War or about the collective two wars in China
- Opium War (2008 film), a 2008 Afghan film about opium farming and conflict in modern Afghanistan
- The Opium Wars: Drugs, Dreams and the Making of China, a 2011 book about the First and Second Opium Wars by Julia Lovell

== See also ==
- Opium War Museum, Humen, Guangdong, China
- War on Drugs, including opioids such as opium
- Opium (disambiguation)
- War (disambiguation)
