= Ishibashi Park =

Park in Kagoshima, Japan

Coordinates: 31°36′15.6″N 130°34′6.7″E

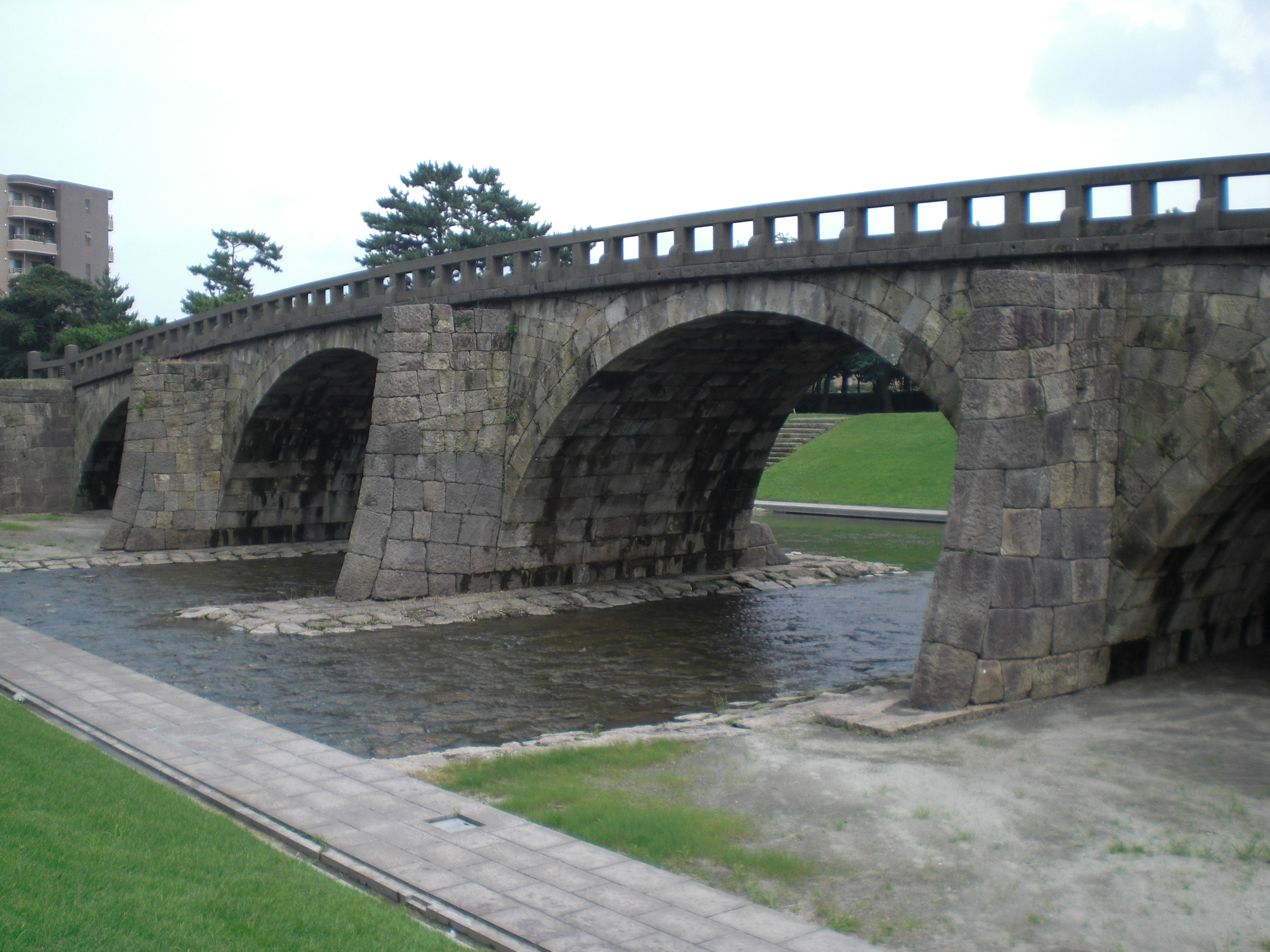
Ishibashi Park

Ishibashi Park (石橋記念公園, Ishibashi Kinen Kōen) is a park in Hama-machi, Kagoshima, Japan. At the end of the Edo period (late 19th century), local lord Shimazu Shigehide had five bridges, collectively called the Gosekkyō ("five stone bridges"), built across the Kōtsuki River. Two of them collapsed in floods in 1993. The remaining three were moved to a new location and restored. Ishibashi Park consists of these three bridges and a museum.

== History ==
On August 6, 1993, torrential rain in Kagoshima Prefecture led to flooding that caused two of the five bridges, Takeno-bashi Bridge and Shinkan-bashi Bridge, to collapse. The other three bridges, Tamae-bashi Bridge, Nishida-bashi Bridge, and Kōrai-bashi Bridge, also suffered enormous damage.

After the flooding, the three bridges that withstood it were moved to a new location where they could be repaired, restored and better protected. In 2000, this place was opened as Ishibashi Park.

== Outline ==
The park is at the mouth of the Inari River, next to Japan National Route 10, and was originally a location for the Gion-no-su gun battery used during the Anglo-Satsuma War in 1863.

Nishida-bashi Bridge is the nearest bridge to the memorial hall. A large amount of money was spent on it, because the daimyōs (territorial lords) used it when travelling on sankin-kōtai, which obligated lords to live for a year alternately in Edo (Tokyo) and in their own feudal domains, to show their loyalty to the shogunate. Kōrai-bashi Bridge connected Kajiya-chō and Kōrai-chō, where there lived many samurai who would later overthrow the Tokugawa shogunate. Of the three bridges, Tamae-bashi Bridge, which was originally furthest upstream but now closest to the sea, retains most of the original features of the stone bridges.

The park also has a statue of Iwanaga Sangorō, the mason from Higo Province (present-day Kumamoto) who built the five bridges.

== See also ==
- Satsuma Domain
- Shimazu clan
- Bombardment of Kagoshima
