= Opium (disambiguation) =

Opium is a plant latex that is a source of narcotic analgesic drugs.

Opium may also refer to:

- Afyonkarahisar, Turkish city formerly known as Afyon (Opium)
- Opium poppy, the plant from which opium is obtained
- Opium (perfume)

== Film ==
- Opium (1919 film), a 1919 German film
- Opium (1949 film), a 1949 Mexican crime film
- Opium: Diary of a Madwoman, a 2007 Hungarian film

== Music ==
- Opium (KMFDM album), 1984
- Opium (Ottmar Liebert album), 1996
- Opium (Bill Dixon, Franz Koglmann, and Steve Lacy album), 2001
- Opium (Matt Berry album), 2008
- Opium (Jay-Jay Johanson album), 2015
- Opium, a 1995 album by Russian rock band Agatha Christie
- "Opium" (Moonspell song), 1996
- "Opium" (Serebro song), 2008
- "Opium", a song by Marcy Playground on their 1997 self-titled album
- "Opium", a song by moe. on their 2001 album Dither
- "Opium", a song by Scooter on their 2016 album Ace
- "Opium", a song by Gorillaz on their 2020 album Song Machine, Season One: Strange Timez
- Opium, a record label founded by American rapper and singer Playboi Carti
- "Opium", from the Anastasis album by Dead Can Dance, 2012

== Literature ==
- Opium, a fictional country situated between Aztlán, Mexico and the United States in Nancy Farmer's novel The House of the Scorpion (2002)
- Opium, graphic novel by the Spanish comic book artist Daniel Torres
- "Opium", a 1980 short story by Harlan Ellison

== See also ==
- Opiates, drugs derived from opium
- Opioids, drugs similar to opiates
