= Ishibashi (surname) =

Ishibashi (written: 石橋 lit. "stone bridge") is a Japanese surname. Notable people with the surname include:

- Akira Ishibashi (石橋 顕, born 1973), Japanese sailor
- Anna Ishibashi (born 1992), Japanese model and actress
- Brittany Ishibashi (born 1980), American actress
- Chiaki Ishibashi (石橋 千彰, born 1991), Japanese swimmer
- Eiko Ishibashi, Japanese musician
- Kaoru Ishibashi (born 1975) also known as Kishi Bashi, is a singer, instrumentalist, and songwriter
- Katsuhiko Ishibashi (born 1944), Japanese professor and seismologist
- Hajime Ishibashi (石橋甫, 1862–1942), Japanese Vice-Admiral
- Ishibashi Ningetsu (1865–1926), Japanese author
- Manabu Ishibashi (born 1992), Japanese cyclist
- Masashi Ishibashi (石橋雅史, 1933–2018), Japanese actor and a martial artist
- Masashi Ishibashi (politician) (石橋 政嗣, 1924–2019), Japanese politician
- Naoki Ishibashi (born 1981), former Japanese football player
- Paula Ishibashi (born 1985), Brazilian rugby union player
- Ryo Ishibashi (born 1956), Japanese actor
- Shizuka Ishibashi (born 1994), Japanese actress and dancer
- Sachio Ishibashi, professional shogi player
- Shōjirō Ishibashi (1889–1976), Japanese businessman and founder of Bridgestone
- Takaaki Ishibashi, (born 1961), Japanese actor/singer
- Tanzan Ishibashi (1884–1973), 55th Prime Minister of Japan
- Yoshimasa Ishibashi (born 1968), Japanese artist
- Yoshimi Ishibashi (born 1949), Japanese race car driver
- Yui Ishibashi (石橋 唯今, born 1996), Japanese field hockey player
- Yūko Ishibashi (born 1980), Japanese singer
