= HMS Euryalus (1853) =

Frigate of the Royal Navy

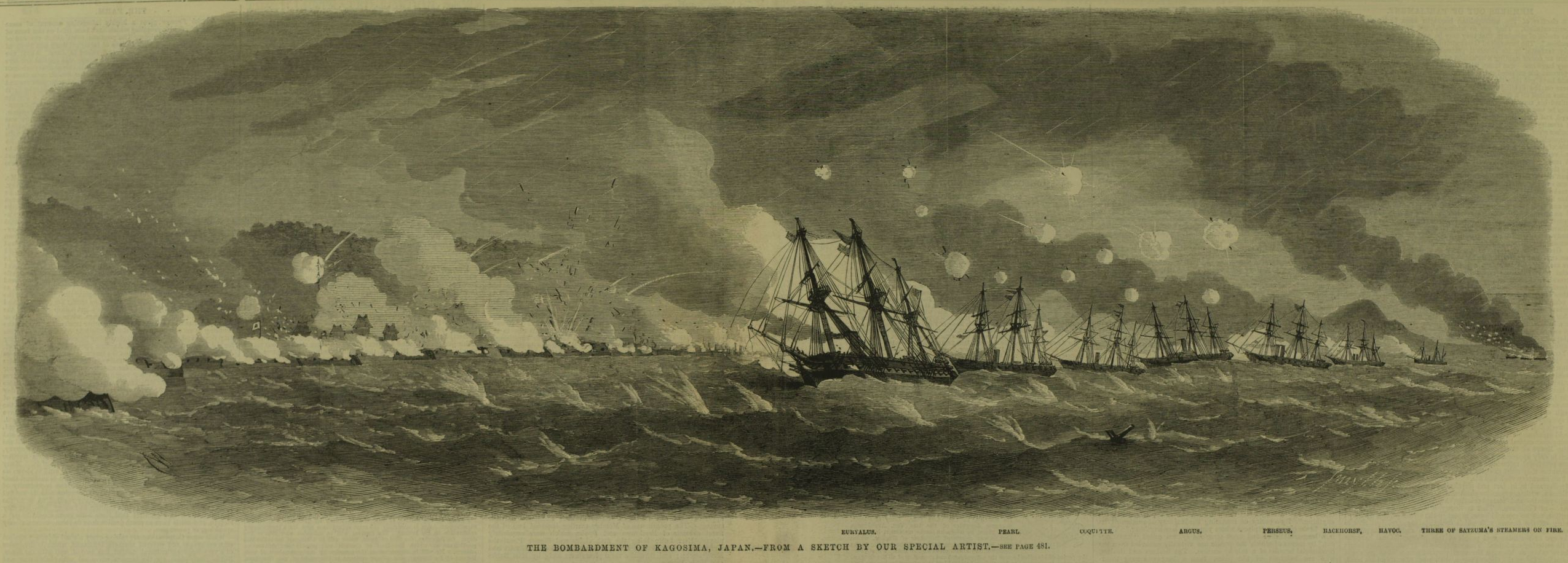
- Euryalus leading the line of battle during the Bombardment of Kagoshima, 1863

History

United Kingdom
- Name: HMS Euryalus
- Namesake: Euryalus
- Builder: Chatham Dockyard
- Launched: 5 October 1853
- Decommissioned: 23 September 1865
- Fate: Broken up, 1867

General characteristics
- Type: Screw frigate
- Displacement: 3,125 tons
- Tons burthen: 2,371 tons bm
- Length: 212 ft (65 m) o/a
- Beam: 50 ft 2 in (15.29 m)
- Depth: 16 ft 9 in (5.11 m)
- Propulsion: Steam engine, 400 hp (300 kW), single screw
- Speed: 12 knots (22 km/h; 14 mph)
- Complement: 515
- Armament: Main-deck: 28 × 8-inch (204 mm) 65 cwt guns; Quarter-deck and forecastle: 22 × 32-pounder guns

HMS Euryalus was a fourth-rate wooden-hulled screw frigate of the Royal Navy, with a 400-horsepower (300 kW) steam engine that could make over 12 knots (22 km/h; 14 mph). She was launched at Chatham in 1853, was 212 feet long, displaced 3,125 tons and had a complement of 515 (this varied slightly as the Naval Standards varied). At the time of the Bombardment of Kagoshima she carried 35 guns, not counting approximately 16 carronades. Seventeen of her guns were breech-loading Armstrong guns. She carried 230 tons of coal, and provisions for about three months, together with over 70 tons of shot and shell.

== Service history ==
In December 1853, George Ramsay was appointed captain. The ship served in the Baltic Campaign in 1854–1855.

On 2 April 1855 she gave HMS Imperieuse a tow, after the ship had run aground; the previous day, off the Reefness Lighthouse (Røsnæs lighthouse) in Kalundborg, Denmark.

As part of the Anglo-French fleet, she took part in the Bombardment of Sveaborg (now Suomenlinna, Finland) on 7–9 August 1855.

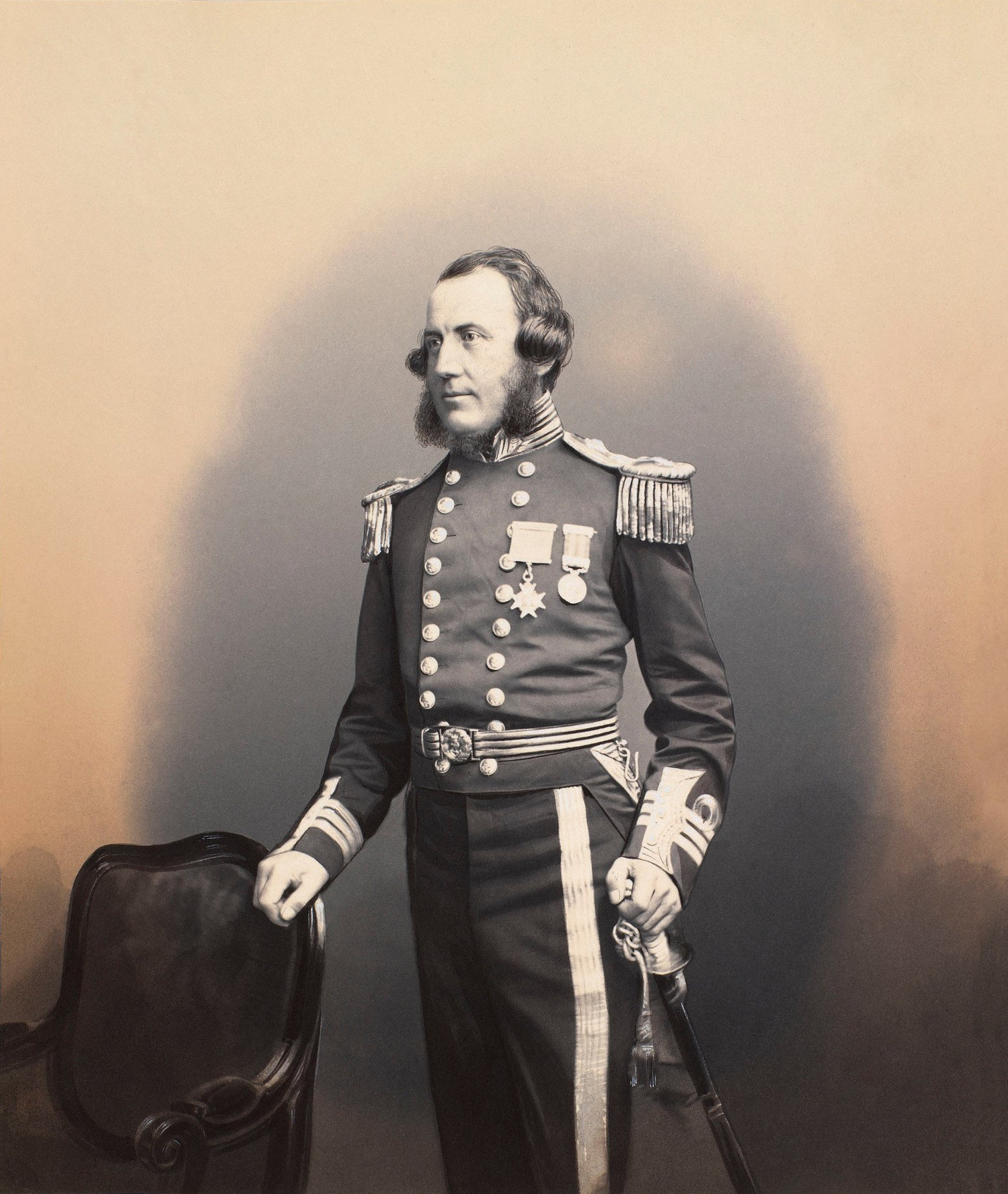
Captain J. W. Tarleton

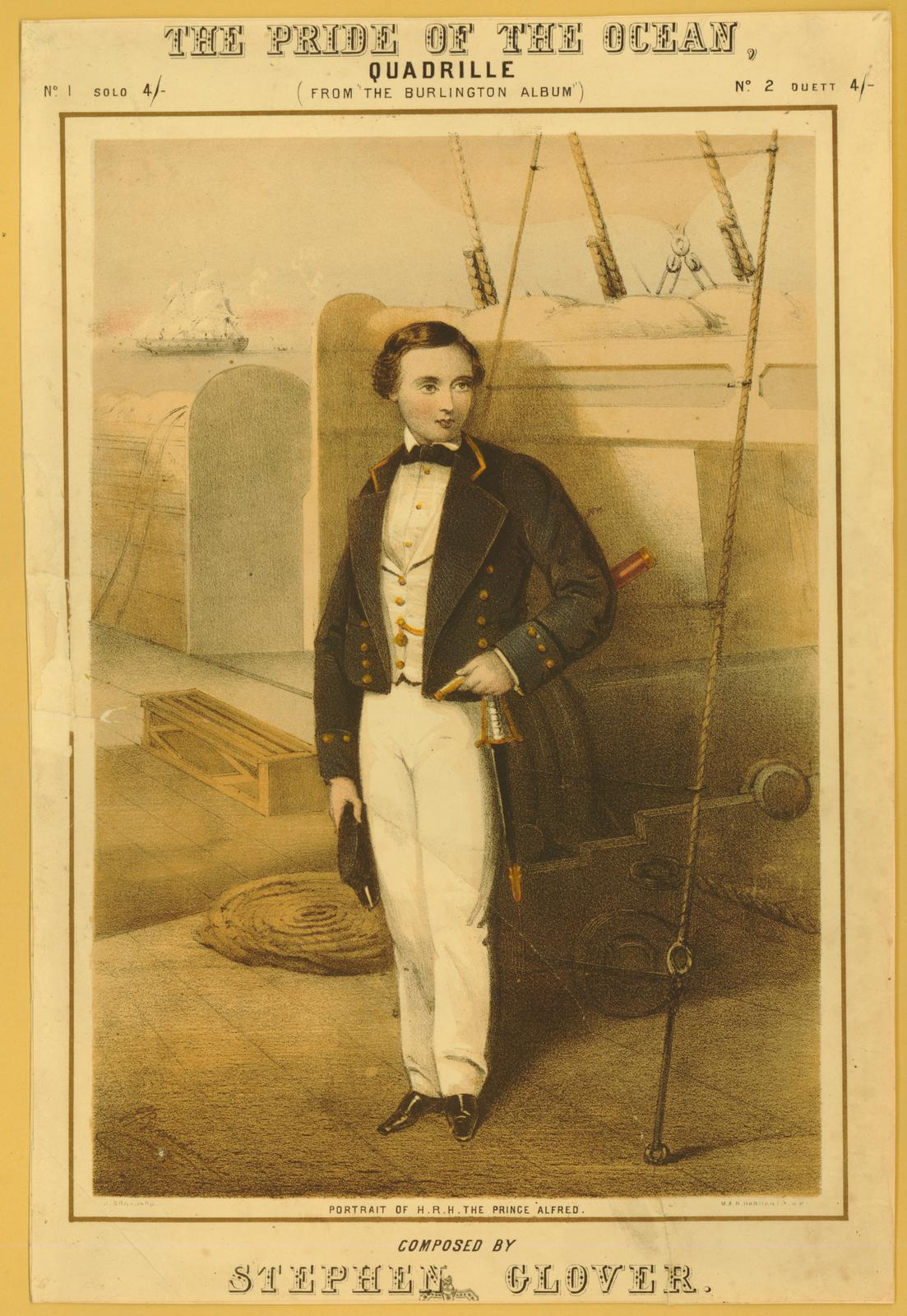
Prince Alfred as a naval cadet

Under the command of J. W. Tarleton, she served in the Mediterranean in 1858. The same year Prince Alfred was appointed to the ship as a naval cadet. In 1860, the ship visited the Cape of Good Hope.

Euryalus arrived at Yokohama on 15 September 1862, the day following the Namamugi Incident, a samurai assault on British nationals on the outskirts of the treaty port that led to a major breakdown in Anglo-Japanese relations. In an effort to enforce reparations from the Satsuma Domain, Euryalus served as Admiral Sir Augustus Kuper's flagship during the bombardment of Kagoshima on 16 August 1863. During the bombardment of Kagoshima the Captain of Euryalus, John James Steven Josling, was killed, as was his second-in-command, Commander Edward Wilmot, both decapitated by the same cannonball. Eight other members of the crew also died in the action, their names all commemorated on a memorial in the former British Consulate building in Yokohama.

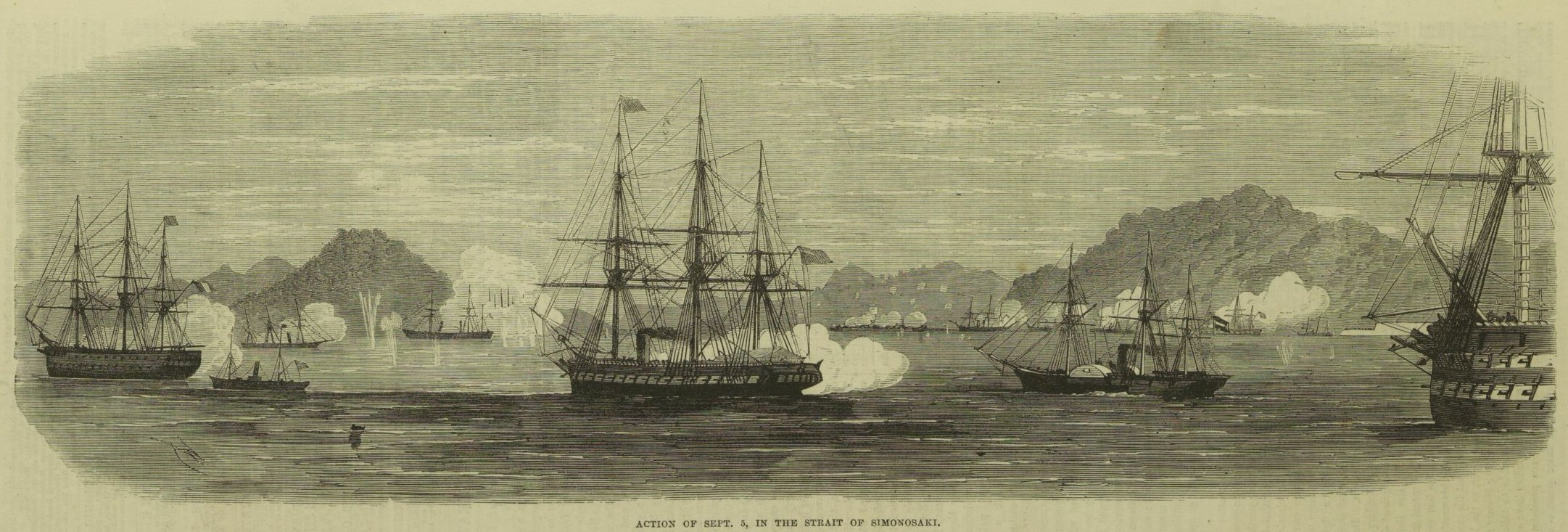
The Euryalus, with Sir A. Kuper's flag (centre), at the bombardment of Shimonoseki, 1864

Euryalus also participated in the bombardment of Shimonoseki in September 1864. The captain and commander of the ship at Shimonoseki was Captain John Hobhouse Inglis Alexander, who was severely wounded in the ankle as he led the assault on the batteries onshore. The Euryalus's Captain of the Afterguard, Thomas Pride, was awarded a Victoria Cross for his actions during one of the stormings at Shimonoseki. It was at Shimonoseki that Duncan Gordon Boyes won his Victoria Cross at the age of 17.

== Fate ==
Euryalus was paid off at Portsmouth on 23 September 1865. She was broken up in 1867.
