= Charles Lennox Richardson =

British merchant (1834–1862) killed in the Namamugi Incident

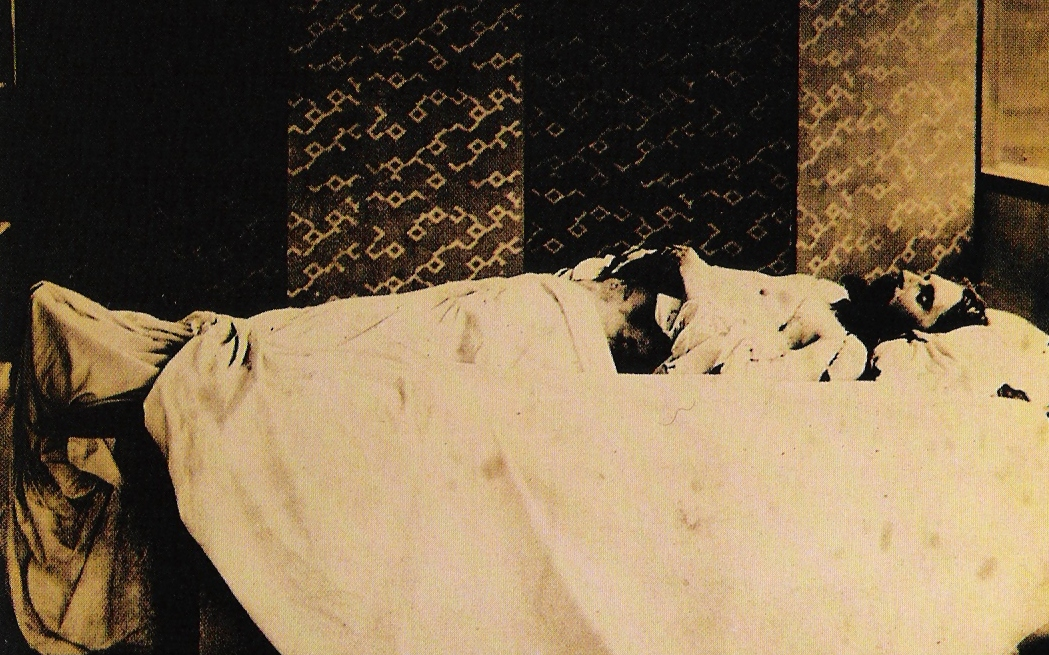
The body of Charles Richardson, 1862

Charles Lennox Richardson (16 April 1833 – 14 September 1862) was a British merchant based in Shanghai, Qing Empire who was killed in Japan during the Namamugi Incident. His middle name is spelled Lenox in the census and family documents.

== Merchant ==
Richardson was born in London in 1833. He relocated to Shanghai in 1853 to seek his fortune in the China trade. In 1862, Richardson announced his retirement, and was en route back to England when he stopped at the treaty port of Yokohama in September 1862.

== Namamugi Incident ==
After Richardson met Woodthorpe Charles Clarke, an old friend from Shanghai, they joined fellow merchant William Marshall, and Marshall's sister-in-law Margaret Watson Borradaile to go on a sightseeing ride via the nearby Kanagawa town towards the temple of Kawasaki Daishi. While travelling on the Tōkaidō road – the Imperial highway – through the village of Namamugi, now part of Tsurumi ward, Yokohama, the party encountered the retinue of Satsuma regent daimyō Shimazu Hisamitsu, also known as Shimazu Saburō, heading in the opposite direction.

When Richardson approached Shimazu's palanquin too closely, the daimyō's bodyguard attacked the Englishman. Marshall and Clarke were also severely wounded in the incident. Grievously wounded, Richardson fell from his horse a short distance from the attack and was killed with a coup de grâce on the orders of Shimazu.

The British government demanded reparations following the Namamugi Incident but when Shimazu refused to pay the reparations, a squadron of Royal Navy ships bombarded Kagoshima during the brief Anglo-Satsuma War the following year.

== Burial ==
Following an autopsy conducted by William Willis, who had joined the British mission in Japan in 1861, Richardson was buried in a private plot near the Yokohama Foreign Cemetery between the later graves of Marshall and Clarke.

== Reception ==
Several accounts exist regarding the cause of the altercation in which Richardson was killed. Louis G. Perez, Professor of Japanese History at Illinois State University, in Japan at War: An Encyclopaedia (2013), presents the following: per one account, Richardson and his party were turning their horses around to yield the road when the Satsuma retainers attacked preemptively to maintain the order of the procession. This arose from "the language barrier and the retainers' anti-foreign zeal". Alternatively, it was claimed, Richardson and his cohort forced his way into the procession and were attacked by the retainers, outraged at the disrespect to their lord. In any case, the incident "reflects the widespread anti-foreign sentiment that had emerged among many Japanese people since the country was forced open in 1854."

John W. Denney, in Respect and Consideration: Britain in Japan 1853-1868 and Beyond (2011), also emphasises the differing accounts, noting that "the incontestable points are that Shimazu Saburō's samurai killed Richardson and severely wounded Marshall and Clarke". The latter two men, at the official inquest, claimed that although they noticed samurai ahead, they did not know they were part of a daimyō's retinue. On turning a corner, they recognised they were "twelve men deep into the procession and close to the daimyō", but as "none of the party had shouted or gesticulated at the Japanese in front of them", they were "confident that no hostile moves would be made by the samurai." On attempting to turn around, a retainer struck Richardson with his sword, then inflicted a less severe wound on Marshall. Travelling at speed to escape the retinue, the men received further wounds.

The accounts of the men and Mrs Borradaile were the only ones given until 1875, when American E. H. House, a campaigning journalist and writer, published a pamphlet giving the Satsuma version of the incident. House stated that Richardson was "notorious for his violent dealings with Chinese people during his residency in Shanghai", and his reputation had preceded him. He also claimed that, on passing Japanese acquaintances, Richardson's party had asked why they had dismounted, this being customary for the passing of the daimyō, but not taken note of the explanation.

In light of the "inexorable regulation" that "no casual passenger should continue to ride, either upon his horse or in any conveyance, during the occupancy of the road by a dignitary of high station", the Satsuma people felt that Richardson and his companions ought to have observed this. No Japanese would have been permitted to ride through the procession. Had Richardson and his companions given no "offence other than that which might have proceeded from ignorance", they would have been unmolested. Richardson "had continued to push his horse in and out of the groups forming the cortége", but had the party advanced in single file, rather than two abreast, "they could have passed uninjured, as others had done before them, and others did after".

In a 2013 article, historian Folker Reichert claimed that according to Japanese reports at the time, he disrespectfully rode in the middle of the road and even tried to get between the regent's litter and his bodyguards. Per Reichert, just before the incident, after Mrs Borradaile, concerned by signs of hostility from the retinue, begged him not to provoke them. Richardson allegedly said, "I have lived for fourteen years in China. I know how to manage these people." Per Denney, this must have been "four years", as fourteen was not possible. Richardson's uncle was reportedly not surprised about his nephew's demise and blamed him for being reckless and stubborn. Frederick Wright-Bruce, the British envoy to China, remembered Richardson as an "arrogant adventurer".

== See also ==
- Namamugi Incident
- Anglo-Satsuma War
- Anglo-Japanese relations
- Sakoku
- List of Westerners who visited Japan before 1868
