= Benjamin Jaurès =

French naval officer and politician

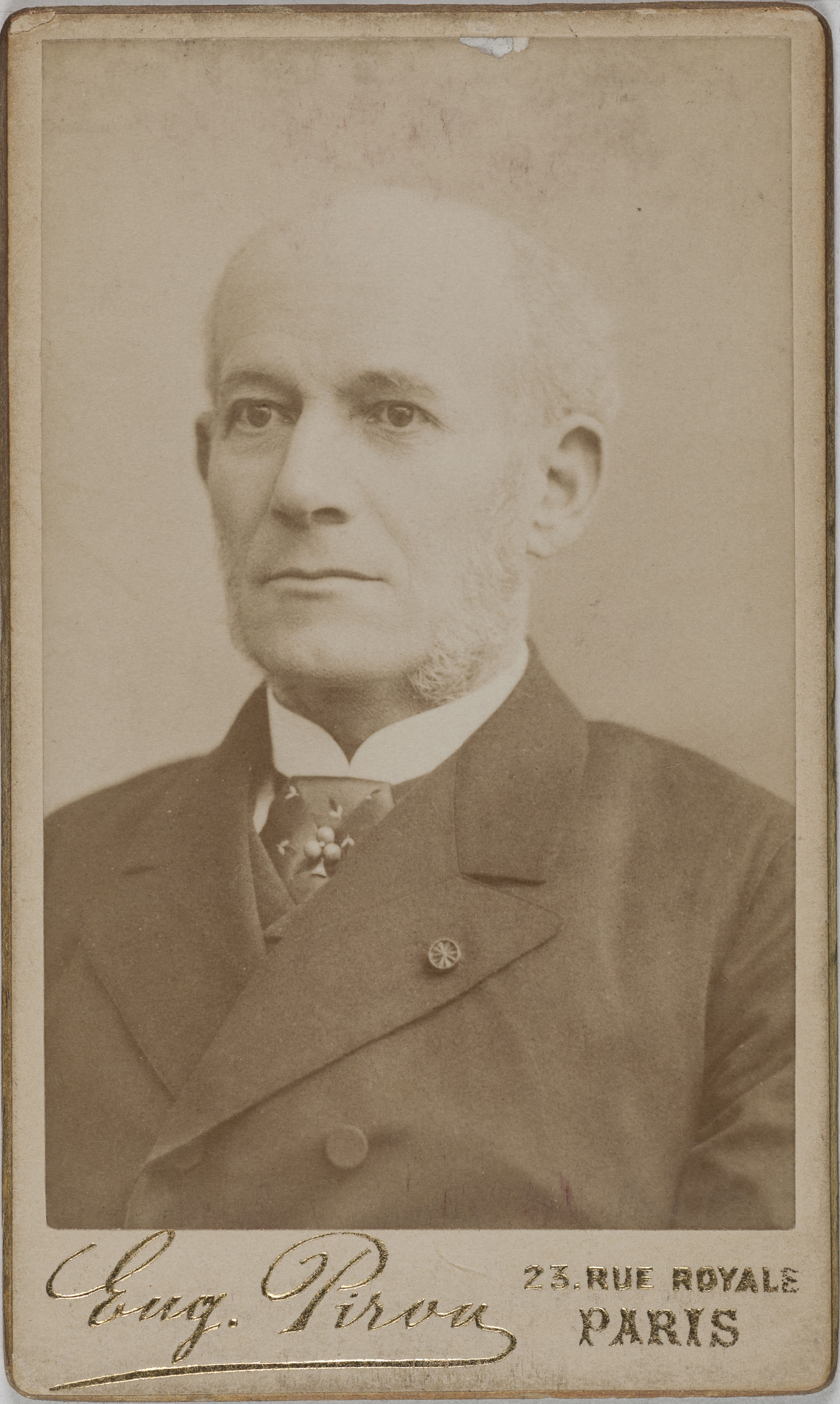
Benjamin Jaurès

Admiral Constant Louis Jean Benjamin Jaurès (3 February 1823 – 13 March 1889) was a French Navy officer and politician. Born in Albi, Tarn, he was a senator for life and active in Japan during the 1863 Shimonoseki campaign and the Boshin War. He became Minister of the Navy and Colonies on 22 February 1889, in the government of Pierre Tirard. The famous French politician, Jean Jaurès, was his nephew.

== See also ==
- List of naval ministers of France
