= Namamugi Incident =

1862 political crisis in Tokugawa Japan

Coordinates: 35°29′29″N 139°39′49″E

The Namamugi Incident depicted in a 19th-century Japanese woodcut print with Charles Lennox Richardson at the centre of the scene.

The Namamugi incident (生麦事件, Namamugi-jiken), also known as the Kanagawa incident and Richardson affair, was a political crisis that occurred in the Tokugawa Shogunate of Japan during the Bakumatsu on 14 September 1862. Charles Lennox Richardson, a British merchant, was killed by the armed retinue of Shimazu Hisamitsu, the regent of the Satsuma Domain, on a road in Namamugi near Kawasaki.

Richardson's killing sparked outrage among Europeans for violating their extraterritoriality in Japan, while the Japanese argued Richardson had disrespected Shimazu and was justifiably killed under the Kiri-sute gomen rule. British demands for compensation and failure by the Satsuma to respond resulted in the Bombardment of Kagoshima (or Anglo-Satsuma War) in August 1863.

== Course of events ==
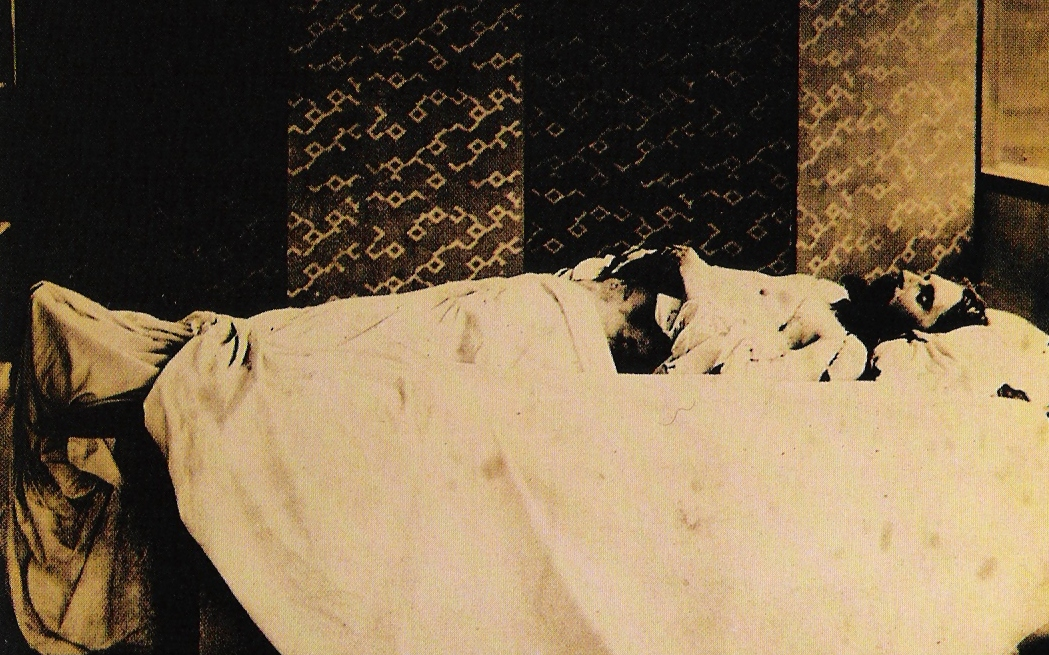
Body of Charles Richardson, 1862.

On 14 September 1862, four British citizens – the Shanghai-based merchant Charles Lennox Richardson, two Yokohama-based merchants, Woodthorpe Charles Clark and William Marshall, and Marshall's sister-in-law Margaret Watson Borradaile – were travelling on the Tōkaidō road in Japan en route to visit the Kawasaki Daishi temple near Kawasaki, though they were warned by officials to not travel along the Tokaido that day as the procession of a lord was going to pass through that day. Richardson had recently announced his retirement, and was visiting the temple with his friends en route back to England. The party had departed the treaty port of Yokohama at 2:30 pm by boat, crossing Yokohama harbour to Kanagawa village, to join their horses which had been sent ahead. They were travelling north through the nearby village of Namamugi (now part of Tsurumi Ward, Yokohama) when they encountered the large, armed retinue of Shimazu Hisamitsu, the regent and father of Shimazu Tadayoshi, the daimyō of the Satsuma Domain.

Shimazu was heading in the opposite direction to Richardson and his party, who continued to ride along the side of the road without dismounting until they reached the main body of the procession, which occupied the entire width of the road. Accounts differ as to the nature of the altercation. Richardson was subsequently slashed and mortally wounded by one of the Satsuma bodyguards. Clark and Marshall were also severely wounded by the Satsuma, and the three rode away as fast as they could. Richardson fell from his horse and Shimazu gave the order for todome – the coup de grâce – to be given, with several samurai proceeding to hack and stab at Richardson with swords and lances. A post-mortem examination of Richardson's body showed ten mortal wounds, and he was buried in the Yokohama Foreign General Cemetery, between the later graves of Marshall and Clark.

== Consequences ==
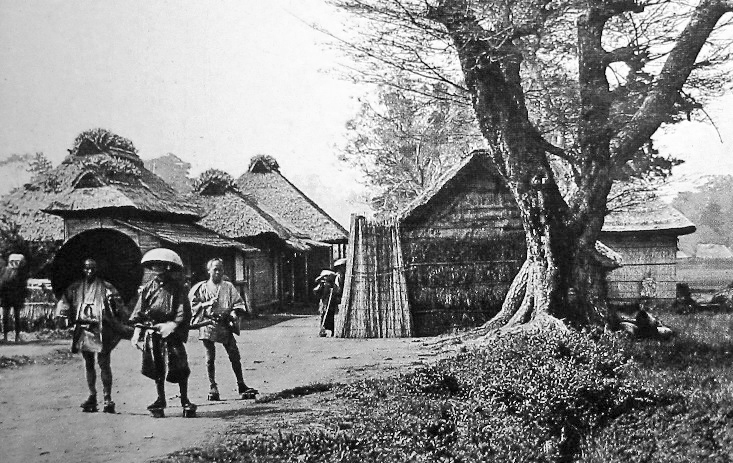
Entrance to the village of Namamugi, circa 1862.

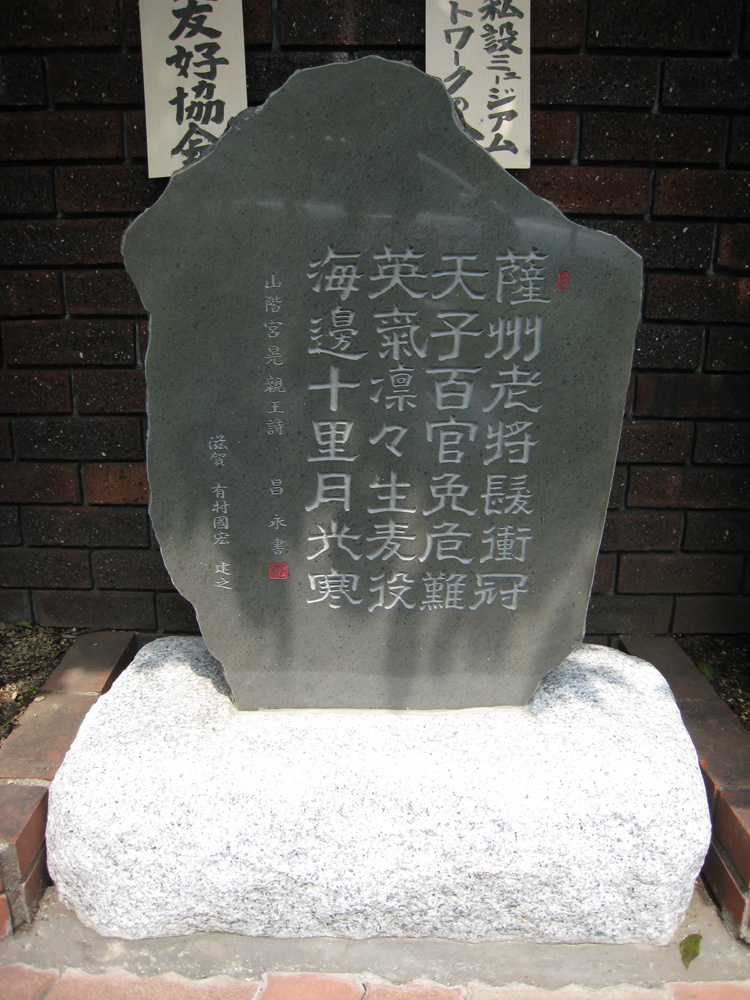
Poetic monument of Namamugi Incident in Yokohama. Inscribed is a Chinese-style poem (kanshi) by Prince Yamashina Akira.

The Namamugi Incident caused a new political crisis in Japan during the Bakumatsu, the period after the ruling Tokugawa Shogunate had ended its historic isolationist foreign policy known as sakoku and allowed the entry of foreigners. Japanese and Westerners were outraged by the incident, with these groups almost unanimously supportive and opposed to the killing, respectively.

Japanese reports accused Richardson of continuing to ride in the middle of the road, and trying to get between Shimazu's litter and his bodyguards. In Japan, the samurai had a legal right known as kiri-sute gomen which allowed them to strike anyone of a lower class for perceived disrespect, which could have justified the killing by Shimazu's retinue. The Japanese instanced Eugene Van Reed, an American who had dismounted and bowed before a daimyō's train, as evidence that the insolent attitude of Lennox and his party had caused the incident. Van Reed's conduct had appalled the Western community, who believed that Westerners should hold themselves with dignity before the Japanese, being at least the equal of any Japanese person. There were also later suggestions that Richardson had acted in a similar manner towards Chinese people while horseback riding in China, and according to the Japan Herald "Extra" of Tuesday 16 September 1862, he had been heard to say just before the incident, "I know how to deal with these people". Richardson's uncle was reportedly not surprised about his nephew's demise, but blamed him for being reckless and stubborn. Frederick Wright-Bruce, the British envoy to China, remembered Richardson as an "arrogant adventurer".

The incident sparked a scare in Japan's foreign community, which was based in the Kannai district of Yokohama. Westerners argued that Lennox was protected in Japan by extraterritoriality under the Anglo-Japanese Friendship Treaty and were exempt from Japanese cultural requirements, meaning Richardson's death under kiri-sute gomen was illegal. Many Western traders appealed to their governments to take punitive action against Japan. The British government demanded reparations from the Bakufu and from the daimyō of Satsuma, together with the arrest, trial and execution of the perpetrators.

=== Bombardment of Kagoshima ===
By mid-1863, the British had become impatient that the reparations demands for the Namamugi Incident were still unmet. In July, the Bakufu reluctantly paid the British the sum of £100,000 (one-third of their annual revenue) in compensation, though this was mainly due to fear of naval bombardment against the Tokugawa capital city of Edo. The Satsuma Domain continued to ignore the British demands and refused to apologize for Richardson's death.

On 15 August, a Royal Navy squadron entered the waters of Kagoshima, the capital city of the Satsuma Domain, to extract the demanded reparations for the Namamugi Incident by force. Meeting further prevarication, they seized several Satsuma ships as bargaining chips for future negotiations, but were unexpectedly fired upon by Satsuma coastal batteries. The squadron retaliated by destroying the Satsuma vessels and bombarding Kagoshima, which had been evacuated. The Satsuma batteries were gradually silenced, but the British ships were unable to sustain the bombardment and retreated two days later. Ultimately, the battle resulted in five killed on the Satsuma side, and eleven lives among the British (including, with a single cannon shot, both the captain and commander of the British flagship HMS Euryalus). (Note: The British casualties were caused by Satsuma gunnery as well as accidents due to the flawed breech-loading guns developed by the English engineer William George Armstrong.)

Satsuma's material losses were substantial, with around 500 houses destroyed in Kagoshima, and three Satsuma steamships were sunk. The engagement caused much controversy in the British House of Commons, but Acting Vice Admiral Augustus Kuper's conduct was eventually commended by the House. Kuper was advanced to Knight Commander of the Most Honourable Order of the Bath in 1864 "for his services at Kagoshima". Shimazu Hisamitsu was subsequently given the court title of Ōsumi no Kami (大隅守).

The military stalemate resulted in a renegotiation between the British and Satsuma regarding the Namamugi Incident. The Satsuma admired the superiority of the Royal Navy and sought a trading relationship with Britain as a result. Later that year, the Satsuma paid the £25,000 (equivalent to £2,700,000 in 2025) in compensation demanded by the British government with money borrowed from the Bakufu. The Satsuma never repaid the £25,000 to the Bakufu because the Tokugawa Shogunate would be overthrown in the Meiji Restoration five years later, and British demands for the Shimazu's bodyguards that had killed Richardson to be brought to trial were unfulfilled. The Bombardment of Kagoshima became known in Japan as the Anglo-Satsuma War (薩英戦争, Satsu-Ei Sensō).

== See also ==
- Japan–United Kingdom relations
- Bombardment of Kagoshima
