= Foreign cemeteries in Japan =

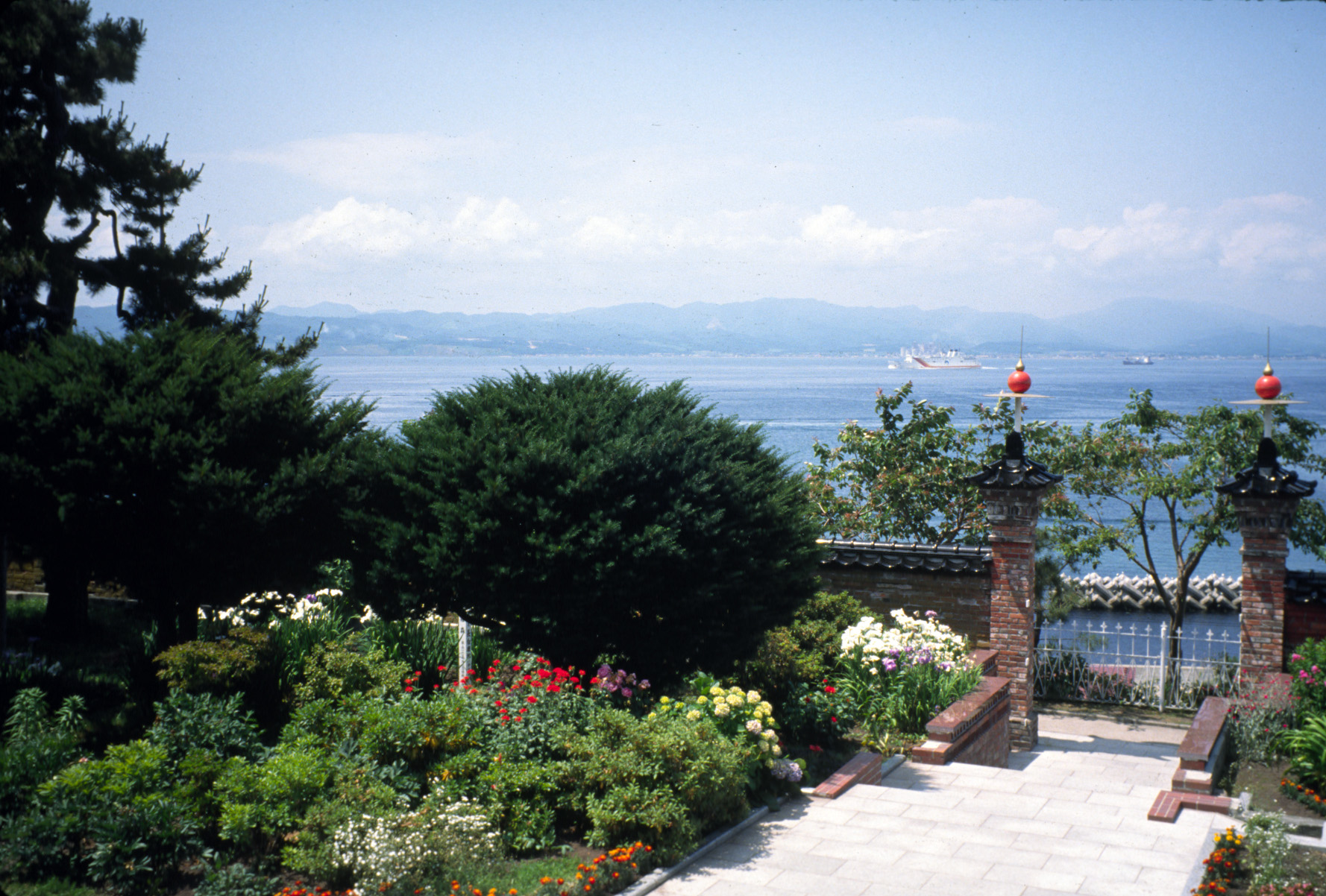
Foreigners' cemetery in Hakodate

The foreign cemeteries in Japan (外国人墓地, gaikokujin bochi; "foreigner cemetery") are chiefly located in Tokyo and at the former treaty ports of Kobe, Hakodate, Nagasaki, and Yokohama. Foreigners who died in Japan are buried there.

== Hakodate ==
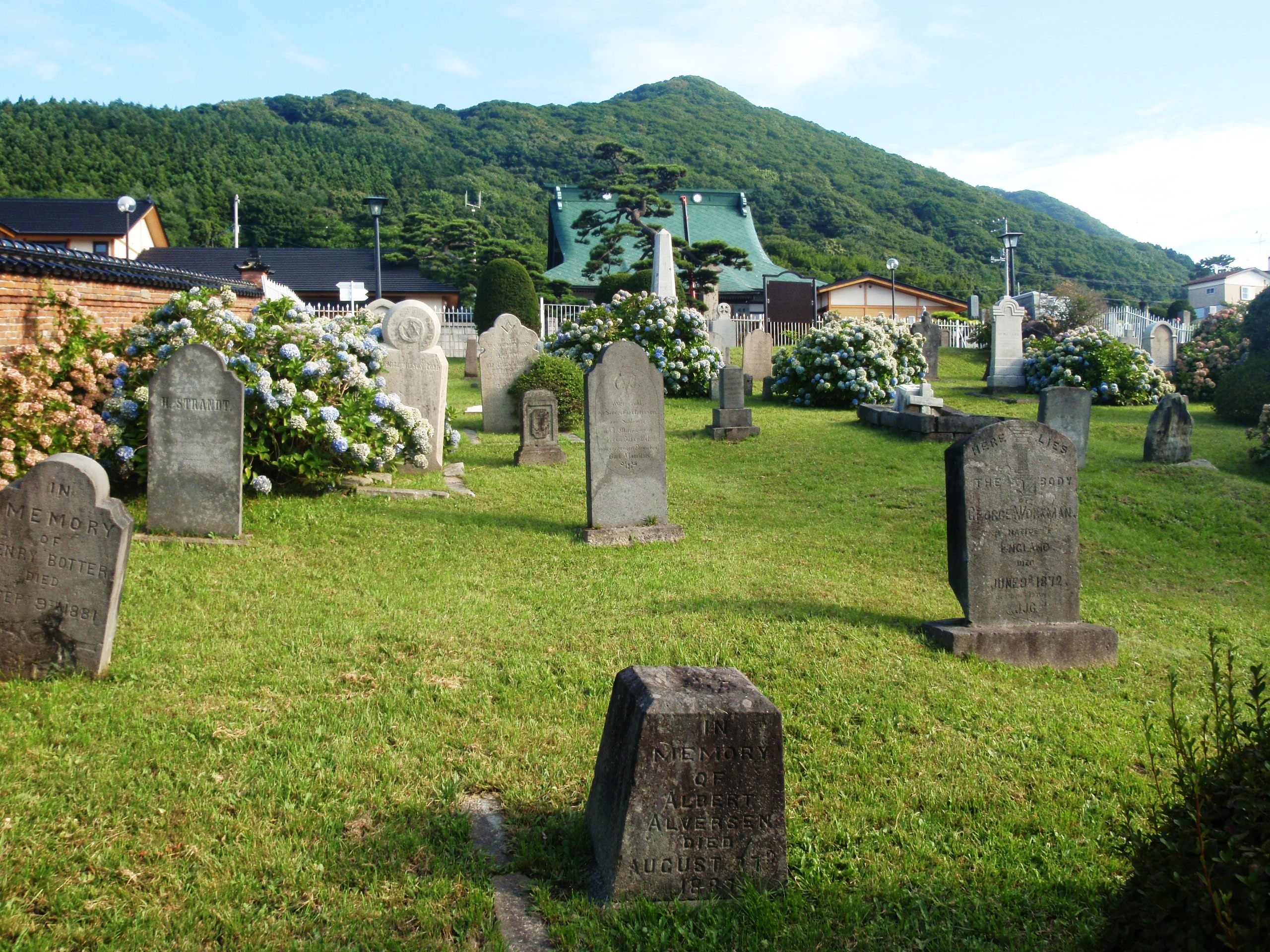
Hakodate Foreign Cemetery

The Hakodate Foreign Cemetery, located in the Motomachi district, is just below Mt. Hakodate and over the coastal beach. The cemetery is divided into national and cultural sections; different local associations are responsible for the maintenance of each section. All graves face the ocean. They include the graves of two mariners from the fleet of Commodore Matthew Calbraith Perry.

== Kobe ==
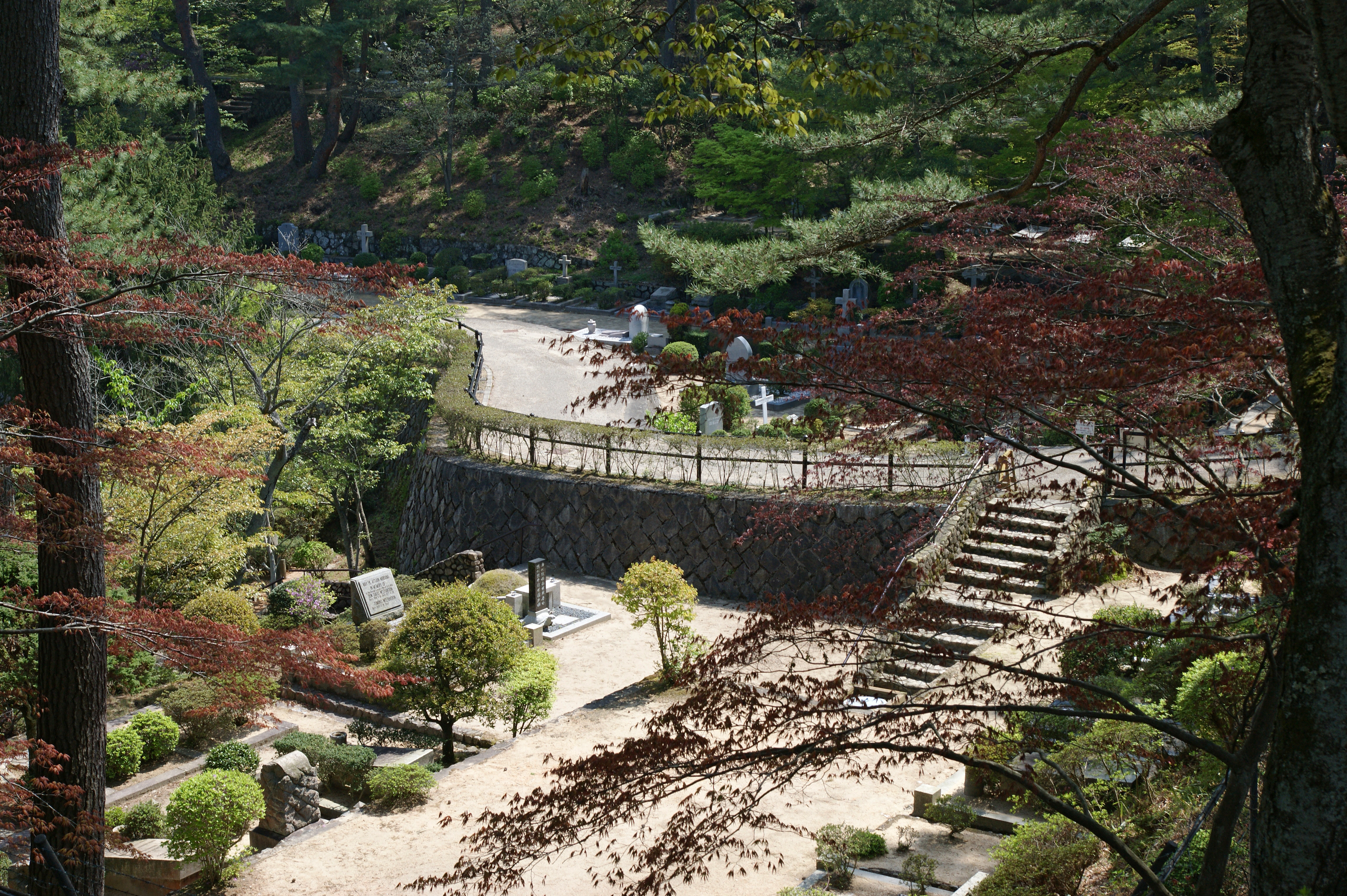
Kobe Municipal Foreign Cemetery

Kobe originally had two foreign cemeteries. One, Onohama, located in the foreign settlement, the other located in Kasugano.

In the early 1950s, the Kobe City Government began relocating all foreigners' graves to a new Foreigners' Cemetery, the Kobe Municipal Foreign Cemetery (神戸市立外国人墓地), in Futatabi Park in the hills high above the city. This was completed in 1962.

Mount Futatabi, in a woodland location, has the graves of many long-term residents, including Alexander Cameron Sim. James Joseph Enslie a long serving British Consular Officer in Kobe has a large grave in the cemetery.

George French, the Chief Justice of the British Supreme Court for China and Japan was buried in Onohama in 1881.

== Nagasaki ==
Nagasaki has three main international cemeteries: 1) Inasa International Cemetery, which is the oldest foreign cemetery in Japan and consists of separate plots for Chinese, Dutch and Russian people; 2) Oura International Cemetery, which was established in the early 1860s near the site of the Nagasaki foreign settlement and served the foreign community until being closed in 1888; and 3) Sakamoto International Cemetery, which has some 440 graves including that of Scottish merchant Thomas Blake Glover.

== Naha ==
There is a foreign cemetery in Naha, Okinawa. The earliest graves are of Chinese sailors. Several contemporaries of Matthew C. Perry are buried there.

== Shimoda ==
Four members of American Commodore Matthew Perry's flotilla are buried in the cemetery of the small Buddhist temple of Gyokusen-ji that served as the first America consulate in Japan. Another American and three Russians were also buried there in the 1850s.

== Tokyo ==
The Tokyo foreign cemetery is a section of the Aoyama Cemetery in Aoyama, Tokyo. By 2005 it was under threat from the city's bureaucracy, which threatened to remove graves for which fees had not been paid by families of the deceased. The Foreign Section Trust was formed to campaign to preserve the foreign part of the cemetery. Eventually the situation was rectified and the foreign section is now a protected monument, commemorating the men and women who helped build Japan in the late 19th century.

These are the graves of expatriates from the Meiji era, men and women who promoted Western ideas and practices in Japan—doctors, educators, missionaries, and artists. Many of them were o-yatoi gaikokujin.

Famous non-Japanese buried there include the British minister plenipotentiary Hugh Fraser who died in the post in 1894, Captain Francis Brinkley, Guido Verbeck, Henry Spencer Palmer, Edoardo Chiossone, Joseph Heco, Edwin Dun, Mary True, and several others.

== Yokohama ==
=== Yokohama Foreign General Cemetery ===
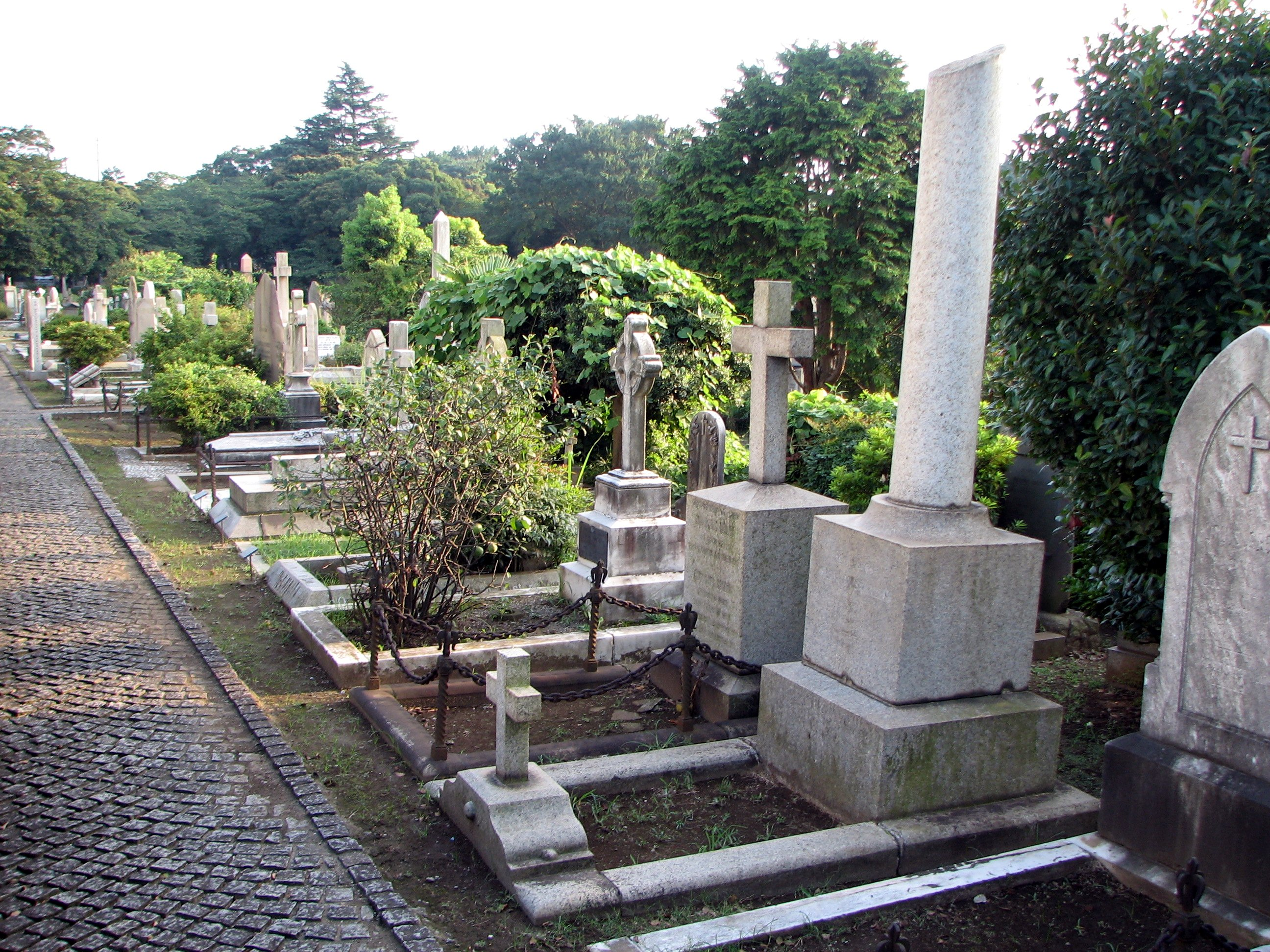
The Yokohama Foreign General Cemetery

The Yokohama Foreign General Cemetery, located in Yamate Naka-ku, Yokohama, includes among many others the grave of Charles Lennox Richardson, murdered in the Namamugi Incident in September 1862, John Wilson, and those of Charles Wirgman, Ludovicus Stornebrink, and John Carey Hall. The French military advisors of the Boshin War, François Bouffier, Jean Marlin, and Auguste Pradier are also buried there.

It was first used as a burial ground for non-native Japanese in February 1854, when American Marine, Private Robert Williams was interred after a short Christian burial service conducted by Rev. George Jones. The cemetery was formally dedicated by Bishop Charles Alford on Advent Sunday, 29 November 1868.

The current cemetery consists of 22 sections in an area of 18,500 square meters. In 1864, a memorandum for the foreign settlement at Yokohama was signed by the Tokugawa shogunate with the legations of the main trading nations permitting the extension of the cemetery area to the top of the Bluff opposite the Anglican Christ Church.

On the weekends of the spring, summer and fall (from noon to 4:00 p.m.), the cemetery is open to the public for a small donation to help with the upkeep of the premises. Visitors receive a small pamphlet with a guide to graves of interest, and they can also view a museum at the site. These events are organized by the Yokohama Foreign General Cemetery Foundation which is responsible for the upkeep and general maintenance of the cemetery.

=== Negishi Foreign Cemetery ===
There is another section near Yamate Station on the Keihin-Tōhoku Line, called "Negishi Foreign Cemetery". It was established in 1880, but first used in 1902. Many of the 1923 Great Kantō earthquake victims were buried there.

=== Yokohama War Cemetery ===
Hodogaya-ku, Yokohama is also home to the Yokohama War Cemetery, the only military cemetery in Japan administered by the Commonwealth War Graves Commission. The cemetery contains the graves of 1,555 service personnel from the Second World War who died in conflict, prisoners of war and service personnel from the post-war occupation period. The war graves themselves are split up according to nationality with sections for British, Australia/New Zealand as well as Indian graves.

== See also ==
- o-yatoi gaikokujin
- Heads of the United Kingdom Mission in Japan
- Anglo-Japanese relations
- Franco-Japanese relations
- Japanese cemeteries and cenotaphs in overseas
