= The Barbarian and the Geisha =

1958 film

- Theatrical release half-sheet display poster
- Directed by: John Huston
- Screenplay by: Charles Grayson
- Story by: Ellis St. Joseph
- Produced by: Eugene Frenke
- Starring: John Wayne; Eiko Ando; Sam Jaffe; So Yamamura
- Cinematography: Charles G. Clarke
- Edited by: Stuart Gilmore
- Music by: Hugo W. Friedhofer
- Color process: Color by DeLuxe
- Production company: 20th Century Fox
- Distributed by: 20th Century Fox
- Release date: September 30, 1958
- Running time: 105 minutes
- Country: United States
- Language: English
- Budget: $3,495,000
- Box office: $2.5 million

The Barbarian and the Geisha (working titles The Townsend Harris Story and The Barbarian) is a 1958 American adventure film directed by John Huston and starring John Wayne. The film was shot primarily on location in Japan.

Townsend Harris is appointed the first Consul General to Japan. Upon his arrival, Harris discovers that the Japanese thoroughly mistrust all foreigners, despite a two-year-old treaty between Japan and the United States. Harris slowly earns the respect of the local governor and trust of the local townsfolk and is eventually granted an audience with Japan's military dictator, the Shōgun.

== Plot ==
In 1856, Townsend Harris is sent by President Franklin Pierce to serve as the first U.S. Consul General to Japan, following the treaty written by Commodore Matthew C. Perry two years before. Accompanied only by his translator-secretary, Henry Heusken and three Chinese servants, Harris comes ashore at the town of Shimoda prefecture, as specified in the treaty as the location for an American consulate.

However, the Japanese governor Tamura refuses to accept his credentials, denying him any official status, due to a conflict between interpretations of the treaty terms. While Harris believes that the Consul shall be present whenever either country requires, the Japanese believe the terms to permit a consul only when both countries require. The governor holds to his interpretation, largely because of objections over the threats under which the treaty was forced upon them. Harris is permitted to remain in Shimoda, but only as a private citizen, with no recognition of his official status. He is provided the use of an abandoned home, adjacent to the town cemetery.

Tamura explains that, in the two years following Perry's visit, various natural disasters had taken place. Some Japanese believed them to be warnings from the gods to avoid foreign influences. In the weeks that follow, Harris is the target of distrust and hostility, to the extent that Tamura orders townspeople to not even sell him food. Some in Japan wanted the country opened, but many others feared the corruption of foreign influences, and invasion by the barbarians of other lands. For this reason, Harris is not permitted to leave Shimoda, nor to go any closer to the capitol in Edo, 100 miles away.

For his own part, Harris does his best to cooperate with Tamura, even obeying orders to take down the American flag which had been raised to mark the location of the consulate. His cooperation noted, after several months, Harris is eventually invited to dine with the Governor, a dinner following which Tamura sends a geisha named Okichi to take care of Harris' needs.

The relationship between Harris and Okichi grows closer and more intimate, and she helps him understand Japanese culture. Harris helps rid the village of a cholera epidemic and out of this comes Harris' opportunity to go to Edo, where he must then convince the Shogunate to open the country, while facing his greatest crisis.

== Cast ==
- John Wayne as Townsend Harris
- Eiko Ando as Okichi
- Sam Jaffe as Henry Heusken
- Sō Yamamura as Governor Tamura

== Production ==
Director Anthony Mann initially owned the story but he sold the rights to 20th Century Fox after being unable to sign a big star to play the lead.

Exteriors were shot on location in Japan at Kyoto and the Tōdai-ji shrine in Nara. Interiors and additional scenes were completed at Toho Studios in Tokyo and 20th Century Fox Studios, Los Angeles. During filming, John Wayne and director John Huston did not get along; in one altercation, Wayne throttled and punched Huston on set.

The film was heavily re-edited by 20th Century Fox before release. Huston denounced this version and even wanted to have his name removed from the credits. Huston had wanted to make a particularly Japanese film in terms of photography, pacing, color and narration but according to him only a few edits – representing his vision – were left intact in the theatrical version.

== Reception ==
The film performed disappointingly at the box office. Despite Huston's anger at studio interference, The New York Times' Bosley Crowther liked the film's cinematography calling it a "whole picture out of patience and pageantry". Blu-ray.com's Casey Broadwater observed this about the film: "Wayne's restrained and uncomfortable "other-ness" as a gaijin in Japan is essential to the story. With his cowboy swagger and deep commanding drawl, Wayne typifies every Japanese stereotype about brash, take-charge Americans, and Barbarian's specific frisson comes from seeing his character stumped and stymied by a culture that values group-think over individualism".

== Historical accuracy ==
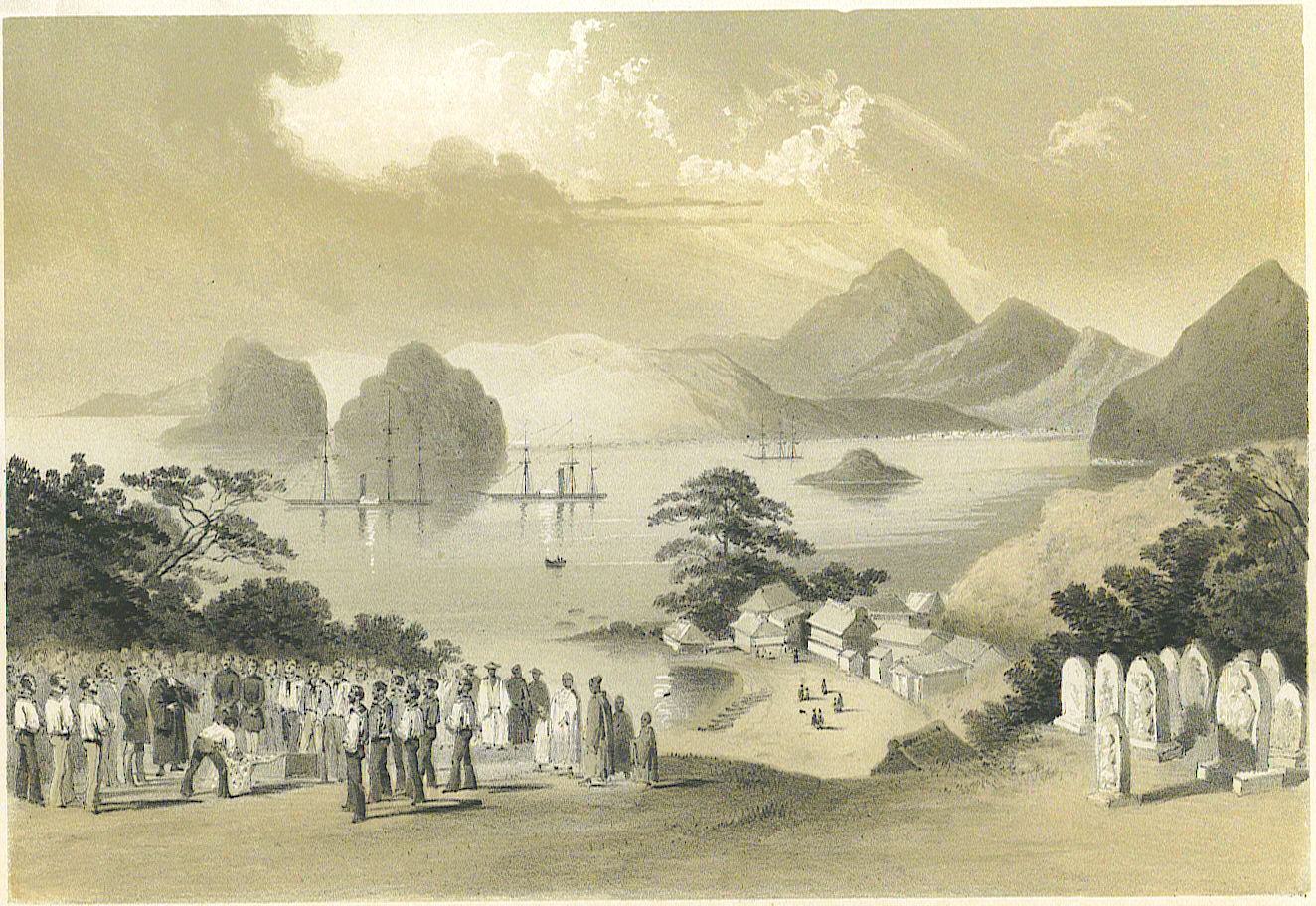
Lithograph of "Shimoda as seen from the American Grave Yard" looking towards the harbor – artist, Wilhelm Heine (1856).

The film is a fictionalized account of American diplomat Townsend Harris's time in Japan during the final years of the Tokugawa shogunate. Harris was named the first Consul General to the Empire of Japan by President Franklin Pierce in July 1856. His primary role being to consolidate the first trade agreement between the U.S. and Japan that had been ratified by Commodore Matthew C. Perry in 1853.

After arriving in the country, Harris established the USA's first Consulate at Gyokusen-ji, a temple in the city of Shimoda, in Suruga Province (now part of Shizuoka Prefecture). The location was chosen because it was near to Honshu's main imperial highway (Tōkaidō) and the province was under the direct control of the Tokugawa shogunate. In the five years Harris lived in Japan, the country was in the final years of its international isolation period and Japanese society was strictly controlled by customs and regulations. Seven years after Harris had left Japan in 1861, the Meiji Restoration started in 1868 which saw the demise of the Tokugawa shogunate and victory for Imperial forces in the Boshin War. This triggered Japan's emergence as a modernized nation in the early twentieth century through massive, rapid industrialization, and enormous reforms to its political and social structures.

The film's portrayal of Harris' time in Japan is entirely fictitious by combining actual historical figures with invented characters, situations and chronology. The romantic relationship between Wayne's character and Okichi is also a fabrication.

The film incorporates the enduring Japanese legend about Harris and a 17-year-old geisha named Okichi (お吉). The story says she was pressured by Japanese authorities into forming a relationship with Harris in order to make the trade meetings go more smoothly. However, after Harris departed Japan to return to America, she was insultingly called the "Barbarian Okichi" and was ostracized by her people; as a result, she began drinking and eventually committed suicide in 1892. According to historians, however, most of the story is simply untrue.

Although Okichi was a real person, she was merely one of Harris' housekeepers, and he apparently fired her after only three days of working for him.

== Home media ==
The Barbarian and the Geisha was released as a combo Blu-ray and DVD two disc set on May 8, 2012, by 20th Century Fox Home Entertainment.

== See also ==
- John Wayne filmography
- Tōjin Okichi, a 1954 Japanese film based on the same facts

== Bibliography ==
- Cosenza, Mario Emilio. (1930). The Complete Journal of Townsend Harris First American Consul General and Minister to Japan. New York: Doubleday. ISBN B00085QAZQ [reprinted by Kessinger Publishing Company, Whitefish, Montana, 2007. ISBN 978-1-4325-7244-0]
- Dulles, Foster Rhea, "Yankees and Samurai: America’s Role in the Emergence of Modern Japan, 1791–1900", Harper & Row, New York, 1965.
- Griffis, William Elliot. (1895) Townsend Harris, First American Envoy in Japan. New York: Houghton, Mifflin and Company. ...Click digitized, full-text copy of this book
- Perrin, Noel (1979). Giving up the gun. Boston: David R. Godine. ISBN 0-87923-773-2.
- Provencher, Ken (Spring 2014). "Bizarre Beauty: 1950s Runaway Production in Japan". The Velvet Light Trap. 73 (73). Austin, Texas: University of Texas Press: 39–50. doi:10.7560/VLT7304. ISSN 1542-4251. S2CID 142842143.
