= Henry Heusken =

Dutch-American interpreter for first US consul to Japan (1832 – 1861)

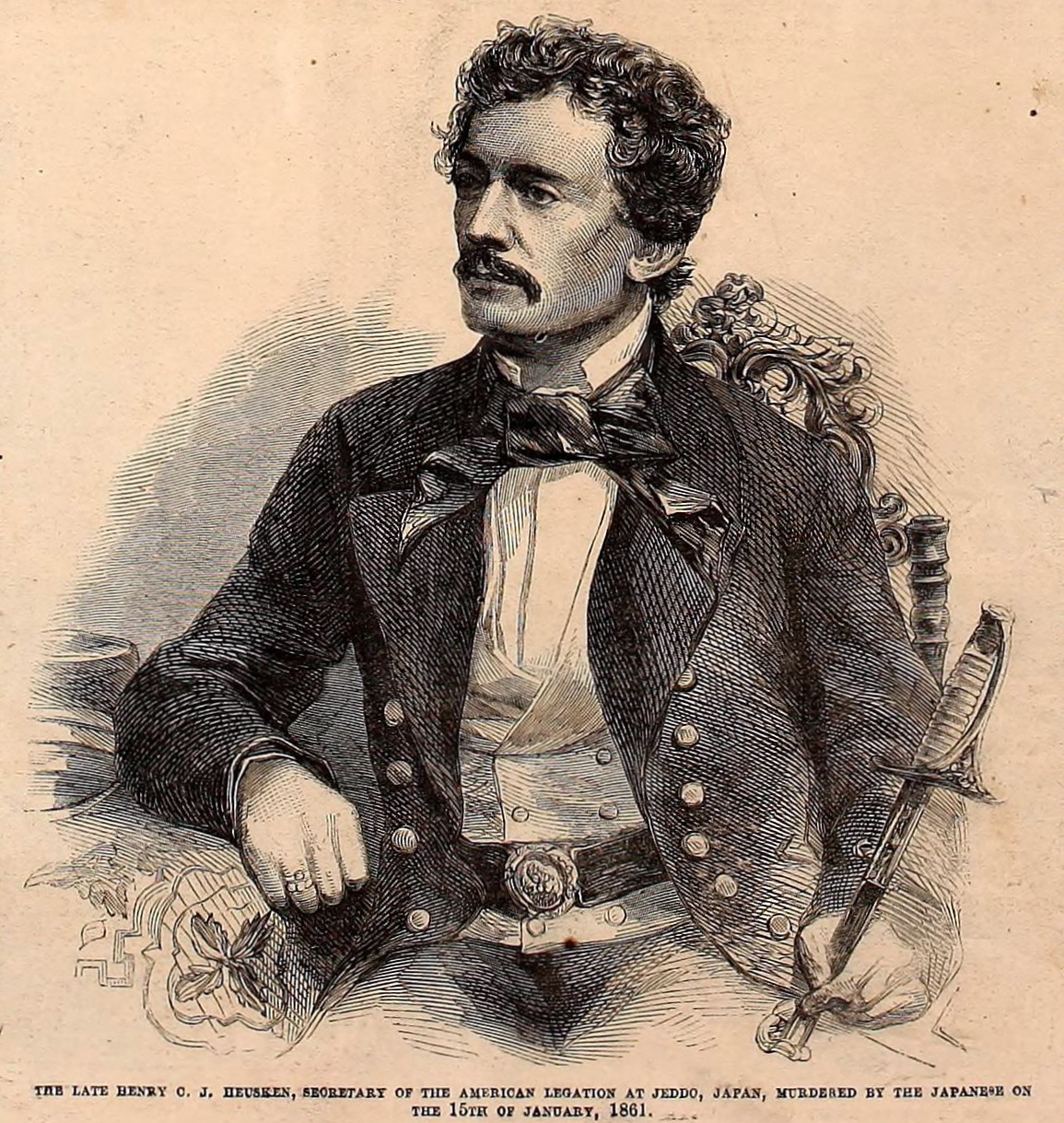
- Memorial portrait of Heusken from Frank Leslie's Illustrated Newspaper
- Born: Hendrick Conrad Joannes Heusken; January 20, 1832; Amsterdam, Netherlands
- Died: January 16, 1861 (aged 28); Edo, Japan
- Occupation: Interpreter
- Years active: 1855-1861
- Notable work: Japan Journal, 1855-1861

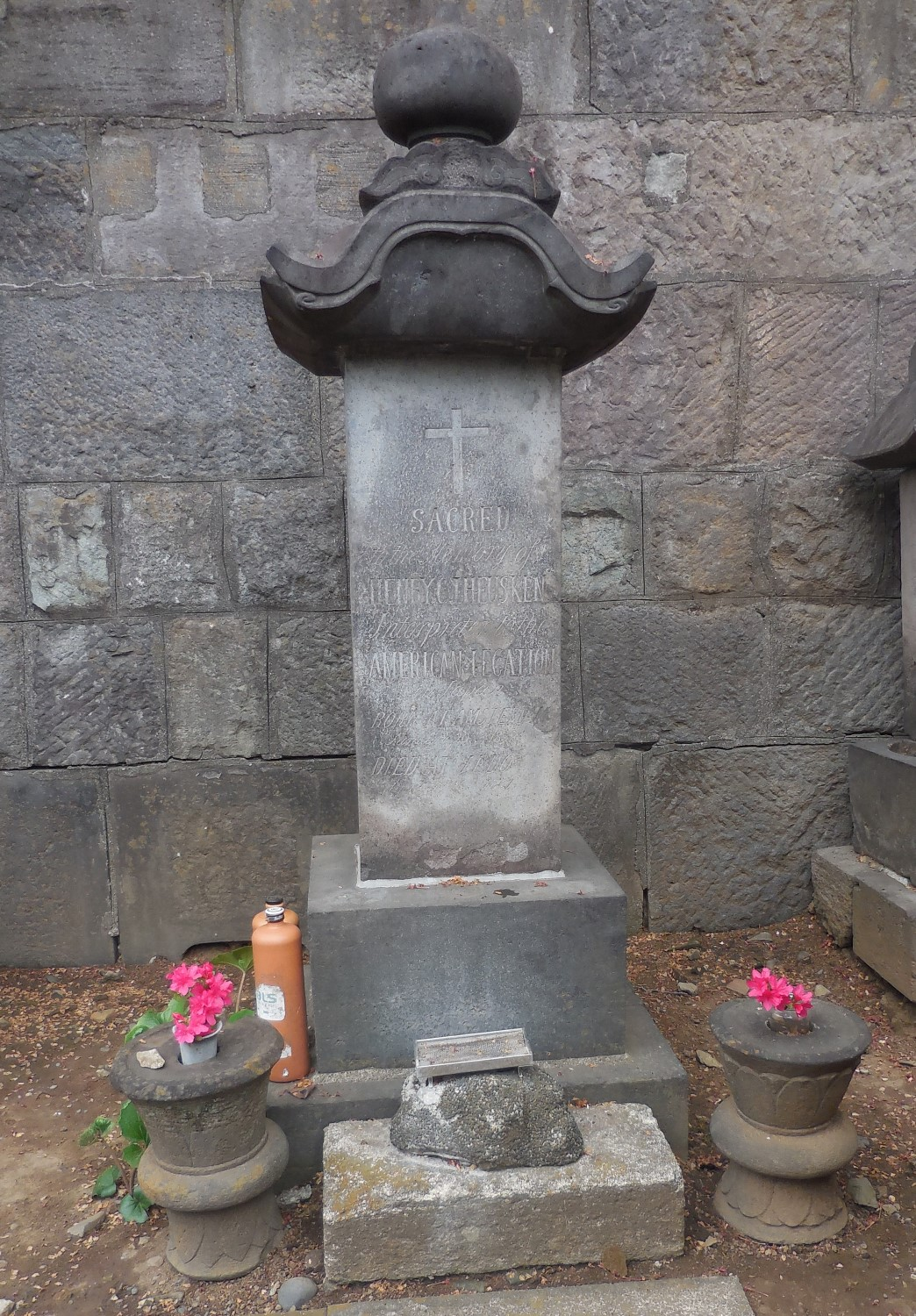
Grave of Heusken at Korin-ji in Tokyo

Hendrick Conrad Joannes Heusken (January 20, 1832 – January 16, 1861) was a Dutch-American interpreter for the first American consulate in Japan, established at Gyokusen-ji in Shimoda, Shizuoka in the late Bakumatsu period. He played an important role in the negotiations for the "Harris Treaty", which opened commercial relations between Japan and the United States, and his assassination caused a minor diplomatic crisis between Japan and the various Western powers.

== Early life ==
Heusken was born in Amsterdam to Joannes Franciscus Heusken, a merchant, and T. F. Smit. Heusken was their only child, he was sent to a boarding school in Brabant until age 15 and planned to go into business under his father's guidance thereafter. However, Joannes soon died, leaving the family business in disarray. Seeking an alternate path to success, and enamored with travel, Heusken emigrated to the United States in 1853.

Arriving in New York City, Hendrick changed his name to Henry, and eventually became a naturalized citizen. But his life in America was difficult as well, and he was sometimes unable to even afford meals as he moved from job to job based on his contacts with the local Dutch community. In 1855, these contacts alerted him to the fact that Townsend Harris, who had been appointed the first United States Consul-General to Japan, was looking for a personal secretary and interpreter in the only European language the Japanese were familiar with.

== In Japan ==
Heusken was quickly hired, and he departed New York in October 1855 on the USS San Jacinto (1850). After a stop in the Kingdom of Siam to successfully negotiate a treaty of commerce based on the recent British Bowring Treaty, Heusken and Harris arrived at Shimoda in August 1856. The two were the only resident Westerners in the town, and they lived in intense isolation, with the local citizens exhorted to avoid them. They were subject to constant police escort, from which they freed themselves only after making repeated objections. The first delivery of correspondence and news from home arrived via Hakodate only after a full year had elapsed, prompting Heusken to bemoan his state as a "poor ignoramus, who hardly knows whether the world still exists".

Negotiations began with the local governors of Shimoda, as Heusken worked closely with Harris, being required to translate every document exchanged and interpret at every meeting. Harris insisted on traveling to the capital city of Edo to present his consular commission and deliver a letter from President Franklin Pierce to the Shogun personally. This was strenuously objected to, resulting in over 20 conferences, of 3 to 5 hours each, at which Heusken had to interpret concerning that topic alone. Finally, permission was granted, and on December 7, 1857, Heusken was present at the first meeting between an official diplomatic representative of the United States and the ruler of Japan.

Difficult, prolonged negotiations continued in both Shimoda and Edo, eventually resulting in Japan's signing of the Treaty of Amity and Commerce on July 29, 1858. Immediately afterwards, Harris lent Heusken's services as interpreter to the recently arrived British minister Lord Elgin, who wished to enact a similar agreement. With the path now greatly eased due to precedent, the Anglo-Japanese treaty was negotiated quickly and signed on August 26. Lord Elgin was grateful for the assistance, writing to Harris: "I have found Mr. Heusken not only well qualified as an Interpreter, but in all other matters which I have had to refer to him, both intelligent and obliging in the highest degree".

In January 1859, the American consulate was elevated to a legation and relocated to Zenpuku-ji in Edo. Heusken quickly became one of the most publicly visible foreigners among the multiple western delegations now present in the city. He frequently rode the streets on horseback, a privilege that was traditionally reserved for the samurai caste. This offense to the sensibilities of some anti-Western locals resulted in multiple outbreaks of violence involving Heusken, including an attempted stoning by a mob while riding with the Dutch Consul Dirk de Graeff van Polsbroek.

Harris wrote to Washington in his official reports that Heusken was kind and amiable in temper, never showing violence to the Japanese, and a universal favorite. However, in his personal diary, he complained that Heusken was lackadaisical, stating "I believe that Mr. Heusken only remembers when to eat, drink and sleep,—any other affairs rest very lightly on his memory". Harris, 28 years Heusken's senior, also criticized his cavalier attitude towards safety, going about unarmed and at night.

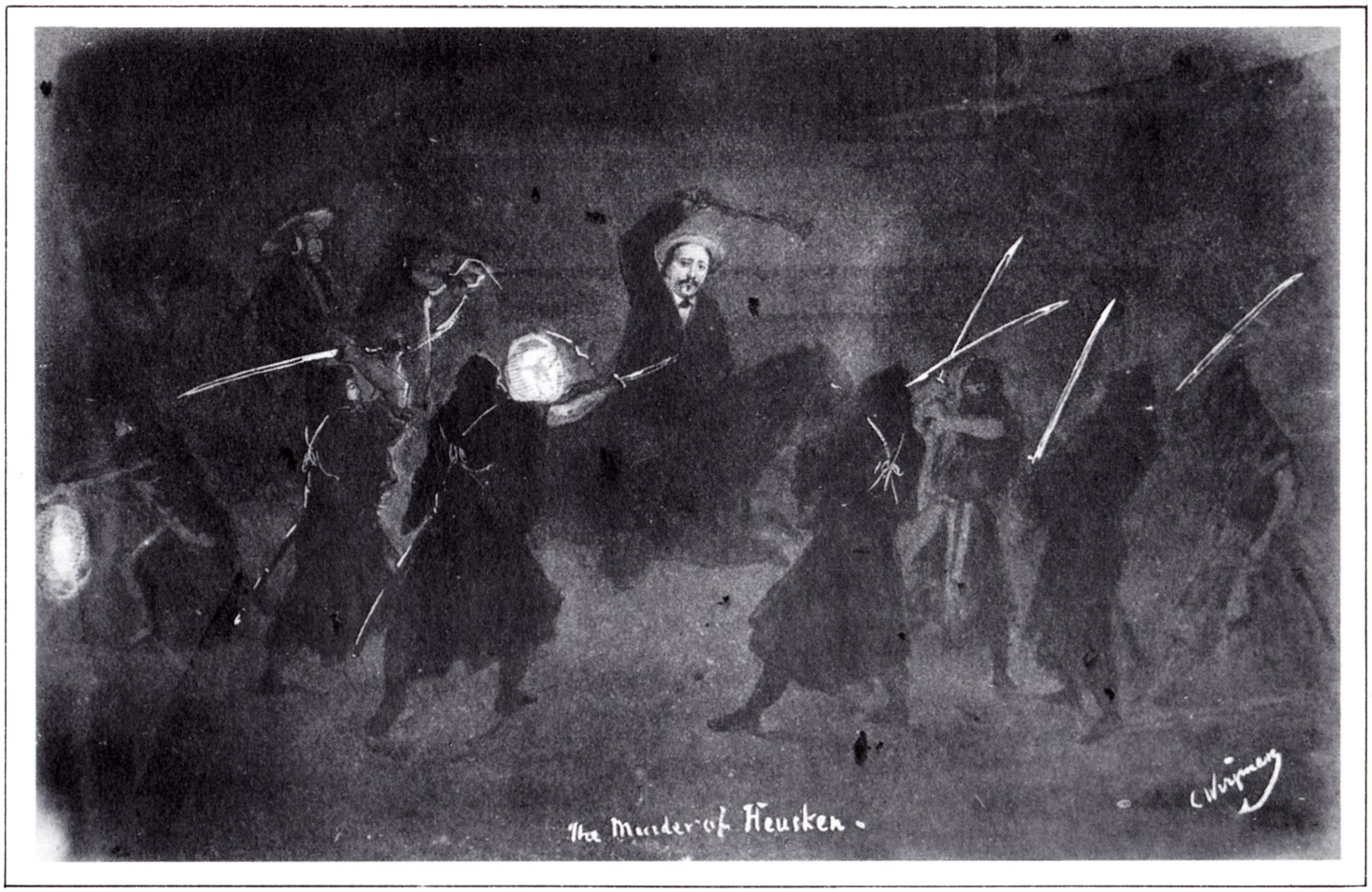
"The murder of Heusken", illustrated by Charles Wirgman

Count Friedrich Albrecht zu Eulenburg, head of the Eulenburg Expedition which was in Japan for the purpose of negotiating a commercial treaty between Prussia and Japan similar to treaties secured by the other European powers, requested that Harris loan Heusken to serve as interpreter during their negotiations. Heusken obliged and proved to be indispensable to the Prussian Legation, as once again he interpreted at all meetings and all documents passed through his hands. For several months, having become friends with many of the Prussians, Heusken fell into a consistent habit of dining and visiting with them almost nightly, not returning home until after 8 o'clock.

After having dinner with Count Eulenburg on the night of January 15, 1861, Heusken was returning to his quarters at Zenpuku-ji accompanied by three mounted officers and four footmen bearing lanterns. The party was suddenly ambushed by seven shishi from Satsuma Domain, including Shōuhei Imuta. Despite his escort, Heusken suffered mortal wounds to both sides of his body in the fight. He mounted a horse and galloped about 200 yards to the American Legation, where he was taken inside and treated by surgeons summoned from the English and Prussian Legations. Despite their best efforts, shortly after midnight on January 16, he succumbed to his wounds.

== Legacy ==
Since he was a Dutch citizen despite his employment at the US Consulate, the Dutch Consul de Graeff van Polsbroek traveled from Kanagawa to arrange his estate. An outraged Harris insisted on an ostentatiously large funeral procession, with the participation of all the foreign missions in Japan. Japanese officials attempted to discourage this assembly, fearing further attacks, but eventually conceded and implemented extensive security precautions. Heusken was buried without incident at the cemetery at Korin-ji in Edo on January 18.

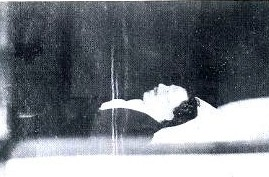
The body of Henry Heusken soon after death

Immediately after the funeral, most western diplomats retreated from Edo to Yokohama and brought ashore greater numbers of French and British soldiers for protection as trade dwindled. The "yet unpunished and unatoned homicide of Mr. Heusken" was cited by William H. Seward as a hindering factor in relations between the U.S. and Japan during this period. No one was ever convicted of the murder, and the only reparation made by the government of Japan was a $10,000 payment to Heusken's mother, who had been reliant on her son's income due to long-term illness.

Heusken kept a diary (written in French) during his time in Japan, which was translated and published in 1964 as "Japan Journal 1855-1861". A lifelong romantic, he waxed poetic regarding "these beneficial beings called women," and had at least one son, with a Japanese woman named Otsuru, whose fate is not known.

== See also ==
- List of Westerners who visited Japan before 1868
- Charles Lennox Richardson
- Sakoku

== Bibliography ==
- de Goey, Ferry (2018). "Western Entrepreneurs and the Opening of Japanese Ports (c. 1858–1868)". In Hoare, Jim (ed.). Culture, Power and Politics in Treaty-Port Japan, 1854-1899. Folkstone, Kent: Renaissance Books. ISBN 978-1-898823-61-2.
- Harris, Townsend (1930). The Complete Journal of Townsend Harris. Garden City, NY: Doubleday, Doran & Company.
- Hesselink, Reinier (1994). "The Assassination of Henry Heusken". Monumenta Nipponica. 49 (3): 331–351. doi:10.2307/2385453. JSTOR 2385453.
- Patterson, Richard S. (1947). "Henry C. J. Heusken, Interpreter to the First American Consular and Diplomatic Posts in Japan". The Foreign Service Journal. Vol. 24, no. 7. pp. 14–15, 50–55.
- Szippl, Richard (2018). "Wilhelm Heine and the Opening of Japan" (PDF). The Bulletin of the Nanzan Center for European Studies (24): 63–103.
- van der Corput, Jeannette C.; Wilson, Robert A., eds. (1964). Japan Journal 1855-1861. New Brunswick, NJ: Rutgers University Press. LCCN 63-23314.
