= Dirk de Graeff van Polsbroek =

Dutch aristocrat and diplomat (1833–1916)

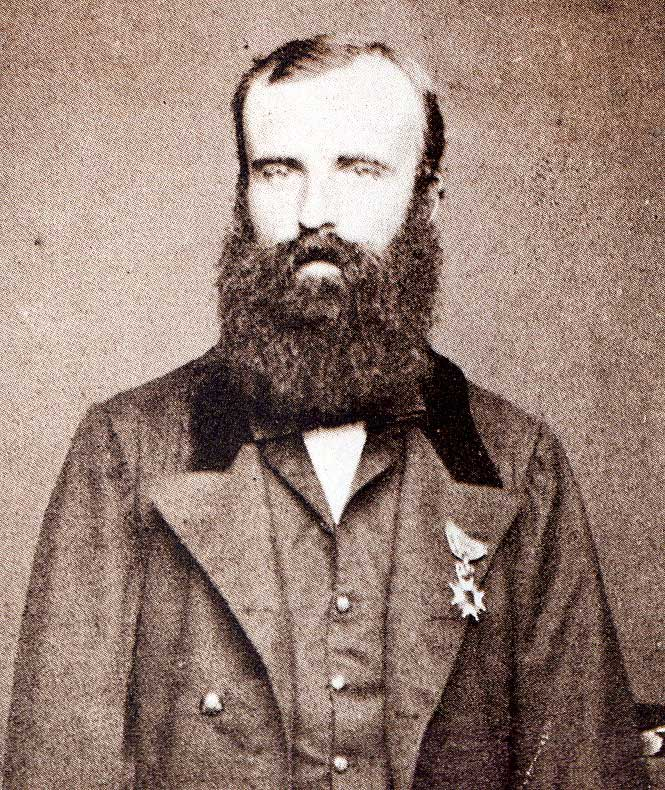
Dirk de Graeff van Polsbroek

Jonkheer Dirk de Graeff van Polsbroek (born Dirk de Graeff; named also Van Polsbroek or Polsbroek) (Amsterdam, 28 August 1833 – 27 June 1916, The Hague) was a Dutch aristocrat, merchant and diplomat. Between 1863 and 1868 he was Dutch Consul General and then until 1870 Dutch Minister-Resident and de facto envoy to Japan. Since no ambassadors were planned at that time, his legation fulfilled the same task. De Graeff van Polsbroek was an important representative of the Dutch government who laid the foundation for modern diplomatic representation in Japan and the first diplomat with permanent residence in Japan (comparable to a modern ambassador).

At the time of his activity in Japan, he assisted Emperor Meiji and his government as a councillor in negotiations with Western states. He was a representative, envoy and plenipotentiary minister of various European states and, due to his relationship with Meiji, the Japanese government and his knowledge of the state, played a central role in negotiations and the conclusion of treaties between Japan, which was opening up to the West, and the various Western states, as a result, they were able to conclude numerous profitable commercial contracts. Dirk de Graeff van Polsbroek was also a chronicler and important collector of photographs of Japanese social change at the time of the Meiji Restoration.

== Biography ==
=== Family ===
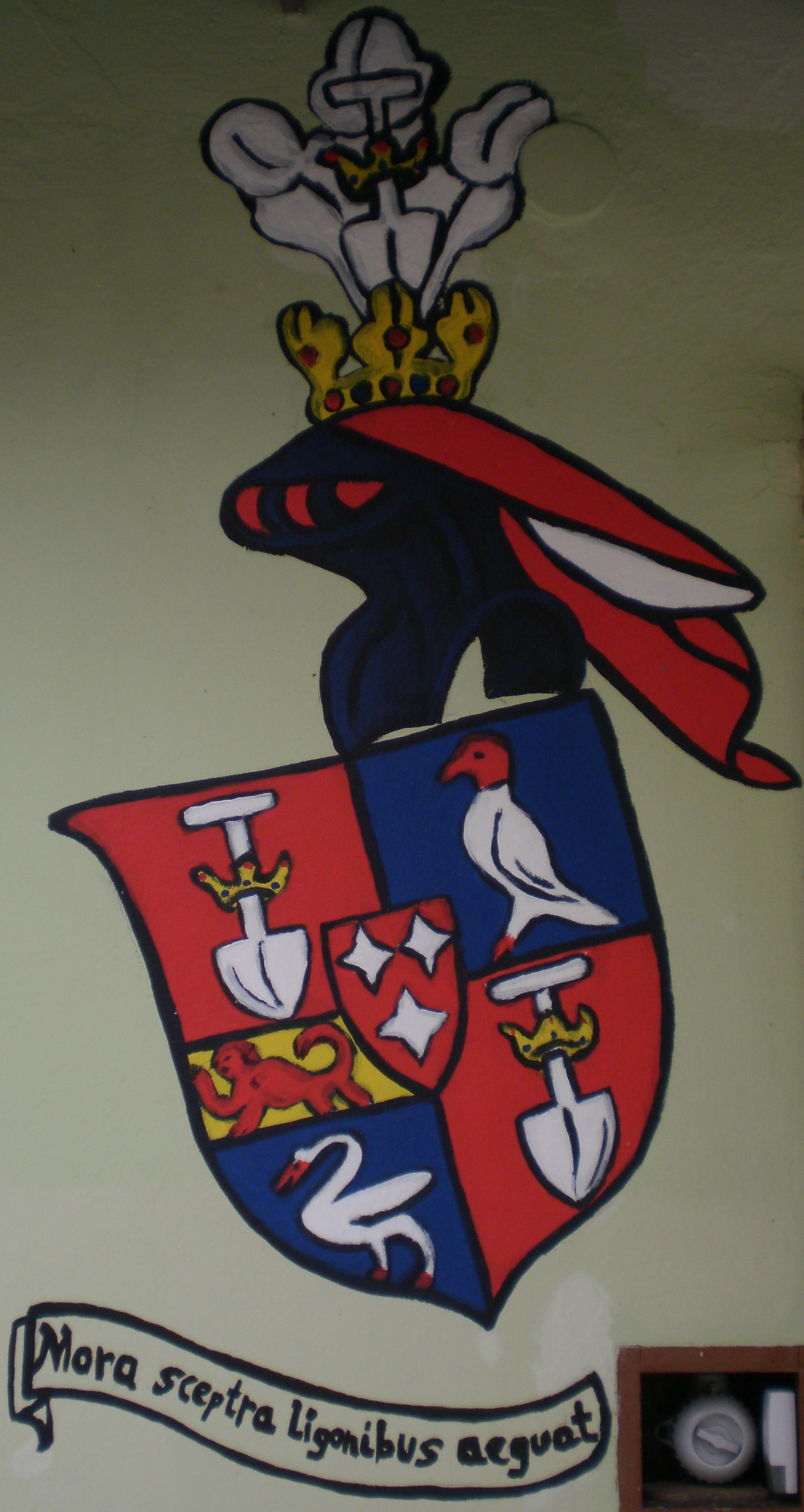
Former full coat of arms De Graeff, free Lords of Zuid-Polsbroek, Purmerland and Ilpendam (painted by Matthias Laurenz Gräff, 2011)

Coat of arms Dirk de Graeff van Polsbroek (1885 creation)

Dirk de Graeff van Polsbroek was born at Amsterdam on 28 August 1833 as a son of Gerrit de Graeff (IV) Squire of Zuid-Polsbroek, Purmerland and Ilpendam and Carolina Ursulina Stephania Engels. The family De Graeff van Polsbroek belonged to the patrician class of Amsterdam and held the feudal titles Free Lord of Zuid-Polsbroek as those of Purmerland and Ilpendam. Dirk lived in Japan with his Japanese housekeeper Koyama Ochō with whom he had a son Pieter de Graeff (Yokohama, 8 June 1861 - 7 August 1914, Bwool, Netherlands Indies). It has also been suggested that he was married to a Japanese princess during his time in Japan. In 1872 he married Bonne Elisabeth Roijer (also Royer) (1847-1927), daughter of the naval captain Georg Roijer (also Royer) (1817-1871) and Anna Petronella Barones Mulert to de Leemcule (1815-1909) as well as maternal granddaughter of Adriana Petronella Imperial countess of Nassau-LaLecq (1757-1789) and thus a direct descendant of prince William the Silent (William I of Orange-Nassau) and Maurice, Prince of Orange. They had six children, one of whom died young:

- Jkvr. Anna Carolina de Graeff (1871–1966)
- Jhr. Andries Cornelis Dirk de Graeff (1872–1957), statesman and diplomat
- Jhr. Géorg de Graeff (1873–1954), Inspector of Public Health in Zeeland and North Holland, Chairman of the Remonstrant Brotherhood; Lidia married Christine Adelaide Dijckmeester (1883-1971), whose son Jhr. Dirk Georg de Graeff made a great career as a manager, banker and at the Dutch royal court
- Jhr. Jacob de Graeff (1875–1963), in 1914 Deputy director of the Deli brewery in Amsterdam
- Carolina Frederika Christina de Graeff (1877–1879), died young
- Jhr. Cornelis de Graeff (1881–1956), Commissioner of the Department of Foreign Policy; married Jkvr. Susanna Ignatia Caroline Elisabeth Loudon (1884-1957)

==== A Historic Lineage ====
Dirk de Graeff van Polsbroek had a very long ancestral lineage, including some of the most prominent persons of the Dutch Republic during the Golden Age, such as the republican minded brothers Cornelis (1599-1664) and Andries de Graeff (1611-1678), who in 1660 assisted with the provision of the Dutch Gift. The Dutch Gift was a collection of 28 mostly Italian Renaissance paintings and 12 classical sculptures, along with a yacht, the Mary, and furniture, which was presented by the States-General of the Netherlands in 1660 to King Charles II of England upon his restoration to the English throne. A major patron of the arts, Andries de Graeff's full length portrait was created by Rembrandt van Rijn in 1639.

=== Career in Japan ===
==== Consul and Consul General ====
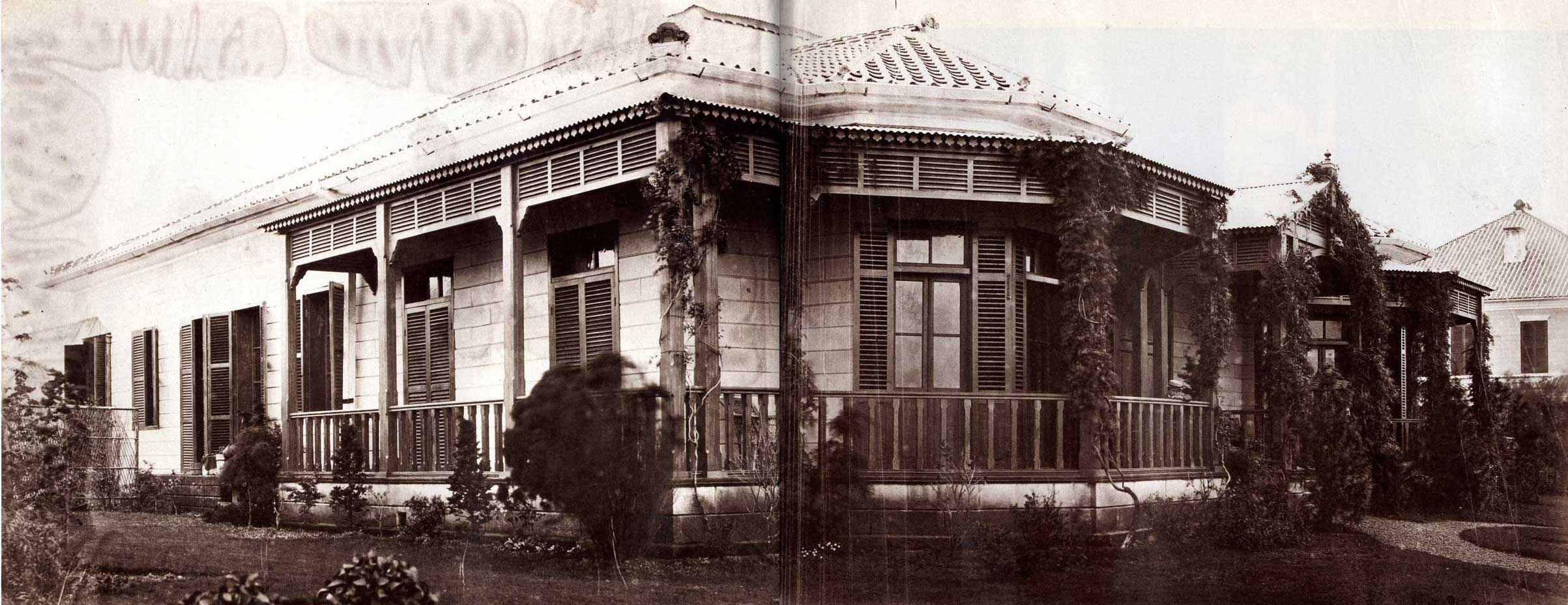
Dirk de Graeff van Polsbroek's home in Yokohama (photograph from 1868)

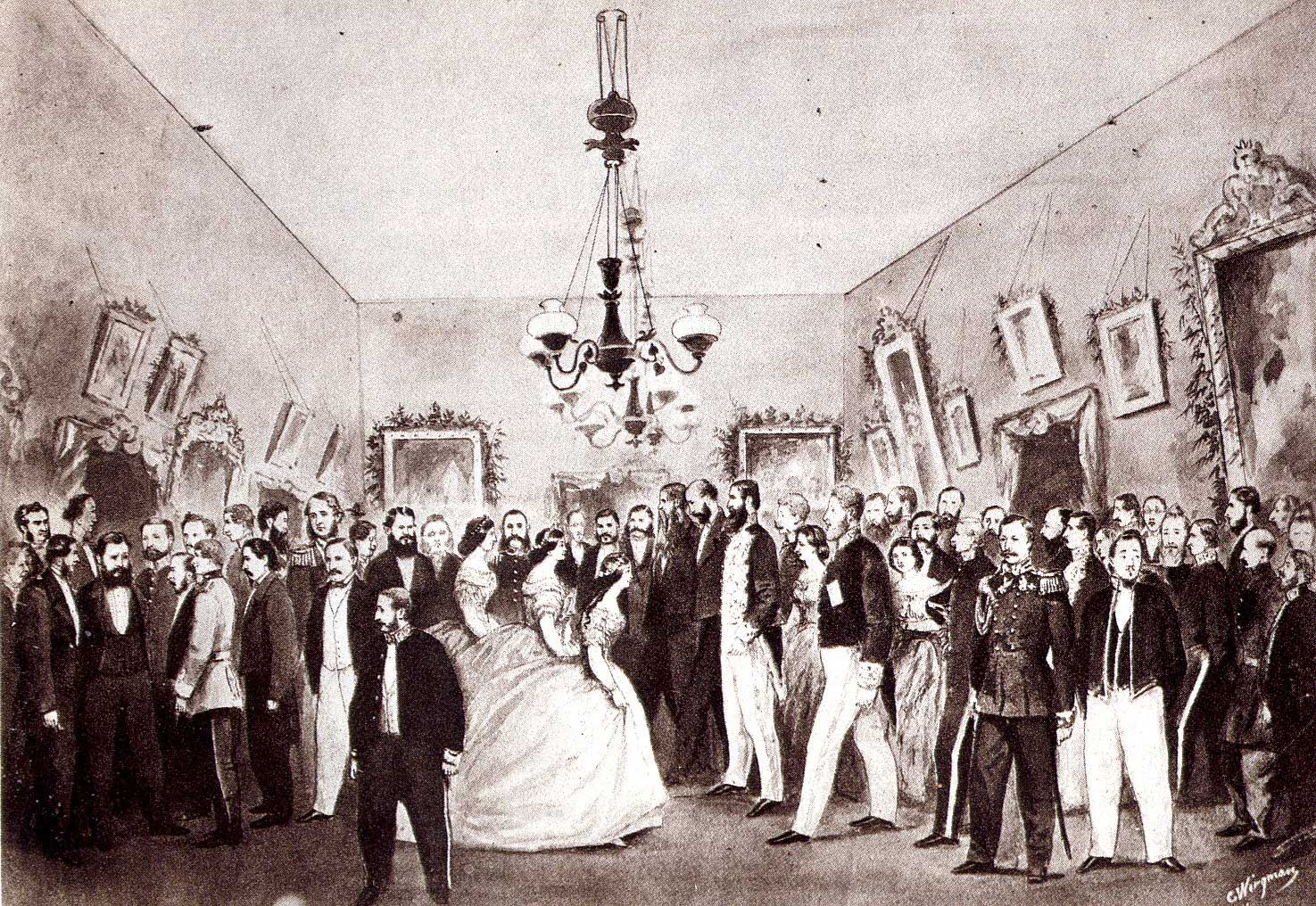
Grand Ball at Dirk de Graeff van Polsbroek home in Yokohama. Drawn in 1863 by Charles Wirgman and photographed by Felice Beato

When De Graeff went to the Dutch Indies in 1853 he added 'van Polsbroek' to his name, probably to discern himself from his brother colonel Gijsbert Carel Rutger Reinier de Graeff in the Colonial Army there. After having worked for the Netherlands Indian government in Batavia, in 1856 as secretary, he was appointed on Dejima in June 1857 as assistant 2nd class to the Factory of Dutch Trade led by Janus Henricus Donker Curtius. He was partner in Textor & Co., a trading company established at Dejima in 1858 with his colleague Carl Julius Textor. He was one of the founders of the Yokohama Races (horse racing in Yokohama) In 1859 he became acting Vice-Consul at Kanagawa. Before July 1, 1859, the official opening of the Japanese harbours to trade with foreign countries, the first US Consul Townsend Harris met De Graeff van Polsbroek and the British Consul General Rutherford Alcock for an exchange at the port of Yokohama. The relationship between De Graeff van Polsbroek and Harris and Alcock was an intimate one, which is also documented by various visits. On January 15, 1861, his friend Hendrick Heusken, a Dutch citizen employed by Harris in Edo as a secretary and interpreter, succumbed to his wounds he received the day before in an attack by anti-Western ronin (samurai). De Graeff van Polsbroek immediately arrived from Kanagawa to arrange his estate. On September 18, 1862, Dirk de Graeff van Polsbroek was inducted as a knight in the Order of the Netherlands Lion. The arrival of the first Prussian consul (for the North German Confederation) Max August Scipio von Brandt in late 1862 completed the line of the few western diplomats in Japan. In addition to the newcomer, these were the diplomats De Graeff van Polsbroek, Harris, Alcock and the French Minister-Resident Gustave Duchesne, Prince de Bellecourt, who had been present since the later 1850s and played an important role in Japan in the 1860s. Although these men were bound by personal friendship, national rivalries and differences in dealing with the Japanese led to conflict and antagonism. However, the chaotic and ungovernable circumstances of the first few years forced them to cooperate. In 1863, when the direction of the Japanese affairs changed from the Ministry of the Colonies to that for Foreign Affairs, he was appointed Consul General as successor of Jan Karel de Wit, and Political Agent. He supported the Dutch intervention in the 20 July 1863 Bombardment of Shimonoseki and the August 1863 armed intervention of the United allies together with Britain, US and France in the Bombardment of Kagoshima.

==== Successful western diplomat ====
When Switzerland also sent a representative to Japan in 1863/64, Aimé Humbert, De Graeff van Polsbroek supported him in negotiations with the Japanese government officials in Edo in order to conclude a bilateral treaty. After Humbert left Japan, De Graeff van Polsbroek represented Switzerland as interim Consul General. In 1866 he had also taken over Belgian interests in Japan. In the same year he also took over the Prussian representation and reported to chancellor Otto von Bismarck that the wage agreement had come about and that Japanese people were allowed to go abroad in the course of their studies.

On June 25, 1866, Great Britain, the USA, France and the Netherlands signed a convention on the import and export of goods with Japan. De Graeff van Polsbroek signed the contract for the Netherlands. In early 1867 the Kingdom of Denmark established diplomatic relations with Japan and handed over its representation to De Graeff van Polsbroek. On January 12, 1867, he was able to sign his trade and friendship treaty between the two states, which he had negotiated with Japan. In the case of the Kingdom of Denmark, De Graeff van Polsbroek was its first diplomatic representative as early as 1867, because Danish interests were represented by Dutch diplomacy until 1912. He was able to negotiate important trade agreements on behalf of Denmark. At the same time he also negotiated treaties for the North German Confederation and the German Hanseatic cities. They thanked De Graeff van Polsbroek with a golden tobacco box decorated with their coat of arms.

===== Cooperation with Emperor Meiji =====
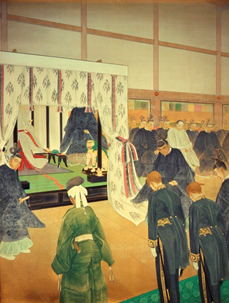
Emperor Meiji receives Dirk de Graeff van Polsbroek in 1868

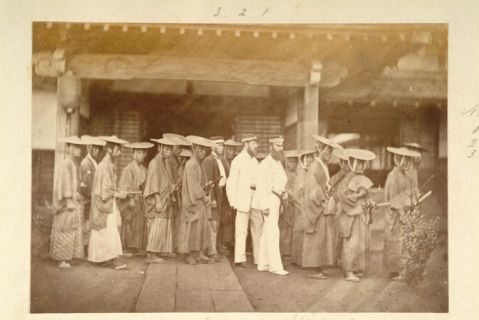
De Graeff van Polsbroek with Japanese bodyguards on a tour of Edo (Tokyo)

In 1868 De Graeff van Polsbroek became (titular) Resident Minister of The Netherlands in Japan. He ended his career as a diplomat in 1870 by refusing an appointment in Peking. On March 23, 1868, De Graeff van Polsbroek and the French Minister-Resident Léon Roches were the first European envoys ever to receive a personal audience with the new Emperor Meiji in Edo (Tokyo). This audience laid the foundation for (modern) Dutch diplomacy in Japan. Subsequently, De Graeff van Polsbroek assisted the emperor and the government in their negotiations with representatives of the major European powers. This incident also found its way into the film The Last Samurai in a slightly modified form. Meiji's goal was to open Japan to the West. However, he told De Graeff van Polsbroek in no uncertain terms that he would dissolve the unequal treaties that the European states had long had in their favor with enforced treaties in the Japanese arts. However, since Meiji wanted to enter into diplomatic relations with the major European powers, he asked De Graeff van Polsbroek for his support. As a consequence of this discussion, he represented not only the Netherlands but also the states of Denmark, Sweden-Norway and Prussia as Minister Plenipotentiary and envoy. He was also able to conclude trade agreements with Japan for the Kingdom of Belgium.

De Graeff van Polsbroek played a central role in establishing the political and economic relations between the Scandinavian states of Denmark and Sweden-Norway and Japan. Due to his good relationship with Meiji and the Japanese government, he was able to commission and in the name of Charles XV of Sweden-Norway on November 11, 1868 concluded a trade agreement, the so-called "Verdrag van Yokohama" ("Vänskaps-, handels- och sjöfartstraktat") between Sweden-Norway, Denmark and Japan. This treaty opened Hakodate, Yokohama, Nagasaki, Kobe and Osaka to trade for Swedish and Norwegian traders (Article 3). He also gave Sweden-Norway the opportunity to send consuls to the newly opened ports, where they were given the right, through consular jurisdiction, to exercise jurisdiction over the Swedes and Norwegians present there. In the following year De Graeff van Polsbroek was the first western diplomat, who presented his credentials to Meiji in his new capital Tokyo.

==== Journals and photograph albums ====
Between 1850 and 1870, at a time when Japan was modernizing and moving significantly closer to the West through Emperor Meiji, De Graeff van Polsbroek wrote numerous diaries, published under the name Journaal van Jonkheer Dirk de Graeff van Polsbroek 1857-1870; belevenissen van een Nederlands diplomaat in het negentiende eeuwse Japan, with some illustrations by the author. His work is a valuable document for researching the turning point in Japan. Although not a photographer himself, he was an important collector of early Japanese photographs, leaving three albums containing the work of a variety of Japanese and foreign photographers including Felice Beato.

=== Afterwards ===
On leave in The Netherlands in 1870, when he was ordered by the Minister for Foreign Affairs to Peking, De Graeff van Polsbroek resigned from his position and became a Commissioner of the Netherlands Trading Society (Nederlandsche Handel-maatschappij) living at The Hague. He was one of the eight members (together with King Willem III, three members of the Dutch Royal house including crown prince William, Foreign minister Louis Baron Gericke van Herwijnen, Consul Willem van der Tak and medic Johannes L. C. Pompe van Meerdervoort) of the government commission which received the Iwakura Mission to The Netherlands in 1873. In 1885 he and his descendants received the title of Jonkheer De Graeff and on that occasion he had to drop his self-styled addition to his name 'Van Polsbroek'.

Dirk de Graeff died on 27 June 1916 at The Hague.

== Literature ==
- Graeff van Polsbroek, Dirk de (1987), Journaal van Jonkheer Dirk de Graeff van Polsbroek, 1857-1870: Belevenissen van een Nederlands diplomaat in het negentiende eeuwse Japan. (ingeleid en geannoteerd door Herman J. Moeshart) Assen, Van Gorcum, ISBN 90-232-2257-1
- Graeff van Polsbroek, Dirk de, "Aanval in de Japansche wateren op de Nederlandsche stoomkorvet Medusa". Koloniale Jaarboeken, vol. jrg. 3.
- Edström, Bert, en Lars Vargö, red. Sverige och Japan: Diplomatiska dokument från tre sekler. Stockholm: Utrikesdepartementet, 2000.
- Ottosson, Ingemar: Svensk frihandelsimperialism: Det ojämlika fördraget med Japan 1868-1896, uit Historisk tidskrift, nummer 2 (1997), p 199–223
- Dr H.J. Moeshart, A List of Names of Foreigners in Japan in Bakumatsu and early Meiji (1850-1900) (Amsterdam 2010) p 102.
- Dr. H.J. Moeshart 'Dirk de Graeff and the Opening of Japan' (Batavian Lion International, Amsterdam, 2018).
