= Eiko Ando =

Japanese-American actress (1934–2018)

- Born: May 8, 1934; Harbin, Manchukuo (today China)
- Died: August 28, 2018 (aged 84); New York, U.S.
- Occupation: Actress
- Years active: 1958

Eiko Ando (安藤 永子, Andō Eiko; May 8, 1934 – August 28, 2018) was a Japanese-American actress best known for her role as Okichi opposite John Wayne in The Barbarian and the Geisha in 1958.

== Early life ==
Ando was born in Harbin, Heilongjiang, in the Japanese puppet state of Manchukuo (today Northeast China), to a Japanese industrialist. When the Communists took over the family fled back to Japan. After her father died in 1953, she went to work as a singer and then as a burlesque dancer.

== Career ==
When director John Huston was looking for an actress for the part of Okichi in The Barbarian and the Geisha, a friend of Ando's who worked in the Tokyo office of 20th Century-Fox recommended Ando for the role. After Huston saw her audition, he and producer Eugene Frenke chose her over 33 other actresses, mainly because she was taller than most of the other women. "While the Japanese actress Eiko Ando has little more to do than look pretty and give an impression of being in silent awe of a man, she does it with rare grace of movement and fragile femininity," wrote Bosley Crowther in his review of the film for The New York Times.

Ando died in New York on August 28, 2018, at the age of 84.
