= Zenpuku-ji =

Buddhist temple in Tokyo, Japan

Zenpuku-ji 善福寺
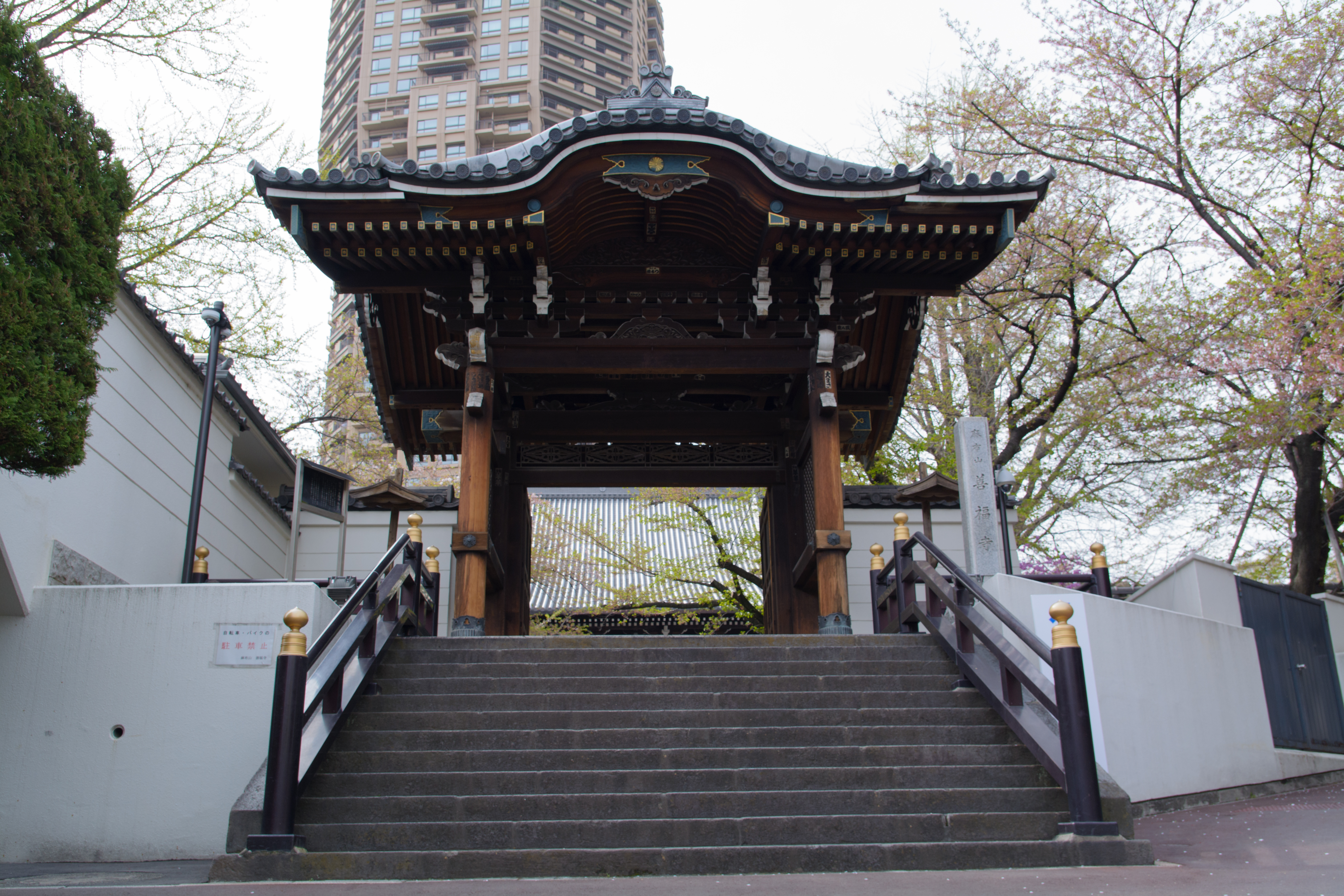
- Central gate (chokushimon)

Religion
- Affiliation: Jōdo Shinshū Honganji-ha
- Deity: Amida Nyorai (Amitābha)

Location
- Location: 1-6-21 Motoazabu, Minato-ku, Tokyo Prefecture
- Country: Japan
- Interactive map of Zenpuku-ji 善福寺
- Coordinates: 35°39′12.8″N 139°43′58.1″E

Architecture
- Founder: Kūkai (acc. legend)
- Completed: 824; 1202 years ago (legend)

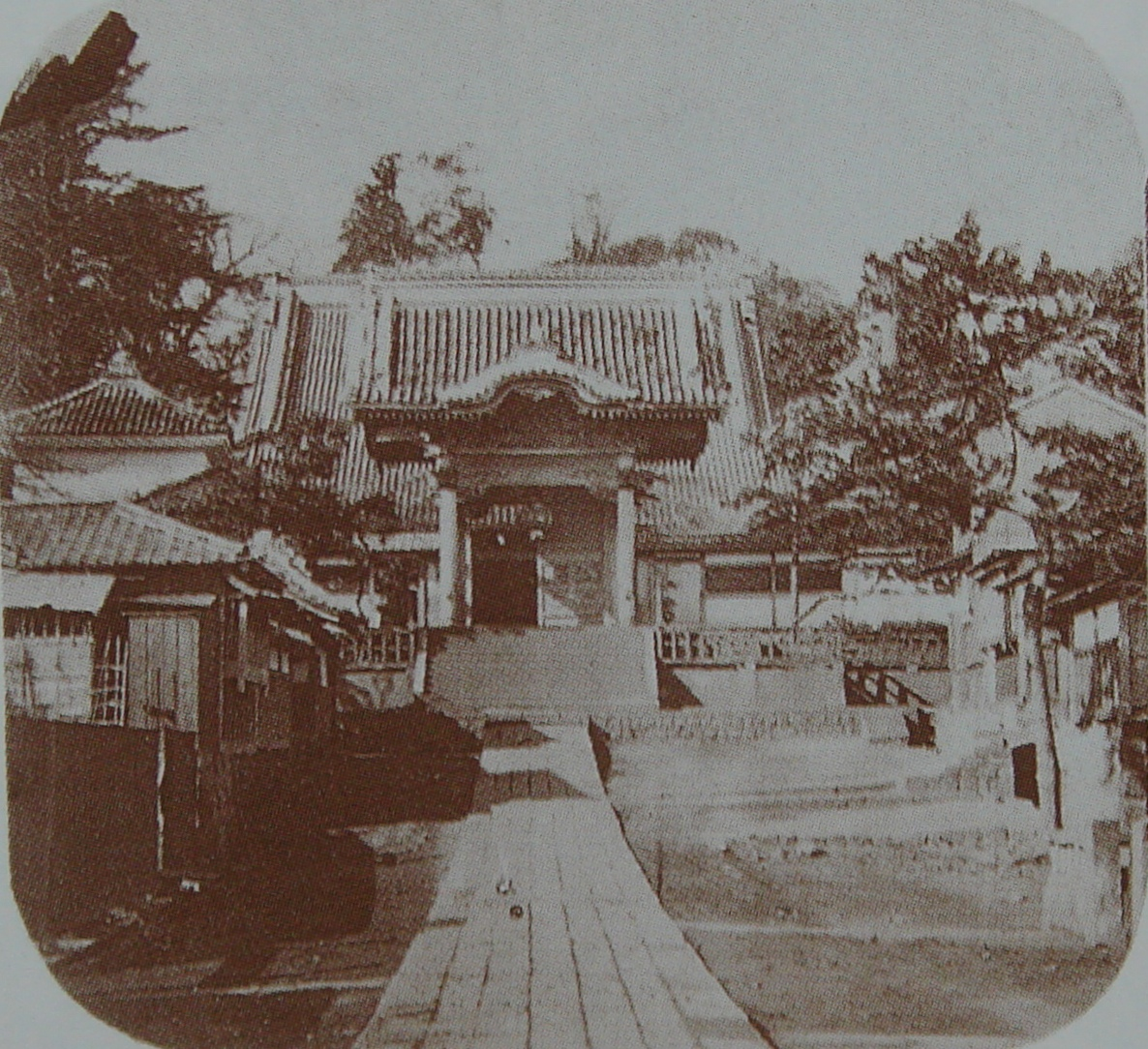
US Legation in Zenpuku-ji, c. 1861

Zenpuku-ji (善福寺), also known as Azabu-san (麻布山), is a Jōdo Shinshū temple located in the Azabu district of Tokyo, Japan. It is one of the oldest Tokyo temples, after Asakusa. The temple is designated as a Historical Site by the Tokyo Metropolitan Government.

== History ==
Founded by Kūkai in 824, Zenpuku-ji was originally a Shingon temple. The Buddhist monk Shinran visited the temple during the Kamakura period and convinced the abbot of the time, Ryōkai, to convert the temple to the Jodo Shinshu sect.

During the 1570-80 Ishiyama Hongan-ji War between Oda Nobunaga and the Ikkō-ikki warrior monks, Zenpuki-ji sent reinforcements to support Ishiyama Hongan-ji forces in Osaka. After the end of the conflict in 1580, Oda’s successor, Toyotomi Hideyoshi declared peace and vowed to protect Zenpuku-ji’s holdings.

The third shogun, Tokugawa Iemitsu donated a new main hall to the temple. This main hall was the building later used by the first American legation to the shogun after the opening of Japan at the end of the Tokugawa Shogunate. This hall was destroyed in an air raid in May 1945, and then replaced with a building moved from Higashi-Hongan-ji Yao Betsuin in 1961.

=== American Legation ===
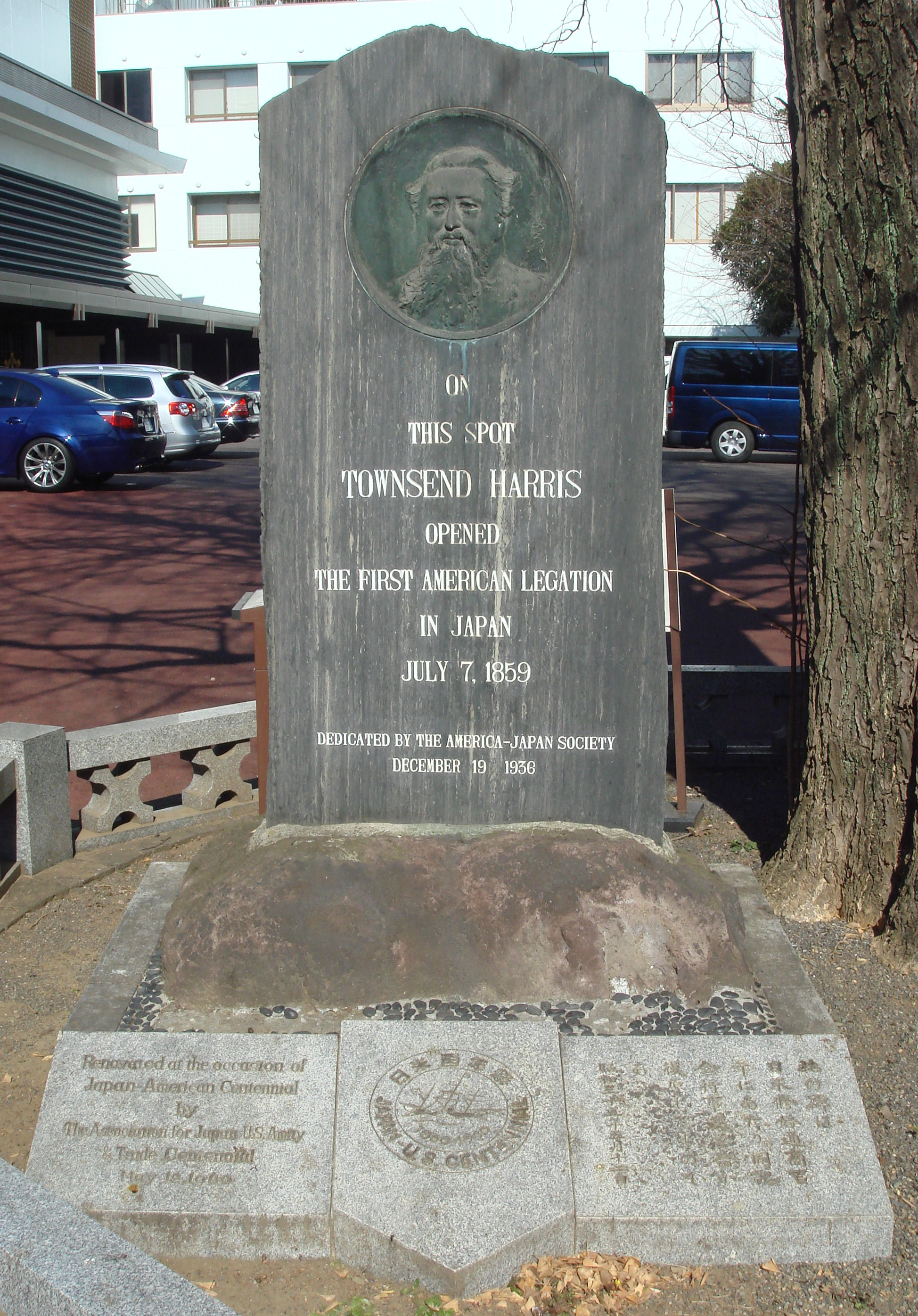
Townsend Harris monument in Zenpuku-ji

Under the 1859 Treaty of Amity and Commerce, the first Tokyo legation of the United States of America was established at Zenpuku-ji under Consul-General Townsend Harris. Letters from the time describe his accommodations as inconvenient and cramped, as the 18-19 members of the American legation shared the south side of the main hall, and a few surrounding rooms in an annex. The annex was burned down in an attack on the legation by samurai from the Mito Domain who opposed foreign influence.

When Townsend handed the Consul-Generalship over to his successor Robert H. Pruyn, and returned to America, he presented the abbot of the temple with 100 Ryō of gold in thanks for the temple’s hospitality.

== Features ==
- There is a monument to Townsend Harris and the First American Legation in Tokyo. The inscription on the monument reads - “On this spot, Townsend Harris opened the first American Legation in Japan, 1859. Dedicated by the America-Japan Society, December 19, 1936.” The monument became a target for anti-American feeling during World War Two, but was protected from damage throughout by the abbot of the temple.
- The hall in which the American Legation stayed burned down in May, 1945. The current main hall was moved from Higashi-Hongan-ji Yao Betsuin temple in 1961, and rebuilt into the main hall for Zenpuku-ji. It was renovated in 2008, and was afterwards designated as a Tangible Cultural Property of Minato-ku in 2009.
- A 750-year-old ginkgo tree at the entry to the cemetery, was purportedly planted by Shinran (legend has it that he struck the ground with his staff, and it quickly took root, sprouting into a tree), and is called "the upside down tree". It is the largest ginkgo in Tokyo today, being 20 meters tall and 10 meters in circumference, and is also believed to be the oldest Ginkgo tree in the Tokyo area. It was registered as a National Natural Monument by the Japanese government in 1926.
- A well in the approach to the shrine is supposed to have been struck by Kukai's bishop's staff. This well served the community during the Great Kantō earthquake and the Great Tokyo Air Raid.

== People associated with Zenpukuji ==
- Henry Heusken, attacked by rōnin at Nakanohashi on January 14, 1861, was brought back to Zenpukuji to die. The funeral procession from there to nearby Korinji was a critical confrontation between the bakufu and the foreign legations.
- Masuda Takashi, founder of Mitsui, served as an interpreter there at the age of 14.

== Notable interments ==
- Fukuzawa Yukichi, founder of Keio University
