= Ludovicus Stornebrink =

Dutch born Japanese businessman

Ludovicus Stornebrink, second from left, with his wife Hana (front row, 3rd from left) and 4 children.

Ludovicus Stornebrink (sometimes written as Ludowicus and also known as Louis Stornebrink), was the founder of the Yokohama Ice Works in Yokohama, Japan. Stornebrink was born on 15 March 1847 in Rotterdam, The Netherlands and moved to Japan at an early age. In 1879 he became the founder and owner of the Yokohama Ice Works, Yokohama's first ice factory.

Stornebrink married a Japanese wife, Hana Ohta, and they had four children. Stornebrink died on 17 September 1917 and is buried, together with his wife, who died the following year, at the Foreign General Cemetery in Yokohama. His sister, Gertrude Stornebrink (21 February 1851-September 1923) is buried in the same grave.
