= Gyokusen-ji =

Buddhist temple in Shizuoka Prefecture, Japan

- 玉泉寺
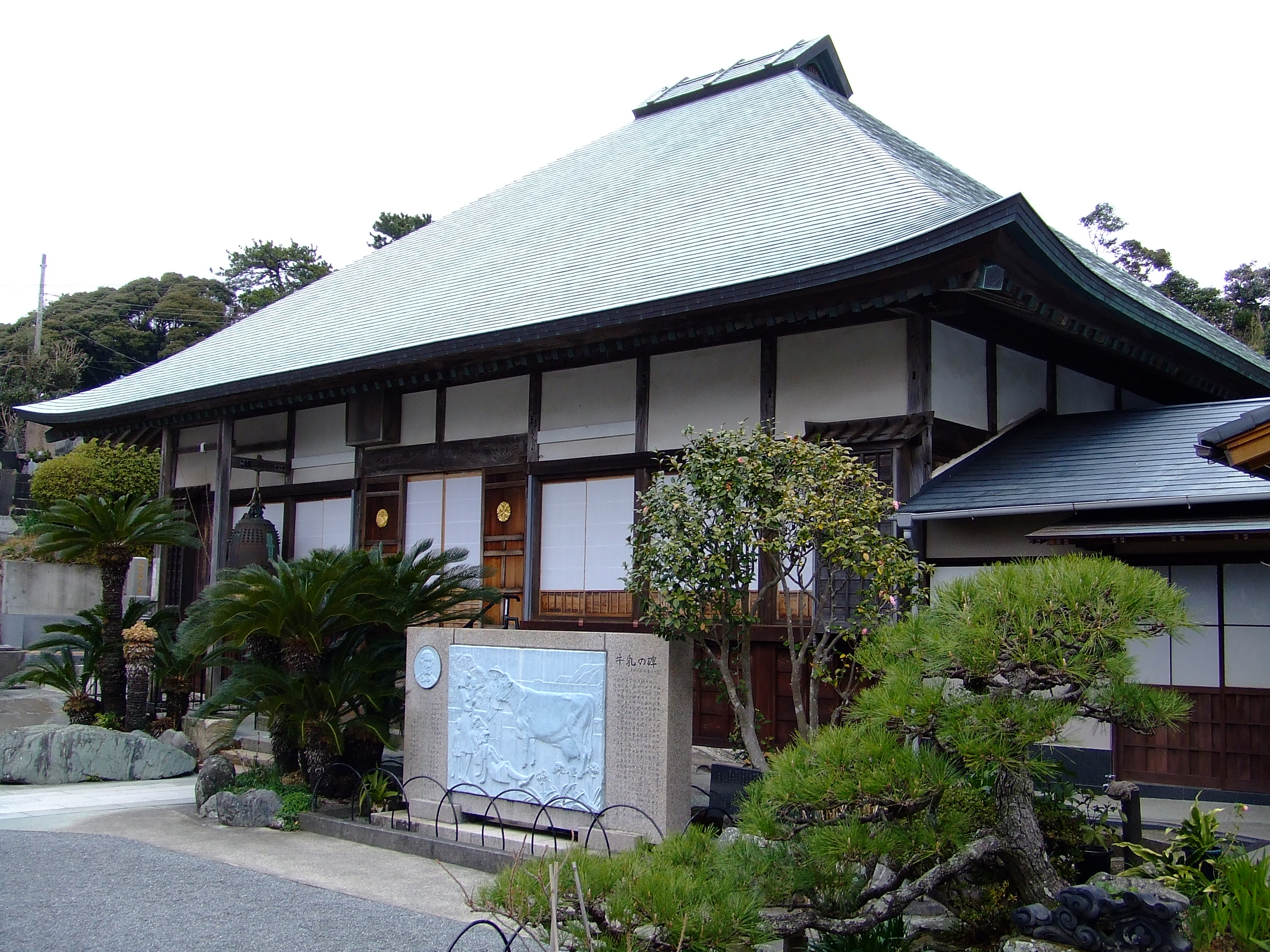
- Gyokusen-ji in Shimoda

- Location within Shizuoka Prefecture Location within Japan

Religion
- Affiliation: Buddhism
- Deity: Shaka Nyōrai
- Rite: Sōtō Zen

Location
- Location: Kakizaki 31-6, Shimoda-shi, Shizuoka
- Country: Japan
- Interactive map of Gyokusen-ji
- Coordinates: 34°40′33″N 138°57′45″E

Architecture
- Completed: Tenshō period (1573–1592)

Website
- gyokusenji.web.fc2.com

Gyokusen-ji (玉泉寺) is a Buddhist temple located in the city of Shimoda, Shizuoka Prefecture, Japan. It is noteworthy in that it served as the first American consulate in Japan. The temple and its grounds were designated as a National Historic Site of Japan in 1951.

== History ==
The exact date of the foundation of Gyokusen-ji is uncertain, but temple records indicate that it was originally a Shingon sect hermitage converted to the Sōtō Zen sect in the Tenshō period (1573–1592). The current Hondō was built in 1848, but soon after its completion it was commandeered by the Tokugawa shogunate for use as a residence for foreign visitors to Shimoda during negotiations to end Japan's national isolation policy. It hosted officers from American Commodore Matthew Perry’s flotilla of Black Ships, and Japanese authorities allowed the bodies of dead American sailors to be buried in its graveyard.

=== Visit by Admiral Putyatin ===
Gyokusen-ji was selected by officials of the Tokugawa shogunate to host Imperial Russian admiral Yevfimiy Putyatin and his officers during their stay in Shimoda. Putyatin had called at Shimoda on November 22, 1854, as it had been opened to the Americans by the Convention of Kanagawa, intending to continue on to Edo to press on with negotiations to establish a similar treaty between Japan and Russia. However, he became stranded in Shimoda due to a tsunami caused by the Ansei Tokai earthquake which destroyed his ships. Negotiations continued at Shimoda while Putyatin's worked on building a new ship at nearby Heda. These negotiations resulted in the Treaty of Shimoda on February 7, 1855, which opened the ports of Hakodate, Nagasaki and Shimoda to Russian vessels, permitted limited trading and the residence of a Russian consul, and fixed the border of Japan and Russia on the Kurile Islands between Urup and Iturup. The graves of four Russian sailors (three from the Diana and one from the Askold) who died while at Shimoda are located at the temple.

=== First US consulate in Japan ===
Shortly after the Russian delegation departed, Gyokusen-ji was again commandeered by the government. After the Treaty of Kanagawa theoretically opened Japan to the outside world, a group of American merchants landed in Shimoda and unsuccessfully attempted to open trade relations – an issue which had not yet been settled by treaty. This group resided at Gyokusen-ji after the departure of the Russians almost until the arrival of Townsend Harris, the first American Consul General to Japan in 1856, together with his secretary-interpreter Henry Heusken. The temple was used as their residence and as the official US consulate in Japan for a period of two years and ten months.

The temple has opened the Townsend Harris Museum, with documents, ukiyo-e, and dioramas describing the temple during the Bakumatsu period, along with a few of Townsend Harris's personal effects, the diary of Hamada Yoheiji, headman of Kakizaki village where the temple is located, and other items.

=== Foreign cemetery ===
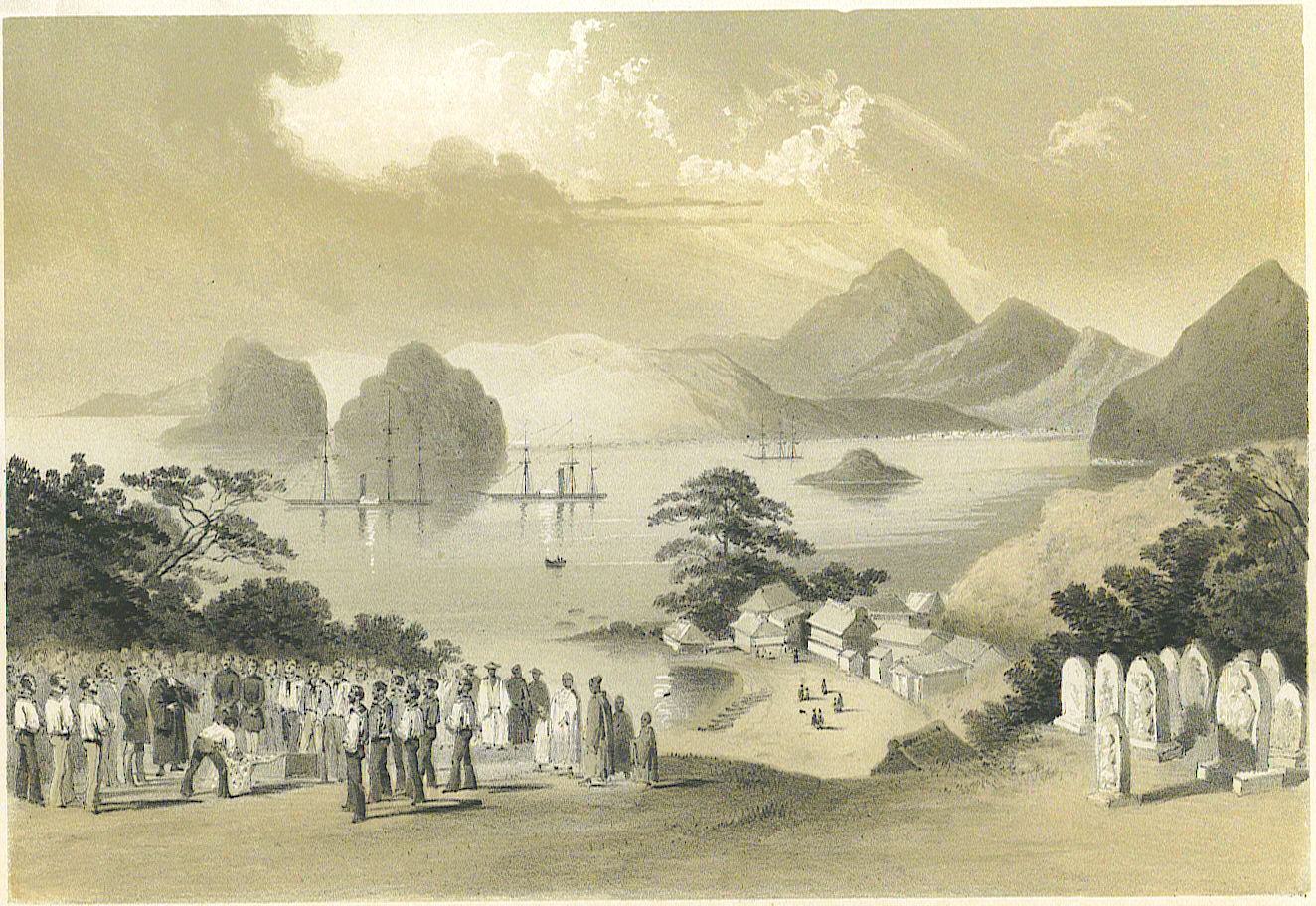
Foreign cemetery at Shimoda, Japan, 1854. Lithograph first published in 1856 by Wilhelm Heine

Five Americans and three Russians who died in Shimoda in the 1850s are buried in the temple cemetery. The five Americans buried at Gyokusen-ji are recorded as:

- Robert Williams, US Marine private who died from a fever while serving on the USS Mississippi (b. Hebron, Connecticut, d. 6 March 1854, aged 21). Williams body had initially been interred in Yokohama in a Christian burial service conducted by Revd. George Jones on the 9 March 1854. After the signing of the Convention of Kanagawa on 31 March 1854, a decision was made to relocate his grave to Shimoda, the designated treaty port, prior to the fleet's departure in June.
- G.W. Parish, USN sailor who died in a fall from rigging while serving on the USS Powhatan (d. 5 May 1854, aged 24)
- Jas. Hamilton, USN Assistant Surgeon on the USS Susquehanna (d. 6 September 1854, aged 38)
- John D. Storm, USN fireman serving on the USS Powhatan (b. Schoharie County, New York, d. 2 February 1855, aged 27)
- Alexander Doonan, US Marine serving on the USS Mississippi (d. 31 July 1858)

=== Other memorials ===
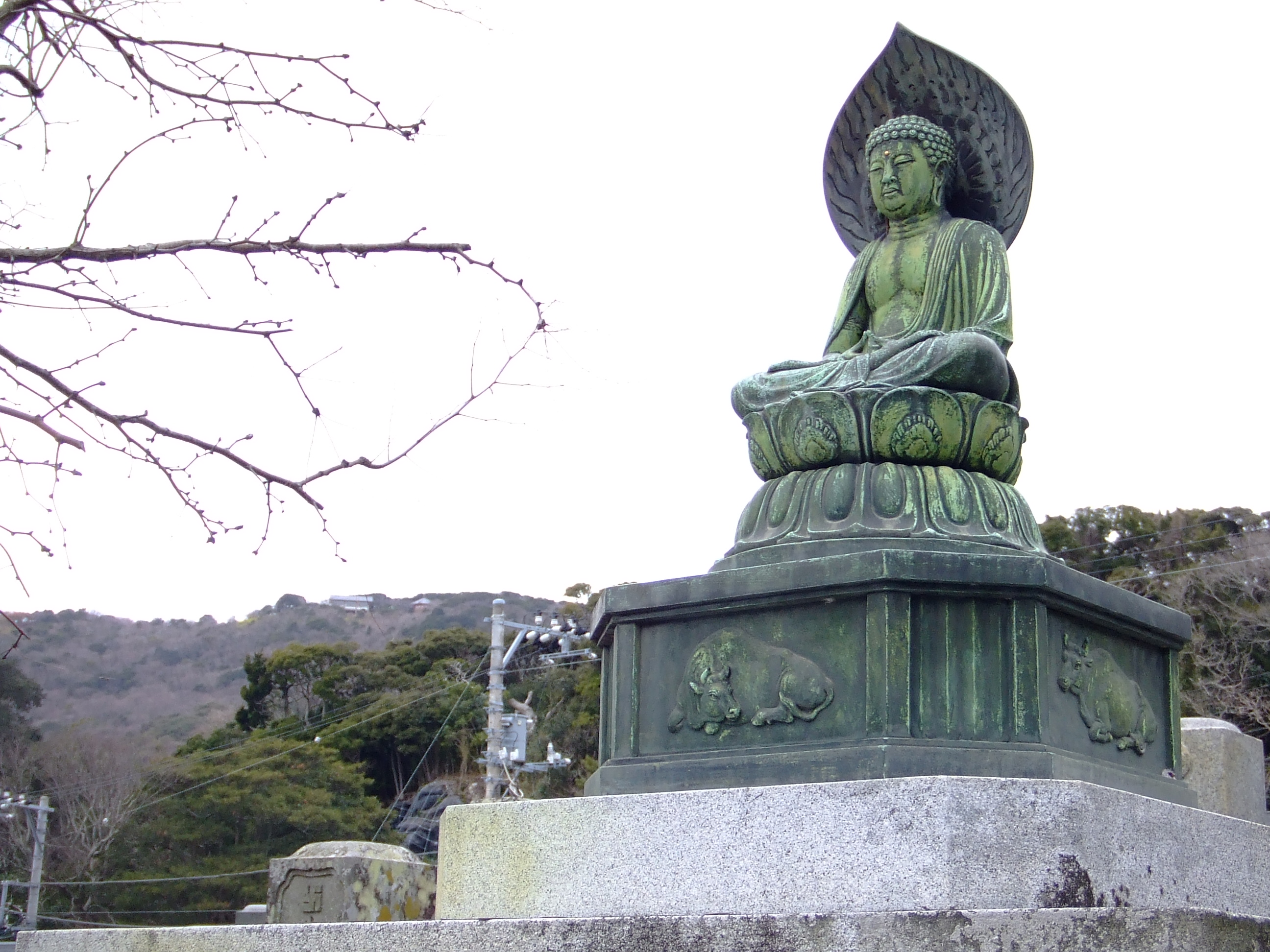
Monument to the first cow in Japan to be slaughtered for human consumption

Harris remained in residence at the temple for two years and ten months. During his stay, Harris demanded that the Japanese provide him with both milk and beef. Gyokusen-ji today has a monument decorated with the image of a cow, which the temple claims to mark the site where the first cow to be slaughtered in Japan for human consumption was killed. Its English language sign reads:

"This monument, erected in 1931 by the butchers of Tokyo, marks the spot where the first cow in Japan was slaughtered for human consumption. (Eaten by Harris and Heusken)".

Other memorials include a commemoration of the temple as the birthplace of Japanese milk production, and another commemorating the visit of President Jimmy Carter in 1979.

== See also ==
- List of Historic Sites of Japan (Shizuoka)

== Bibliography ==
- Statler, Oliver. Shimoda Story. University of Hawaii Press (1986) ISBN 0824810597
- Van Zandt, Howard F. Pioneer American Merchants in Japan. Lotus Press (1981). ASIN B001MSYALO
