= Townsend Harris =

American politician (1804–1878)

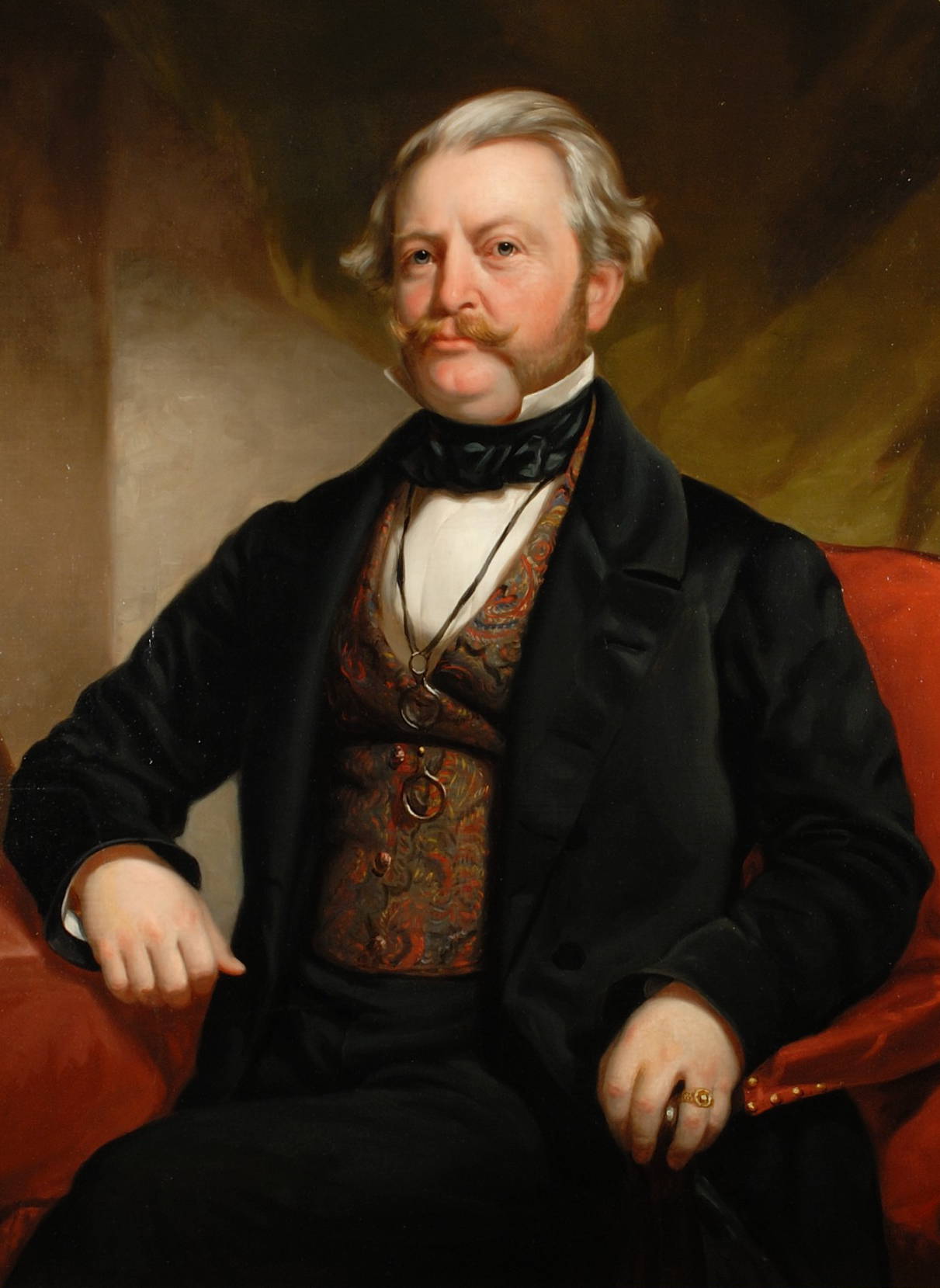
- 1855 portrait of Harris by James Bogle
- Born: October 4, 1804; Washington County, New York, US
- Died: February 25, 1878 (aged 73); New York City, US

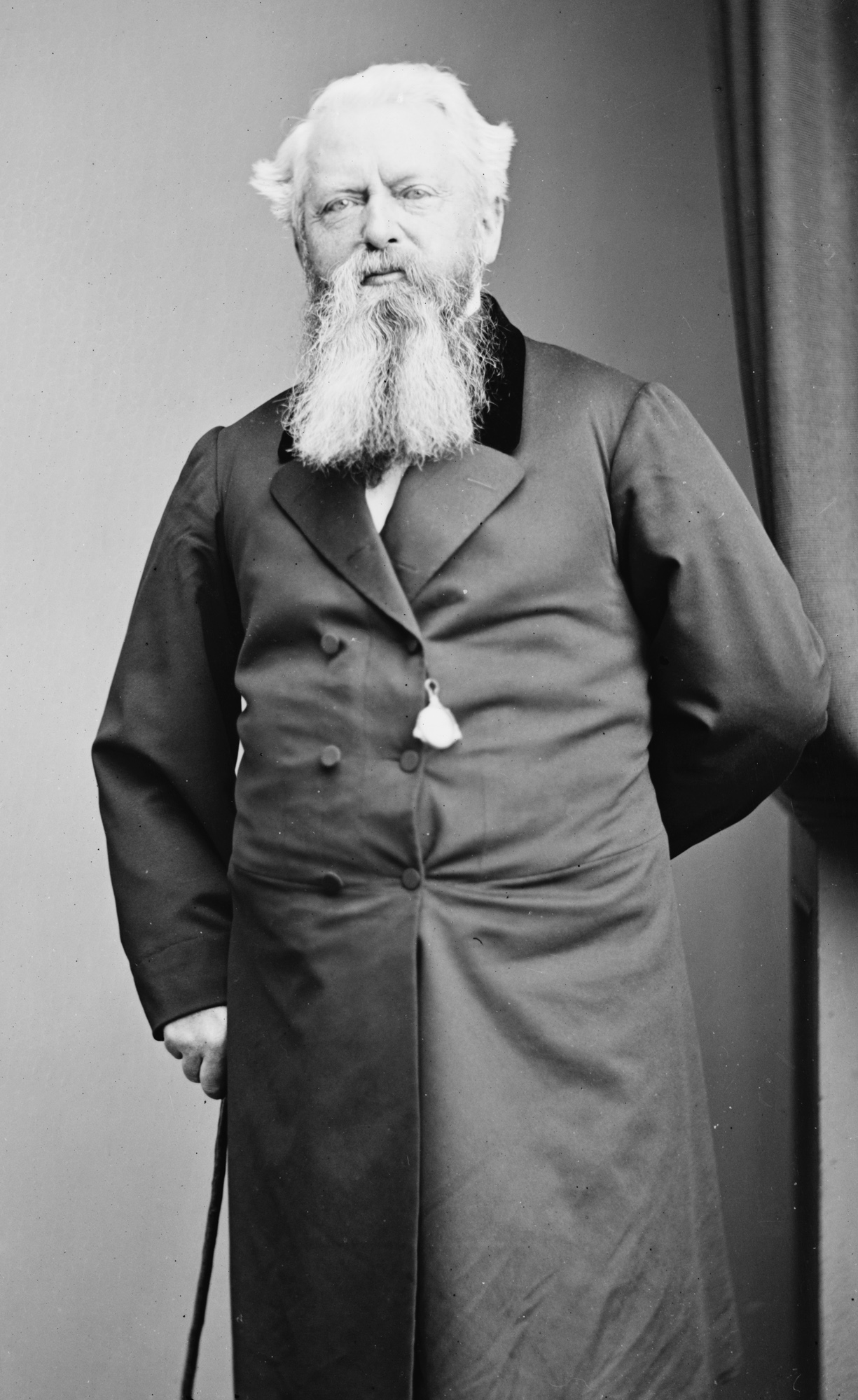
Townsend Harris in later life

Townsend Harris (October 4, 1804 – February 25, 1878) was an American merchant and politician who served as the first United States Consul General to Japan. He negotiated the Harris Treaty between the US and Japan and is credited as the diplomat who first opened Shogunate Japan to foreign trade and culture in the Edo period.

== In New York ==
Harris was born in the village of Sandy Hill (now Hudson Falls), in Washington County in upstate New York. He moved early to New York City, where he became a successful merchant and importer from China.

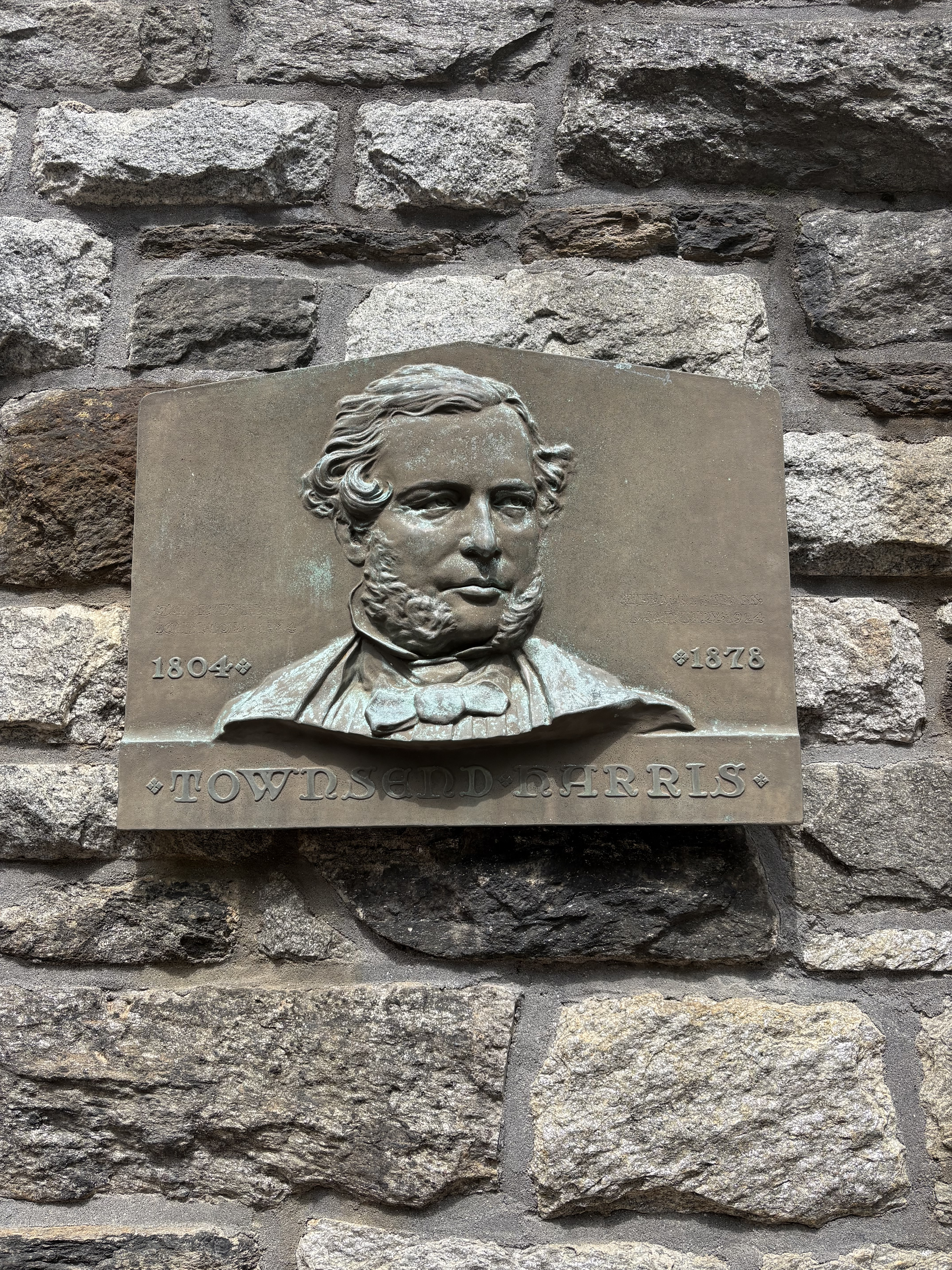
Cast bronze plaque of Townsend Harris on the Harris Hall at City College of New York.

In 1846, Harris joined the New York City Board of Education, serving as its president until 1848. He was an avid and critical reader and also taught himself French, Italian and Spanish. He founded the Free Academy of the City of New York, which later became the City College of New York, to provide education to the city's working people. A city high school bearing Harris's name, Townsend Harris High School, soon emerged as a separate entity out of the Free Academy's secondary-level curriculum; the school survived until 1942 when Mayor Fiorello La Guardia closed it because of budget constraints. Townsend Harris High School was re-created in 1984 as a public magnet school for the humanities.

== Harris Treaty of 1856 with Siam ==
Harris, though anxious to get to his new post in Japan, went first to Bangkok, to update the 1833 Roberts Treaty. In his formal audience with the English-speaking and Western-oriented Second King, Phra Pin Klao, Harris stated America's position:

The United States does not hold any possessions in the East, nor does it desire any. The form of government forbids the holding of colonies. The United States, therefore, cannot be an object of jealousy to any Eastern Power. Peaceful commercial relations, which give as well as receive benefits, is what the President wishes to establish with Siam, and such is the object of my mission.

Finalization of the Bowring Treaty of 1855 delayed Harris for about a month, but he had only to negotiate minor points to transform it into the Harris Treaty of 1856.

Re-designated the Treaty of Amity, Commerce, and Navigation, the amendments granted Americans extraterritorial rights in addition to those in the Roberts Treaty. American missionary Stephen Mattoon, who had acted as translator, was appointed the first United States consul to Siam.

== In Japan ==
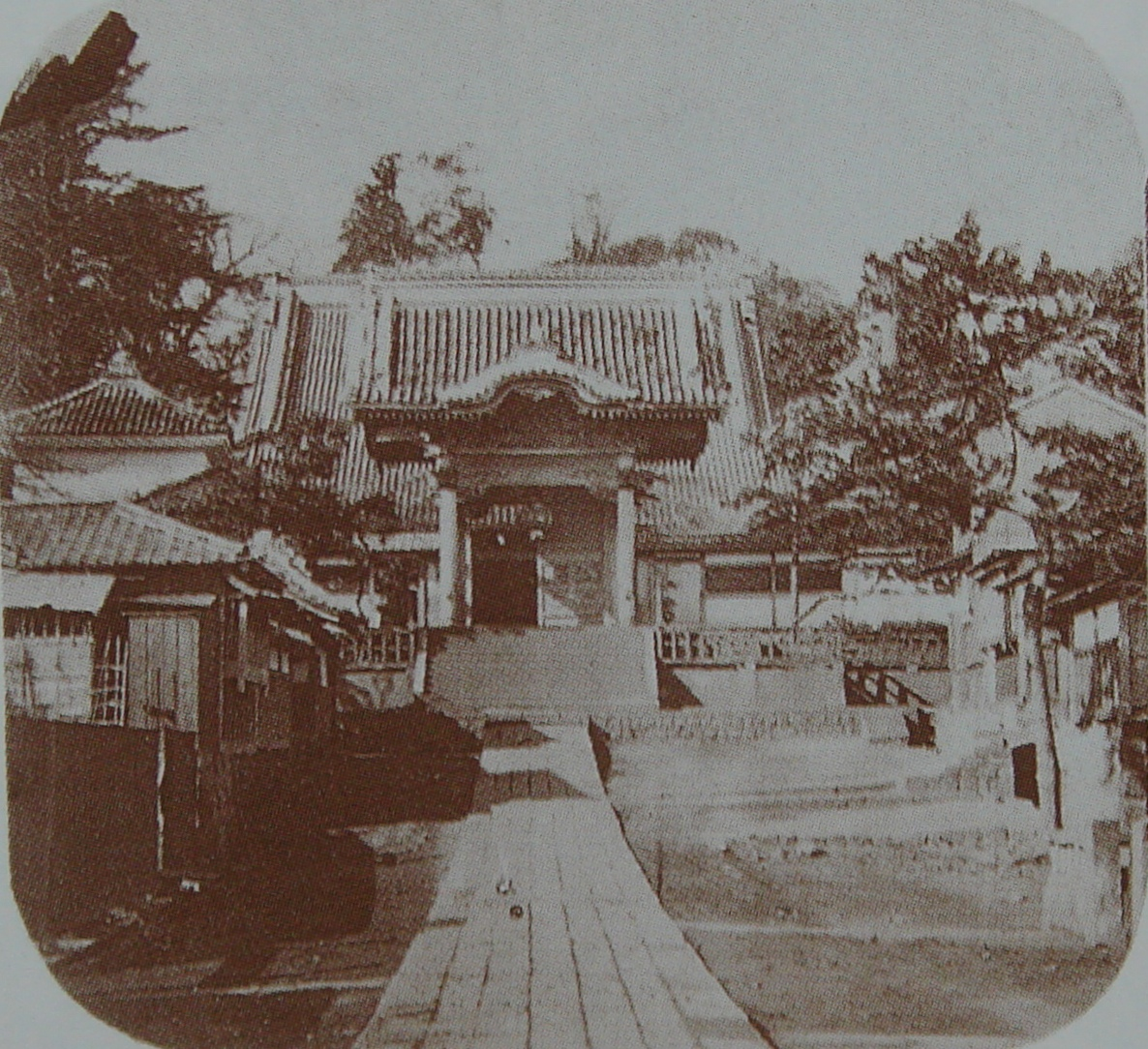
Townsend Harris had the US Legation relocate at the Zenpuku-ji Temple from 1859, following the Treaty of Amity and Commerce.

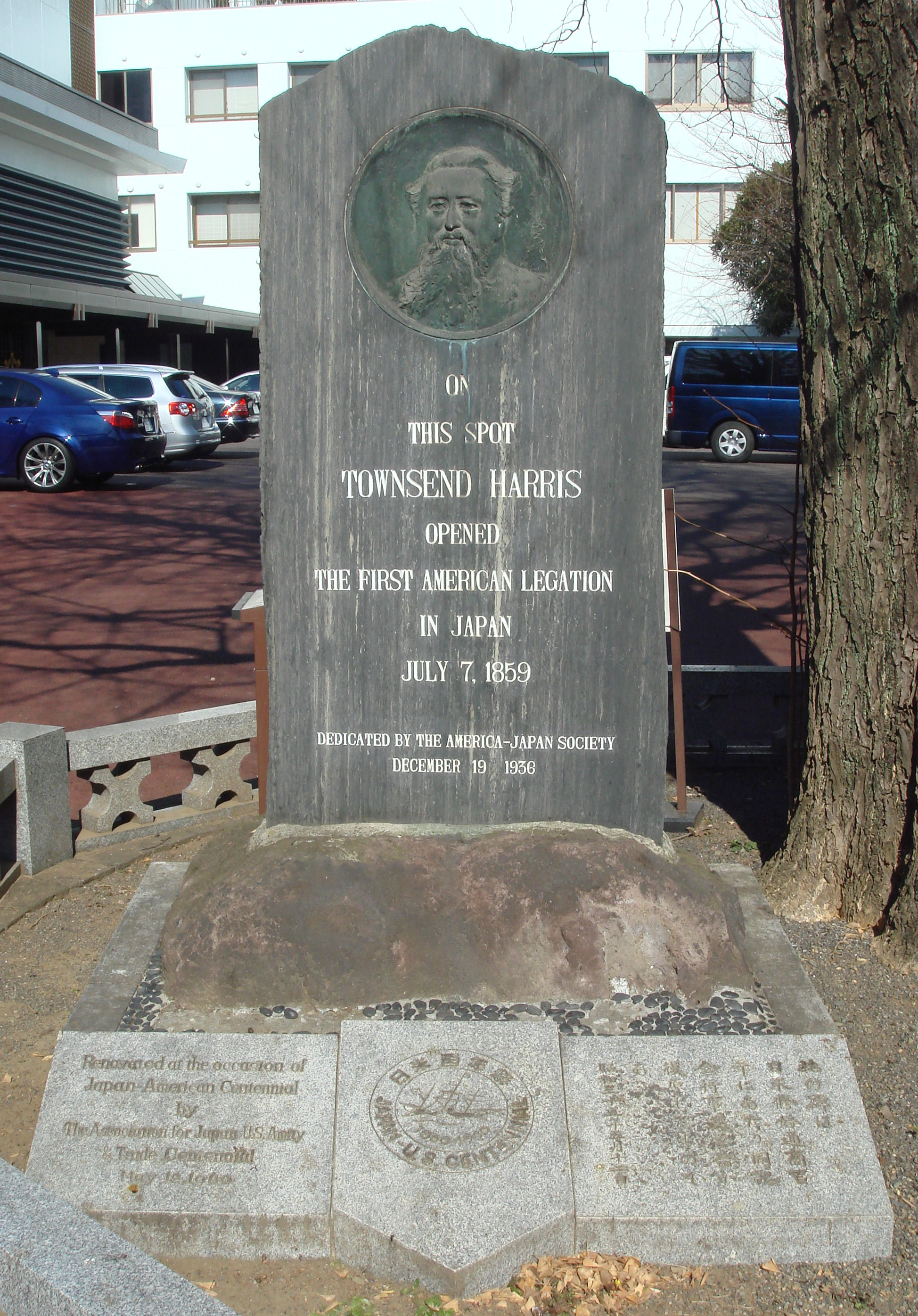
Townsend Harris monument in Zenpuku-ji

President Franklin Pierce named Harris the first Consul General to Tokugawa Japan in July 1856, where he opened the first US Consulate at the Gyokusen-ji Temple in the city of Shimoda, Shizuoka Prefecture, soon after Commodore Matthew Perry had first opened trade between the US and Japan in 1854. At that time, Japan was not a nation united under one leader, but was politically made up of jealous feudal principalities; the Shogunate ended in 1868, in part in response to Harris as envoy from the US since 1854, as William Elliot Griffis described the changes inside Japan after it opened itself to trade with the US and European nations.

Harris played an important political role in Japan in the 1850s and 1860s, alongside fellow Western diplomats Dirk de Graeff van Polsbroek, Max von Brandt, Rutherford Alcock and Gustave Duchesne, Prince de Bellecourt. Although these men were bound by personal friendship, national rivalries and differences in dealing with the Japanese led to conflict and antagonism. However, the chaotic and ungovernable circumstances of the first few years forced them to cooperate. Harris demanded the courtesies due to an accredited envoy and refused to deliver his president's letter to anyone but the Shogun in Edo, and to him personally. After prolonged negotiations lasting 18 months, Harris finally received a personal audience with the Shogun in the palace. After another four months, he successfully negotiated the Treaty of Amity and Commerce, or the "Harris Treaty of 1858", securing trade between the US and Japan and paving the way for greater Western influence in Japan's economy and politics. During treaty negotiations in June 1857, Harris requested the provision of teenage sex servants for himself and his translator. A 17 year-old named Tôjin Okichi was forced to have sex with Harris. Harris rejected her after three days because of a skin eruption on her back and demanded "cleaner" girls. Japanese officials provided him with two other teenagers in Spring and Summer 1858.

He served during the first Japanese Embassy to the United States, during which a false report of his death reached the US. Unfortunately he was addicted to alcohol and the complaints about his functioning led to his departure in 1861. Upon his departure, senior Japanese diplomat Moriyama wrote to him "You have been more than a friend. You have been our benefactor and teacher. Your spirit and memory will live forever in the history of Japan."

Harris was favorably impressed by his experiences in Japan at the end of its self-imposed period of isolation. He wrote:

"The people all appeared clean and well-fed... well clad and happy looking. It is more like the golden age of simplicity and honesty than I have ever seen in any other country".

== Return to the United States ==
Townsend returned to New York in 1861 after his eventful and successful period as envoy and ambassador to Japan. Author William Elliot Griffis had been in Japan from 1871 to 1874, invited to help modernize education there. Griffis met with Harris in New York in 1874. Harris asked of Griffis, "What do the Japanese think of me?" Griffis asked Townsend why he had not published his journals from those years. Griffis felt that Harris had not appreciated the extent of his favorable effect in Japan from his work in the five years as envoy, as Griffis later wrote in a 1919 article in The New York Times. Griffis obtained the journals from the niece of Harris in 1893, and had those journals published in 1895 by Houghton Mifflin Harcourt in New York, with additional biographical sketches and annotations. That book, Townsend Harris, First American Envoy in Japan, and translated into Japanese, was the basis for a play about Harris, written by Kido Okamoto and staged in Japan in 1919. The play was successful in Japan, reflecting how positively Harris was viewed in Japan. The actor playing Harris was made up to look like Harris, based on a photograph held in Tokyo.

Masao Miyoshi, born and educated in Japan and later a teacher in US universities, asserts in his book As We Saw Them: The First Japanese Embassy to the United States (1860) that the restrictive lifestyle for Townsend Harris as ambassador in Japan "had forever molded the opener of Japan into a hermit" for the rest of his life while in New York City.

== Death and legacy ==
Harris died in New York City on February 25, 1878, at age 73. He is buried in Green-Wood Cemetery in Brooklyn, New York.

In 1986, the nation of Japan presented a gift of a refurbished gravesite including paving stones, a stone lantern, a cherry tree, a dogwood tree, and two commemorative stones, in commemoration of the continuing respect and affection of the Japanese people for Harris.

== Portrayal in fiction ==
Harris was portrayed by John Wayne in the 1958 movie The Barbarian and the Geisha, directed by John Huston. Although the primary plot, dealing with Harris' attempt diplomatically to achieve détente between the U.S. and Japan, is essentially accurate, the subplot dealing with the love affair between Harris and Okichi is substantially fictional.

== See also ==
- Hotta Masayoshi
- List of Westerners who visited Japan before 1868
- Sakoku

== Bibliography ==
- Cosenza, Mario Emilio (1930), The Complete Journal of Townsend Harris, First American Consul General and Minister to Japan, New York: Doubleday, ISBN 978-1-4325-7244-0, "Reprinted by Kessinger Publishing Company, Whitefish, Montana, 2007"
- Dulles, Foster Rhea (1965), Yankees and Samurai: America's Role in the Emergence of Modern Japan, 1791–1900, New York: Harper & Row
- Griffis, William Elliot (1895), Townsend Harris, First American Envoy in Japan, New York: Houghton, Mifflin, and Company, ISBN 9781404729636 A full-text copy of this book.
- Perrin, Noel (1979), Giving up the gun, Boston: David R. Godine, ISBN 0-87923-773-2
