= George Jones (navy chaplain) =

United States Navy Chaplain

- Born: July 30, 1800; York, Pennsylvania, U.S.
- Died: January 22, 1870 (aged 69); Philadelphia, Pennsylvania, U.S.
- Military career
- Allegiance: United States of America
- Branch: United States Navy
- Service years: 1825 to 1828, 1832 to 1860
- Rank: Chaplain
- Units: USS Constitution, United States Naval Academy

The Reverend Prof. George Jones (July 30, 1800 – January 22, 1870) was a minister of the Episcopal Church, United States Navy chaplain, academic, and writer.

He is remembered as the first chaplain and head of English studies at the United States Naval Academy and for his participation in the landmark 1852–1854 expedition to Japan under the command of Commodore Matthew Perry.

== Background and early life ==
Jones was born on his family's estate near York, Pennsylvania, in 1800, the youngest son of Robert and Elizabeth Jones.

He was educated at Yale University, where he graduated as the 1823 class valedictorian. After two years teaching in Washington, D.C., he served as schoolmaster on board the Navy frigates USS Brandywine and USS Constitution and as secretary to Commodore Charles Morris. Jones was ordained deacon in the Episcopal Church in Hartford, Connecticut, on January 16, 1831, thereafter serving as a parish priest in Middletown, Connecticut.

Jones rejoined the U.S. Navy in 1832, first as an acting chaplain aboard the flagship of the Mediterranean fleet USS United States, receiving his commission as a chaplain in the U.S. Navy on April 20, 1833. In common with other shipboard chaplains of the era, Jones was responsible for the academic training of midshipmen in his charge. With a lifelong involvement in naval education, Jones made written recommendations to the Secretary of the Navy in 1839 to establish a more formalized officer training program. His appointment as the first head of English and chaplain of the newly opened Naval Academy at Annapolis in 1845 and 1851 respectively, was a recognition of his public advocacy on this topic.

== Perry Expedition to Japan ==
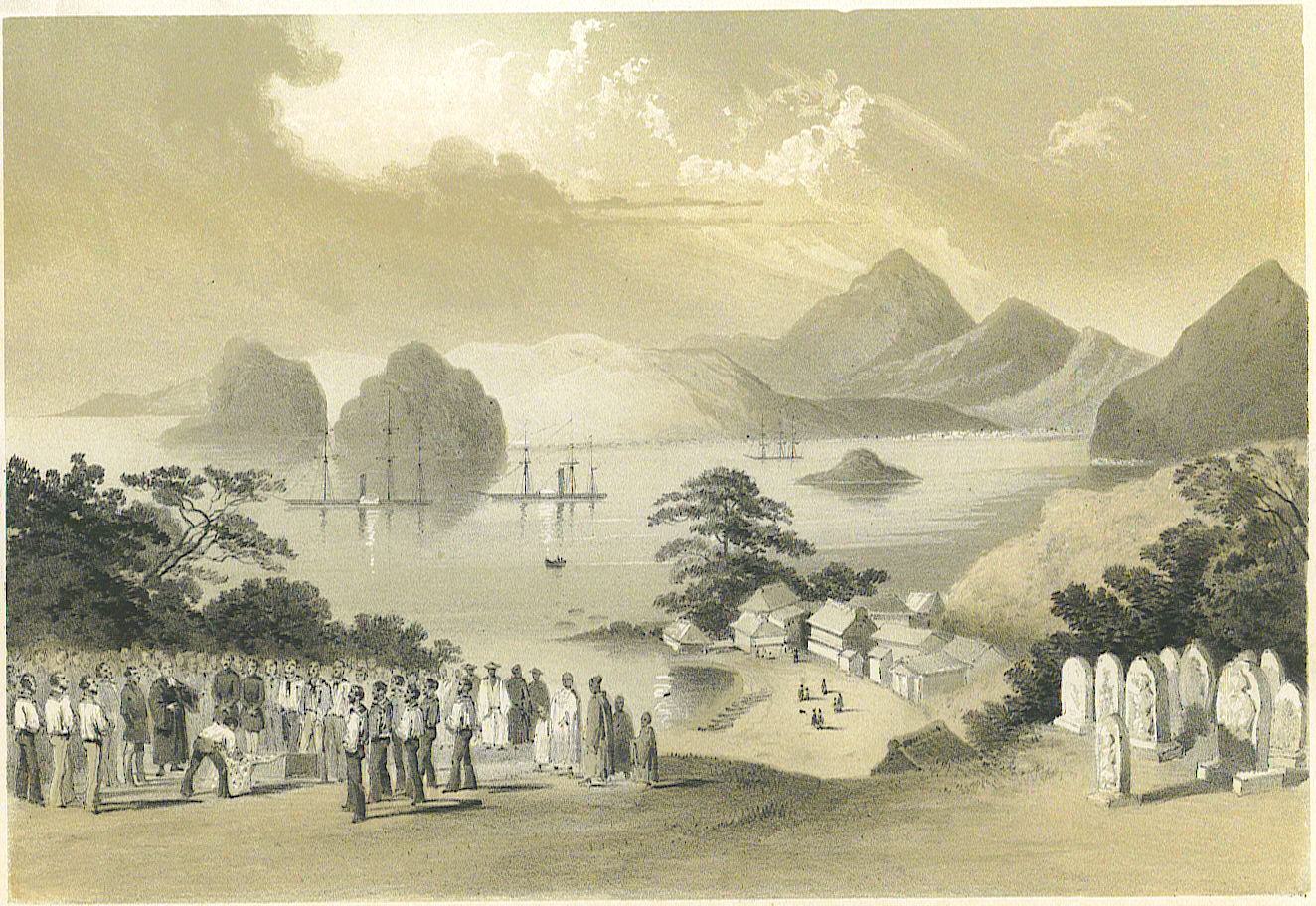
Foreign cemetery at Shimoda, Japan, 1854. Lithograph first published in 1856 by Wilhelm Heine

Jones was chosen by Commodore Perry to join as chaplain on his expedition to Japan, serving not only in a ministerial capacity but also as a chronicler of the expedition, amateur naturalist, and astronomer.

Departing Annapolis on the flagship USS Mississippi on November 18, 1852, Jones journeyed with the squadron for over two years. The squadron cleared Hampton Roads on November 24, heading first for Madeira, rounded the Cape of Good Hope, and continued to Hong Kong, Shanghai, and the Ryukyu Islands before entering Tokyo Bay on July 8, 1853.

Jones as chaplain kept the navy custom of holding divine service each Sunday while on board ship. According to the journal of Commodore Perry dated March 9, 1854, Jones was also able to conduct a Christian funeral on land at Yokohama "to the forms of the Episcopal Church." The funeral was for the interment of Private Robert Williams USMC, who had died on board the USS Mississippi. After many centuries of enforced isolation, this Christian ceremony was a significant event in terms of freedom of religious expression in Japan. In all, Jones was to conduct four more Christian burials during the fleet's stay in Japanese waters, one such funeral at Shimoda captured in sketch by the official expedition artist Wilhelm Heine.

Jones contributed extensively on astronomical observations of Zodiacal light to the third volume of Perry's published account of the expedition, Narrative of the Expedition of an American Squadron to the China Seas and Japan.

== Later years ==
Jones rejoined the teaching and chaplaincy staff of the Naval Academy on his return to the United States. He was stationed at the Philadelphia Naval Asylum at the time of his death January 22, 1870.

== Family ==
Jones married Mary Amelia Silliman of Brooklyn, New York, in 1837. She died in Washington, D.C., in 1865.

== Legacy ==
The Fellowship Hall at the Hope Chapel, United States Fleet Activities Yokosuka, Japan is dedicated in honor of Jones.
