= Timeline of Japan–United States relations =

Japanese–American relations

- Japan: United States

Diplomatic mission
- Embassy of Japan, Washington, D.C.: Embassy of the United States, Tokyo

Envoy
- Japanese Ambassador to the United States Shigeo Yamada (since 24 October 2023): United States Ambassador to Japan; Rahm Emanuel (since 25 March 2022)

Japan and the United States have held formal international relations since the mid-19th century. The first encounter between the two countries to be recorded in official documents occurred in 1791 when the Lady Washington became the first American ship to visit Japan in an unsuccessful attempt to sell sea otter pelts. In the 1850s, Japanese ports were opened to American trade for the first time after the Perry Expedition, led by naval officer Commodore Matthew C. Perry, arrived in Japan with a fleet of four Black Ships. In July 1856, Townsend Harris became the first American diplomat to Japan, and in 1858, the Treaty of Amity and Commerce, also known as the Harris Treaty, further expanded trade relations and established permanent consulates. The first Japanese Embassy to the United States set sail for San Francisco in 1860, marking diplomatic engagement between the two nations.

The early 20th century saw Japan and the United States become allies during World War I, and diplomatic interactions continued. However, tensions arose in the lead-up to World War II following the Japanese invasion of Manchuria, which ultimately resulted in Japan's attack on Pearl Harbor in 1941 and the United States' entry into the war. Following Japan's surrender in 1945, the relationship shifted towards a post-war partnership. Japan was occupied until 1952 when the Treaty of San Francisco came into effect. Japan–United States relations continued to evolve throughout the Cold War and into the 21st century, with periods of cooperation and occasional trade disputes. The two nations maintain strong economic ties, and Japan is a crucial ally of the United States in Asia.

== Pre-19th century ==
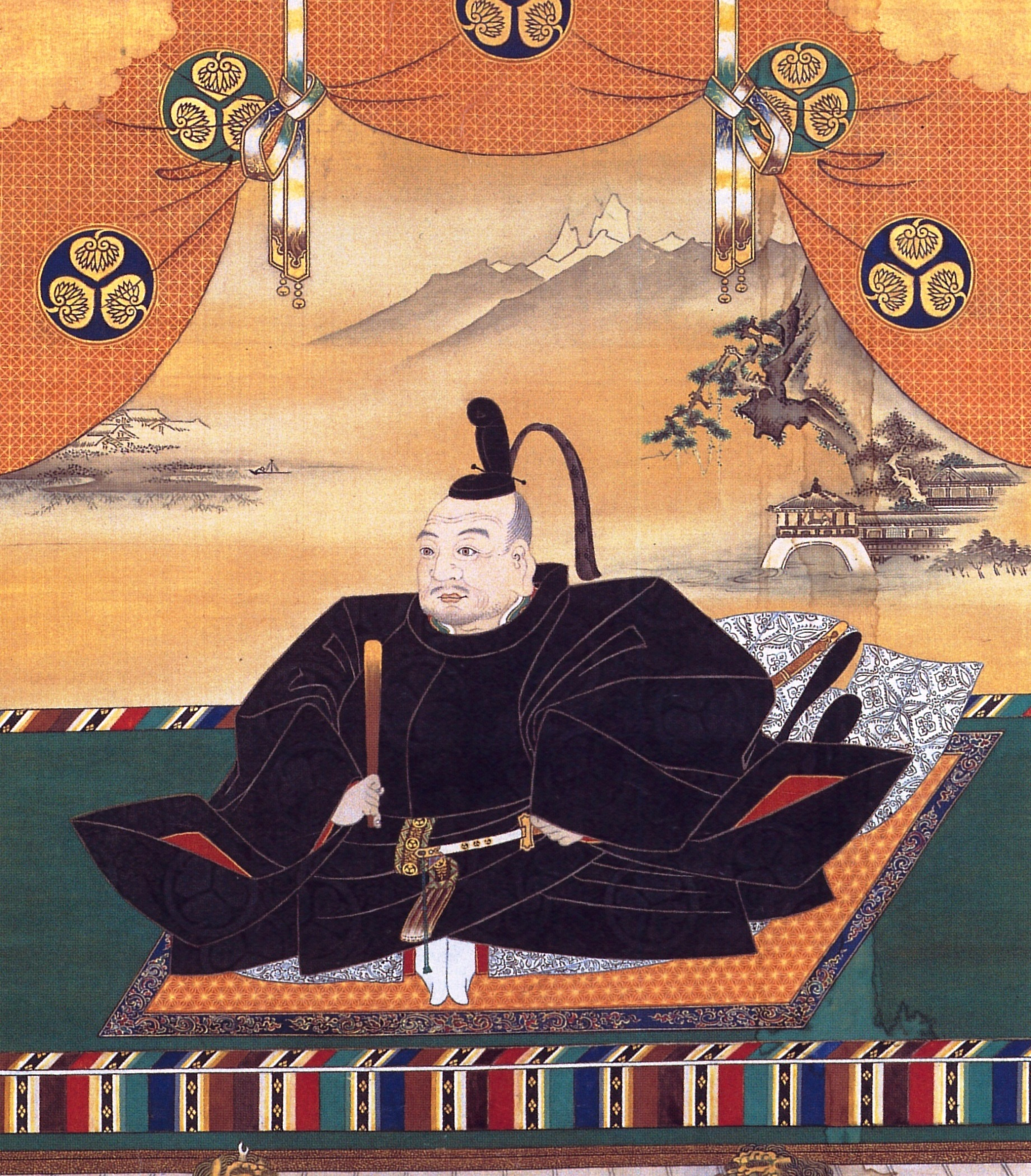
Tokugawa Ieyasu, the first shōgun of the Tokugawa shogunate

- October 21, 1600: In Japan, the forces of Tokugawa Ieyasu defeat a coalition of Toyotomi loyalist clans led by Ishida Mitsunari at the Battle of Sekigahara, ending the civil wars of the Sengoku period.
- March 24, 1603: Ieyasu receives the title of shōgun from Emperor Go-Yōzei and establishes the Tokugawa shogunate. The country enters a period known as the Edo period.
- 1633–1639: Sakoku, an isolationist foreign policy, is enacted in Japan through a series of policies and edicts. Under sakoku, relations between Japan and other countries are severely limited.
- July 4, 1776: The Continental Congress of the Thirteen Colonies adopt the Declaration of Independence, primarily drafted by Thomas Jefferson, which officially declares the colonies' separation from Great Britain. The United States of America is formed as an independent nation.
- 1791: The Lady Washington becomes the first American ship to visit Japan. John Kendrick, an American trader, stops both the Lady Washington and the Grace (captained by William Douglas) at Kii Ōshima in Kushimoto, Wakayama, in an unsuccessful attempt to sell sea otter pelts. The encounter becomes the first between Japan and the United States to be recorded in official documents.

== 19th century ==
- 1825: The shogunate issue the Edict to Repel Foreign Vessels, a law prohibiting contact with foreigners.
- June 12, 1836: Edmund Roberts, whom the American government has sent to become the United States' first envoy to Japan, dies in Portuguese Macau before he can reach the nation.
- 1837: Morrison, an American merchant ship headed by Charles W. King, is driven away from Japan by cannon fire. The event becomes known as the Morrison incident.
- January 1841: Fourteen-year-old fisherman Nakahama Manjirō and four of his friends are shipwrecked on Tori-shima in the Izu Islands. After being stranded there for six months, they are rescued by the American whaling ship John Howland, captained by William H. Whitfield. Whitfield takes the five castaways to Honolulu, Hawaii.
- 1843: While his companions remain in Honolulu, Manjirō travels on the John Howland to New Bedford, Massachusetts and becomes the first Japanese person to land on the mainland United States.
- July 20, 1846: James Biddle anchors two US Navy warships, the USS Columbus and the USS Vincennes, in Uraga Channel at the mouth to Edo Bay in another unsuccessful attempt to open up trade with Japan.
- July 1, 1848: Ranald MacDonald of Oregon Country comes ashore on Rishiri Island and pretends that he has been shipwrecked. He stays in Japan for ten months and becomes the first native English speaker to teach the English language in the nation.
- April 1849: MacDonald returns to the United States on board the American warship USS Preble.
- September 9, 1850: California is admitted as the 31st state to join the union.
- February 2, 1851: Manjirō and two of his fellow travelling companions return to Japan.

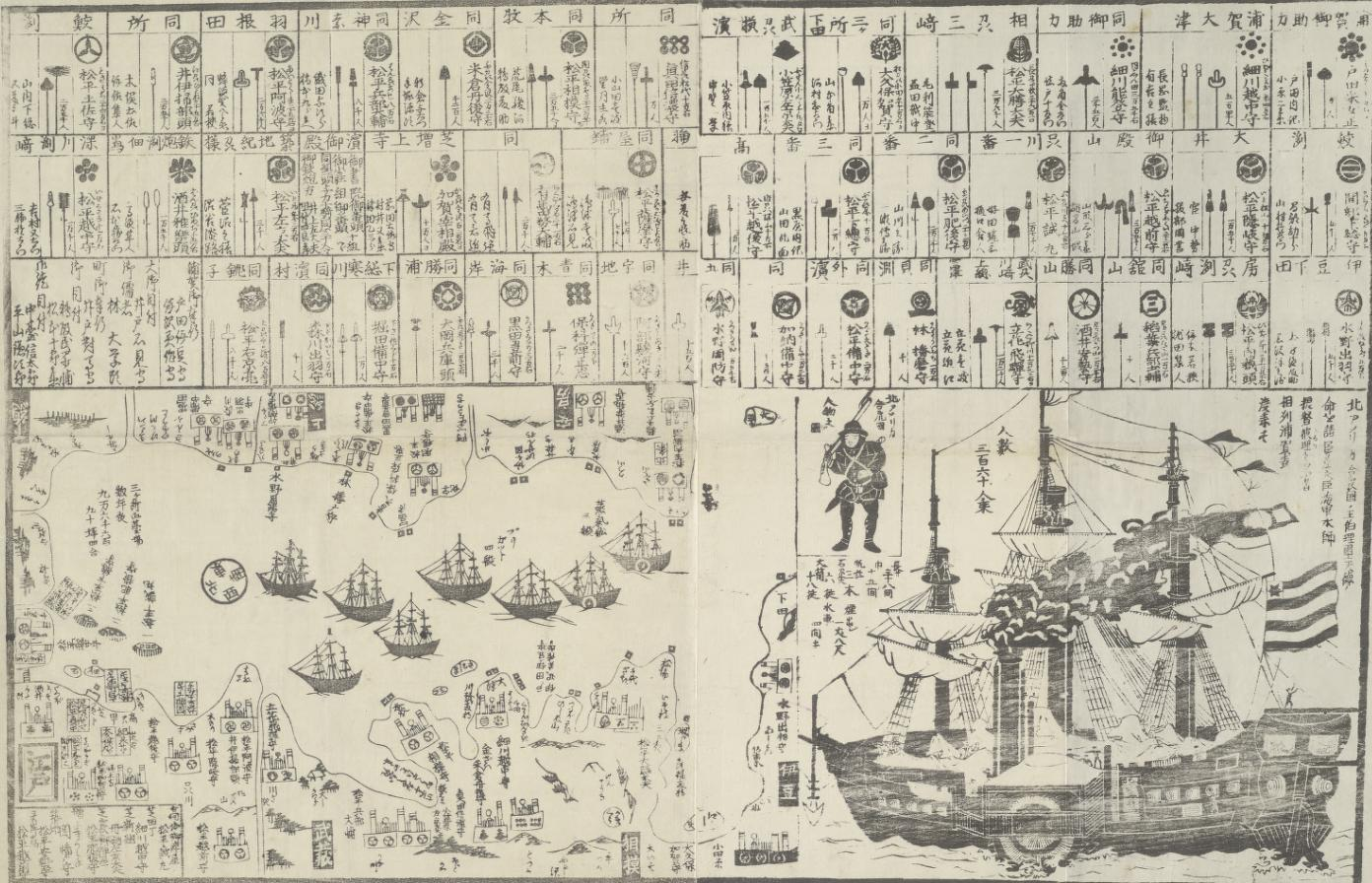
An 1854 Japanese print depicting the Perry Expedition

- 1853:
  - March 4: Franklin Pierce is inaugurated as the 14th president of the United States.
  - July 8: The Perry Expedition, led by naval officer Commodore Matthew C. Perry, arrives in Japan with a fleet of four Black Ships. Perry demands the opening of Japanese ports to American trade and presents a letter from President Millard Fillmore to Japan's emperor, Osahito, urging him to establish commercial and diplomatic relations with the United States.
- 1854:
  - February 14: Perry returns to Kanagawa with a fleet of eight warships.
  - March 31: The Convention of Kanagawa, the first treaty between the United States and Japan, is signed by Perry and the Tokugawa shogunate. The treaty opens up two Japanese ports, Shimoda and Hakodate, for trade to American ships.
- 1856:
  - July: Pierce names Townsend Harris as the first American diplomat to serve as Consul General to Japan.
  - August 21: Harris opens a temporary consulate general in the Gyokusen-ji temple in Kakizaki, Shimoda.
- March 4, 1857: James Buchanan is inaugurated as the 15th president of the United States.
- 1858:
  - June 6: In Baltimore, Joseph Heco (born Hikozō Hamada) becomes the first Japanese subject to become an American citizen.
  - July 29: On the deck of the USS Powhatan in Edo, Japan and the United States sign the Treaty of Amity and Commerce, also known as the Harris Treaty, opening up the ports of Kanagawa and four other Japanese cities to American trade and allowing the establishment of permanent consulates.
- 1859:
  - January 19: Harris is appointed as the first Minister Resident to Japan.
  - July: Harris opens the first American legation in Japan at the Zenpuku-ji temple in Azabu, Edo.

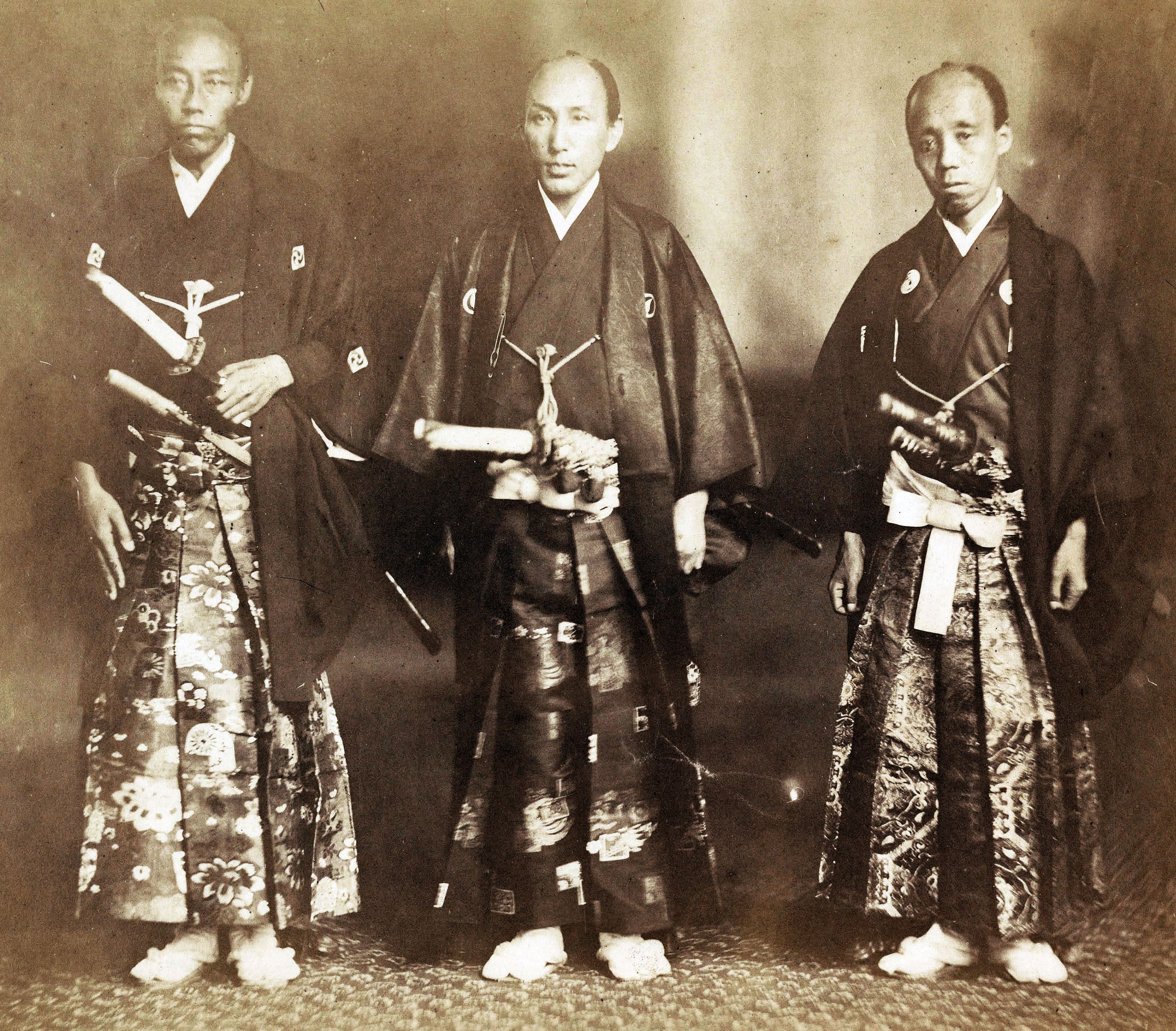
The first Japanese Embassy to the United States was led by Ambassador Muragaki Norimasa, Vice-Ambassador Shinmi Masaoki, and Observer Oguri Tadamasa (pictured).

- 1860:
  - January 19: The first Japanese Embassy to the United States, comprising 77 samurai (including Manjirō and educator Fukuzawa Yukichi), sets sail from Uraga for San Francisco to negotiate revised treaties and establish diplomatic ties.
  - March 24: The Sakuradamon Incident occurs: outside the Sakurada Gate of Edo Castle, Ii Naosuke, Chief Minister (Tairō) of the Tokugawa shogunate is assassinated by rōnin samurai of the Mito Domain and Satsuma Domain.
  - May: The embassy leaders meet with Buchanan at the White House.
  - November 6: The United States presidential election is won by Abraham Lincoln.
- 1861:
  - January 14: Henry Heusken, a Dutch-American interpreter for the American consulate, is assassinated by seven anti-foreign samurai from Satsuma Domain.
  - March 4: Lincoln is inaugurated as the 16th president of the United States.
  - April 12: The South Carolina militia bombard Fort Sumter near Charleston, South Carolina, beginning the American Civil War between the Northern states (Union) and the Southern states (Confederacy). During the war, the Japanese government maintains a policy of neutrality.
- September 12, 1862: The Namamugi Incident takes place: Charles Lennox Richardson, an English merchant, is killed by the armed retinue of Shimazu Hisamitsu, the regent of the Satsuma Domain, on a road at Namamugi, Yokohama. Two other English merchants are wounded.
- 1863:
  - July 20: The Shimonoseki campaign begins. Joint naval forces from Western nations (including the United States) intermittently fight the Chōshū Domain over control of the Shimonoseki Straits.
  - August 15: In retaliation for the Namamugi Incident the previous year, British warships fire on the capital of the Satsuma Domain, Kagoshima.
- 1864:
  - July 11: Sakuma Shōzan, a Japanese politician and scholar, is ambushed and assassinated in broad daylight by a hitokiri named Kawakami Gensai and a small group of assassins from the Higo and Oki clans.
  - September 8: Chōshū forces surrender to the Western powers, ending the Shimonoseki campaign.
  - Niijima Jō entreats Captain William T. Savory of Salem, Massachusetts for safe passage to the United States.

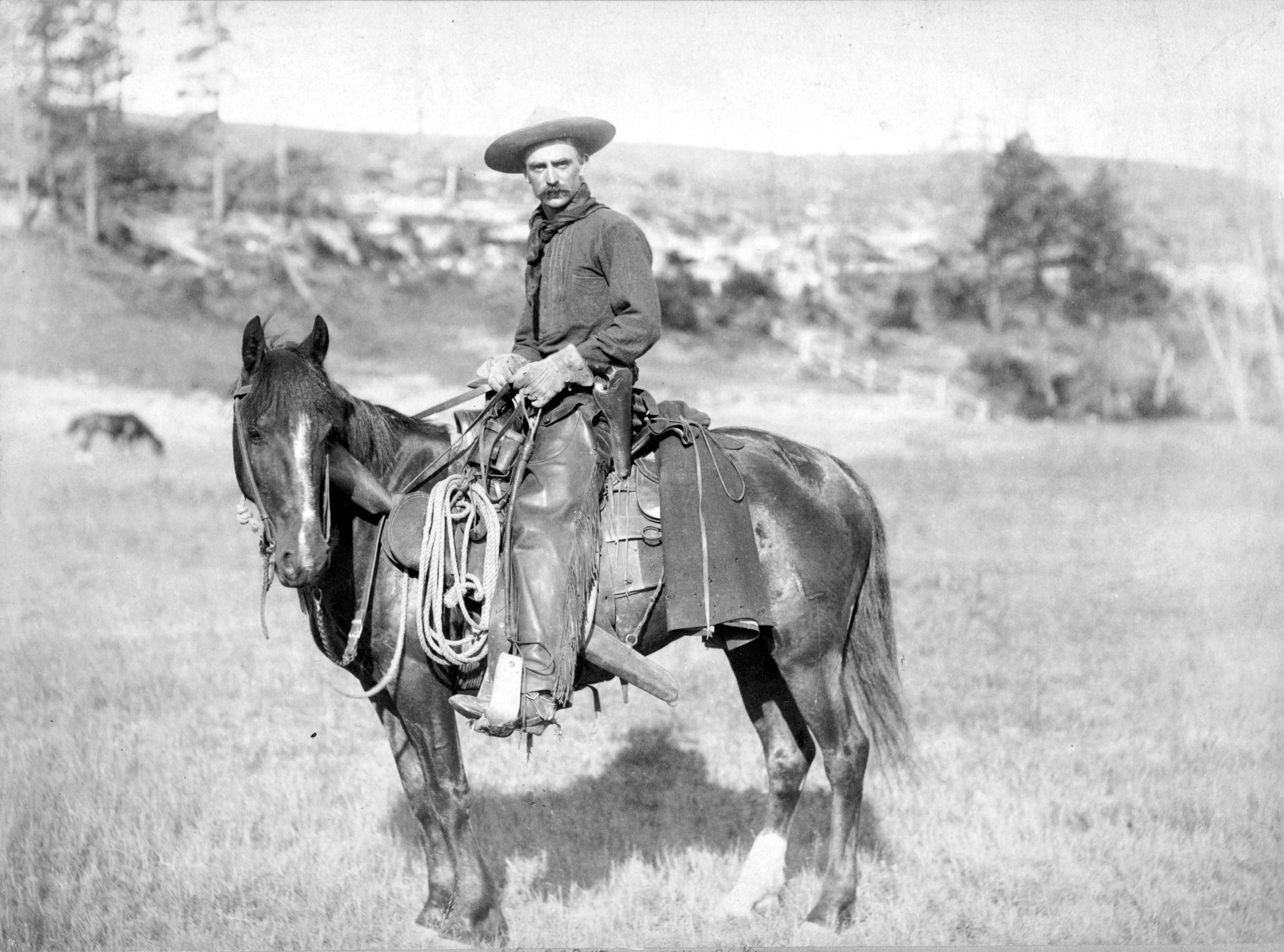
The cowboy, the quintessential symbol of the Old West

- 1865:
  - March 4: Lincoln is inaugurated for his second term as president.
  - April 9: Confederate General Robert E. Lee surrenders to Union General Ulysses S. Grant, effectively ending the Civil War and beginning the Reconstruction era and the archetypal Old West period.
  - April 14: At Ford's Theatre in Washington D.C., Lincoln is shot and mortally wounded by actor and Confederate sympathizer John Wilkes Booth.
  - April 15: Lincoln dies of his wounds at 7:22 a.m. His vice president, Andrew Johnson, is inaugurated as the 17th president of the United States at 11 a.m.
  - Niijima begins attending Phillips Academy in Andover, Massachusetts under the name Joseph Hardy Neesima.
- 1866:
  - January 18: Johnson appoints Robert B. Van Valkenburgh as Minister Resident to Japan.
  - Fukuzawa begins publishing Seiyō Jijō (西洋事情, Things western), a ten-volume series of books describing Western institutions and culture.
- 1867:
  - January 30: Osahito dies. His son Mutsuhito accedes to the throne.
  - October 18: Following the acquisition of Alaska from the Russian Empire, the area is formally transferred to the United States.
  - November 9: Tokugawa Yoshinobu, the 15th and last shōgun of the Tokugawa shogunate, tenders his resignation to Mutsuhito.
  - November: Mori Arinori and samurai students from the Satsuma Domain travel to New York.
  - December 10: At the Ōmiya Inn in Kyoto, samurai Sakamoto Ryōma is assassinated. The event is known as the Ōmiya Incident.
- 1868:
  - January 3: Mutsuhito strips Yoshinobu of his power and formally restores his own, beginning a period known as the Meiji Restoration and establishing the Empire of Japan.
  - January 27: At the Battle of Toba–Fushimi, forces of the Tokugawa shogunate attack allied pro-imperial forces, beginning a civil war in Japan known as the Boshin War.
  - April 6: The Charter Oath is issued, laying out Mutsuhito's ambitions for Japan to modernize and industrialize.
  - May: Dutch American merchant Eugene Miller Van Reed organizes a group of 148 Japanese laborers known as the Gannenmono to work in Hawaii. The native population mistreats the laborers, resulting in a freeze on immigration from Japan.
  - September: Mutsuhito announces that Edo is to be renamed Tokyo, meaning "eastern capital".
  - October 23: The Japanese era name is changed to Meiji, and a "one reign, one era name" (一世一元, issei-ichigen) system is adopted, whereby era names only change upon immediate imperial succession.
  - November 3: The United States presidential election is won by Grant.
- 1869:
  - March 4: Grant is inaugurated as the 18th president of the United States.
  - April: Charles E. DeLong and his family arrive in Japan as minister resident to the country.
  - May 10: The first transcontinental railroad in the United States opens for through traffic between Sacramento, California and Omaha, Nebraska.
  - May 20: Fleeing the Boshin War, twenty-two people from samurai families in Aizu-Wakamatsu arrive in San Francisco.
  - June 8: The colonists arrive in Gold Hill, California, and set up the Wakamatsu Tea and Silk Farm Colony on 200 acres of land purchased from Charles Graner. The colony is the first permanent Japanese settlement in North America and the only settlement by samurai outside of Japan.
  - June 27: The fortress of Goryōkaku is turned over to Imperial Japanese forces, ending the Boshin War.
- 1870:
  - May/June: Neesima graduates from Amherst College in Amherst, Massachusetts. In doing so, he becomes the first Japanese person to receive a bachelor's degree.
  - October: Mori is appointed as the first ambassador of Japan to the United States.
- 1871:
  - February: Mori arrives in Washington D.C. to begin his tenure as ambassador.
  - August 19: In the city of Yedo, Japan signs the Treaty of Amity and Commerce with the Kingdom of Hawaii.
  - August 29: The leaders of the Satsuma and Chōshū Domains abolish the han system. Mutsuhito establishes the modern prefectures of Japan in its place.
  - December 23: The Iwakura Mission, a Japanese diplomatic voyage to the United States and Europe, sets sail from Yokohama on the SS America.
- 1872: The Iwakura Mission arrives in San Francisco on January 15, then travels to Salt Lake City, Chicago, and Washington D.C. on February 29.
- 1873:
  - January 10: Japan establishes the Conscription Law, introducing compulsory military service for all men in their twenties.
  - March 4: Grant is inaugurated for his second term as president.
  - May 31: Grant appoints John Bingham as minister resident to Japan.
  - September 13: The Iwakura Mission arrives back in Japan, landing in Yokohama.
  - October: Bingham arrives in Japan.
- 1874:
  - February 1: The Meirokusha society is formed in Tokyo by Mori, Fukuzawa, and others.
  - Neesima returns to Japan.
- 1875:
  - To advance Christian education in Japan, Neesima founds Doshisha Eigakko in Kyoto.
  - Fukuzawa publishes Bunmeiron no Gairyaku (文明論之概略, An Outline of a Theory of Civilization).
- 1876:
  - May 10 – November 10: At the Centennial Exposition in Philadelphia, the Japanese government exhibits a Japanese-style "dwelling" and a bazaar.
  - William Elliot Griffis publishes The Mikado's Empire.

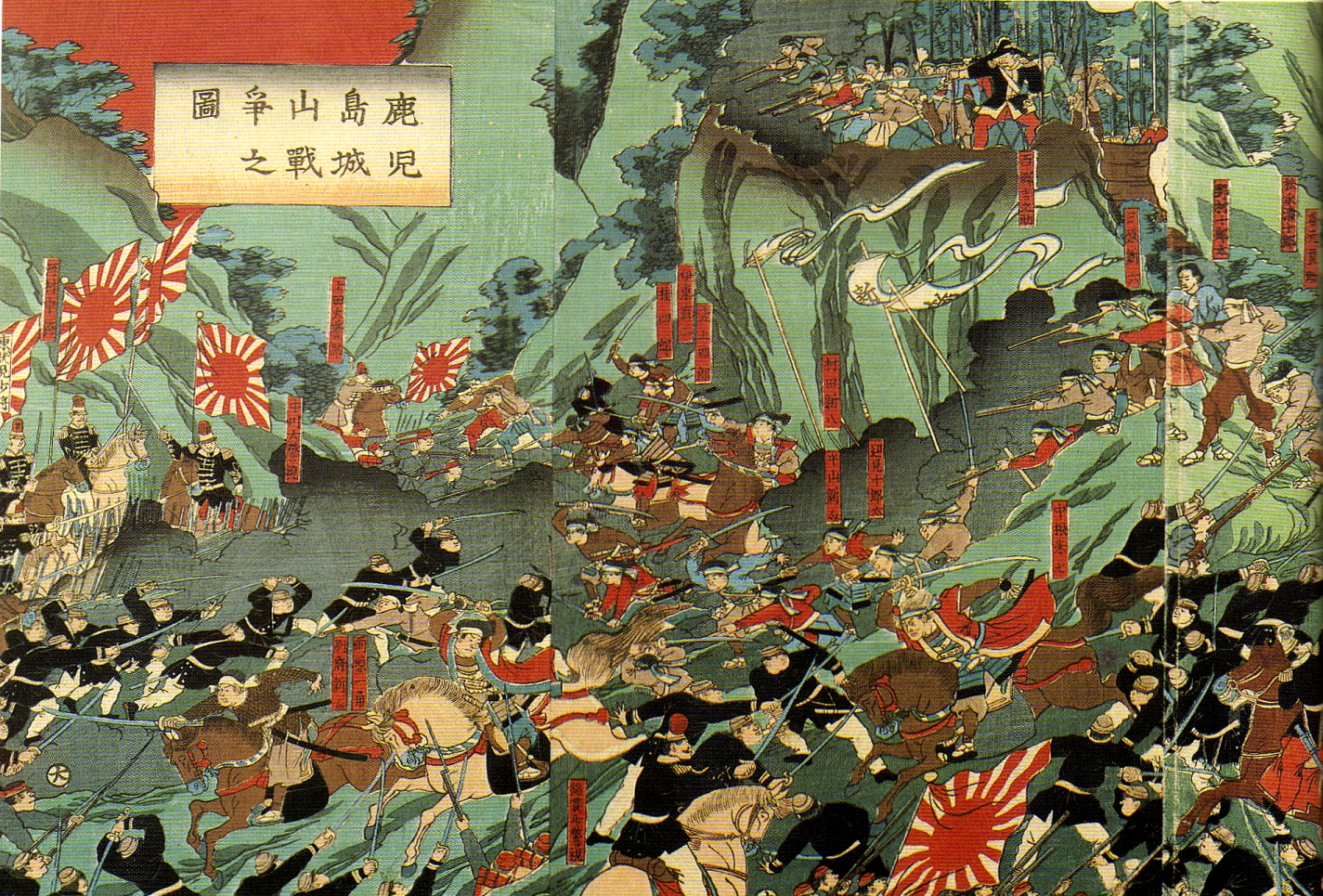
The defeat at the Battle of Shiroyama in 1877 effectively ended the samurai class.

- 1877:
  - January 29: The Satsuma Rebellion, a protest against Japan's rapid modernization and the new imperial government led by Saigō Takamori, erupts.
  - March 4: Rutherford B. Hayes is inaugurated as the 19th president of the United States.
  - September 24: The Battle of Shiroyama, the final battle of the rebellion, ends in imperial victory, suppressing the Satsuma Rebellion and effectively ending the samurai class.
- 1889:
  - February 11: The Meiji Constitution is proclaimed.
  - May 1: Japan's capital is officially established in Tokyo City.
- 1890:
  - Following the United States census, the Census Bureau announce that settlement in the American West has reached sufficient population density that the American frontier no longer exists and the region is closed.
  - Minister to Japan John Franklin Swift agrees with the Japanese government to lease buildings and land in Akasaka, Tokyo. Swift moves the American legation to this new location.
- August 1, 1894: War is declared between Japan and the Qing Empire of China over their rival claims of influence on the Joseon dynasty of Korea, marking the start of the First Sino-Japanese War. The United States supports Japan during the war, recognizing Japan's growing regional influence.
- April 17, 1895: At the Shunpanrō hotel in Shimonoseki, Japan and China sign the Treaty of Shimonoseki, ending the war.

== 20th century ==
- February 15, 1907: To reduce tensions between the two nations, Japan and the United States reach an informal Gentlemen's Agreement addressing Japanese immigration to the United States.
- August 22, 1910: Under the Treaty of 1910, the Japan formally annexes Korea.
- 1912:
  - February 14: Arizona is admitted as the 48th state to join the union.
  - July 30: Mutsuhito dies. His son Yoshihito accedes to the throne.
- August 23, 1914: Japan enters into World War I as a member of the Allies.
- April 6, 1917: The United States enters World War I by declaring war on the German Empire.
- November 11, 1918: At the Forest of Compiègne, the Allies sign an Armistice with Germany, ending the fighting in the war.
- February 6, 1922: In Washington D.C., the Washington Naval Treaty is signed by the United States, Japan and the remaining Allies of World War I.
- May 26, 1924: The Immigration Act of 1924 is enacted. The act prevents immigration from Asian countries, including Japan, into the United States.
- December 25, 1926: Yoshihito dies. His son Hirohito accedes to the throne.
- 1929: In California, the Japanese American Citizens League is founded.
- April 22, 1930: In London, the Allies sign the London Naval Treaty.
- September 18, 1931: The Empire of Japan's Kwantung Army invades Manchuria, immediately following the Mukden Incident. The United States objects to Japan's invasion and subsequent occupation of China, beginning tensions between the two countries.
- June 6, 1932: Joseph Grew takes up the post of ambassador of the United States to Japan.
- January 15, 1936: Japanese delegates withdraw from the Second London Naval Conference.
- September 1, 1939: World War II begins in Europe, as Nazi Germany invades Poland.
- 1940:
  - July 5: The United States Congress passes the Export Control Act, imposing restrictions on the export of critical resources, including oil and steel, to Japan.
  - September 17: The Tripartite Pact—primarily directed at the United States—is signed by Japan, Germany and Italy.
- 1941:
  - February 12: Negotiations begin between the United States and Japan.
  - July 26: President Franklin D. Roosevelt freezes all Japanese assets in the United States.
  - November 26: The Hull note—a final proposal from the United States that includes demands for Japan to withdraw from China—is delivered to the Empire of Japan.
  - December 7: The Imperial Japanese Navy Air Service launches a surprise attack on the American naval base at Pearl Harbor in Honolulu. The Empire of Japan declares war on the United States and the British Empire 7½ hours later.
- 1942:
  - February 19: Roosevelt signs the presidential Executive Order 9066, authorizing the removal of Japanese Americans from the West Coast of the United States.
  - The Empire of Japan reaches its greatest extension, encompassing territories spanning over 7,400,000 square kilometers.
  - June 4–7: The United States Pacific Fleet defeats the Imperial Japanese Navy in the Battle of Midway, shifting the momentum in favor of the Allies in the Pacific War.
  - November 27, 1943: The United States, China and the United Kingdom issue the Cairo Declaration, stating that Japan must surrender unconditionally and return all territories acquired by force.

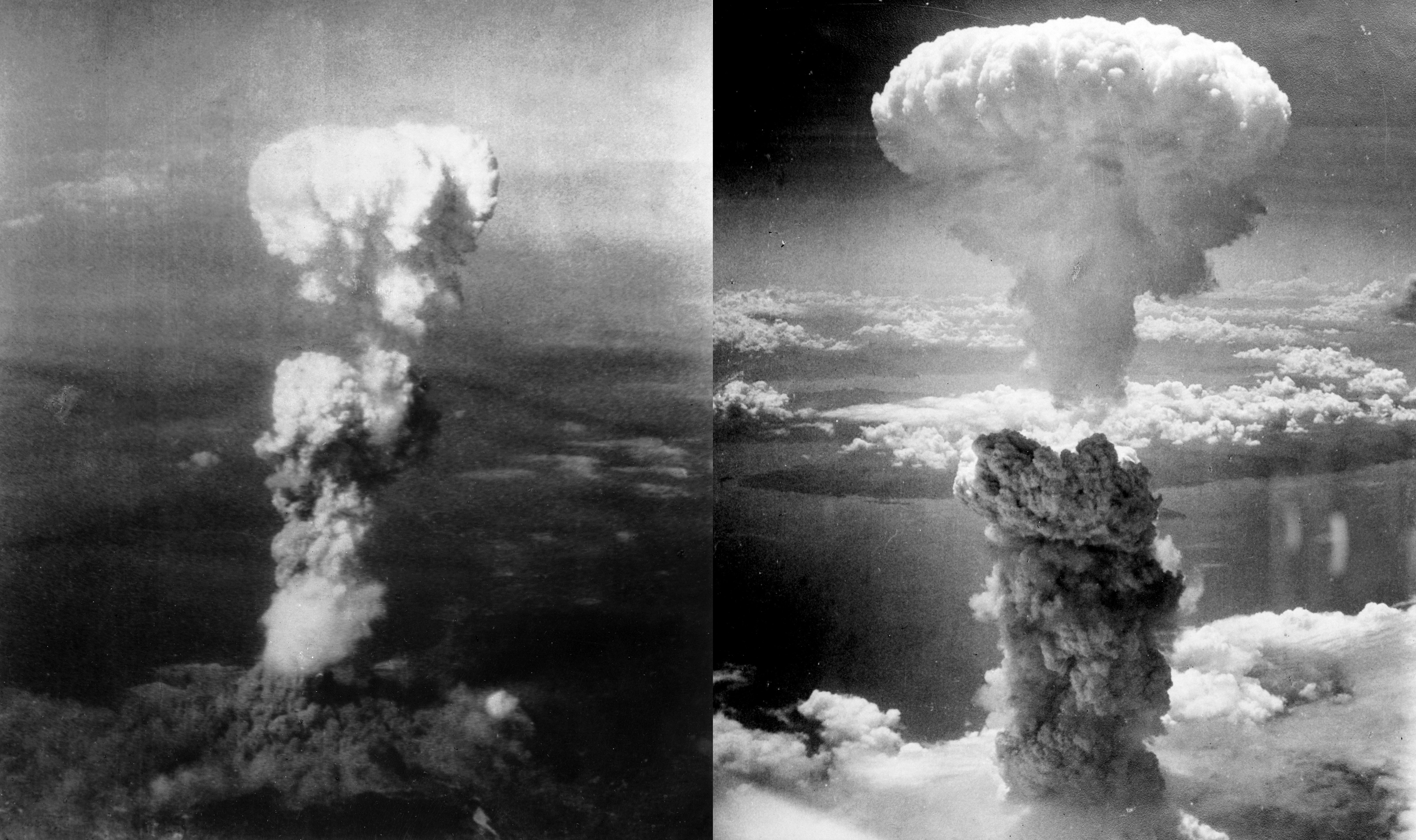
Atomic bomb mushroom clouds over Hiroshima (left) and Nagasaki (right)

- 1945:
  - July 26: The leaders of the United States, the UK and China issue the Potsdam Declaration, outlining Japan's terms of surrender in the war. The document warns that Japan will face "prompt and utter destruction" if it does not surrender.
  - August 6: The United States Army Air Forces (USAAF) detonates an atomic bomb, "Little Boy" over the Japanese city of Hiroshima at 8:15 a.m. local time, resulting in between 90,000 and 146,000 deaths.
  - August 9: The USAAF detonates another atomic bomb, "Fat Man", over the Japanese city of Nagasaki at 11:02 a.m. local time, resulting in between 39,000 and 80,000 deaths.
  - August 15: In a radio broadcast, Hirohito announces the unconditional surrender of Japan.
  - September 2: The Japanese Instrument of Surrender is formally signed by representatives of the Empire of Japan aboard the United States Navy battleship USS Missouri in Tokyo Bay, officially ending the hostilities of World War II. The Allies begin an occupation of Japan.
- May 3, 1947: The reformed Constitution of Japan comes into effect, dissolving the Empire of Japan.
- September 8, 1951: The Treaty of San Francisco and the Security Treaty between the United States and Japan are signed in San Francisco, marking the beginning of the San Francisco System.
- April 28, 1952: The Treaty of San Francisco comes into effect, ending the Allied occupation of Japan. The United States maintains control of several islands, including Okinawa Prefecture, for military use.
- July 1, 1957: United States Forces Japan, a subordinate unified command of the United States Indo-Pacific Command, is activated at Fuchū Air Station in Tokyo.
- 1959–1960: The Anpo protests, a series of protests and demonstrations in Japan against the Security Treaty, erupt.
- August 21, 1959: Hawaii becomes, as of 2023, the most recent state to join the union.
- January 19, 1960: The U.S.–Japan Status of Forces Agreement and the Treaty of Mutual Cooperation and Security between the United States and Japan are signed in Washington, D.C.
- June 17, 1971: The Okinawa Reversion Agreement, which returns administrative control of Okinawa to Japan, is signed simultaneously in Tokyo and Washington D.C.
- November 1982: In Marysville, Ohio, the Japanese car firm Honda opens its first plant in the United States.
- September 22, 1985: The Plaza Accord—a joint-agreement between the United States, Japan and other major economies—is signed at the Plaza Hotel in New York City. The accord agrees to depreciate the United States dollar in relation to the Japanese yen, the French franc, the German Deutsche Mark and the British pound sterling by intervening in currency markets.
- January 7, 1989: Hirohito dies. His son Akihito accedes to the throne.
- 1991: Japan provides US$4 billion of funding to US efforts in the Gulf War, but does not send troops.
- 1995:
  - February: The Nye Initiative, a report on the United States security strategy toward East Asia and the Pacific area, is published.
  - September 4: Three US servicemen abduct and rape a 12-year-old girl in Okinawa.
  - October 21: In Ginowan, Okinawa, approximately 85,000 residents protest the incident and the continuing presence of US forces in the prefecture.

== 21st century ==
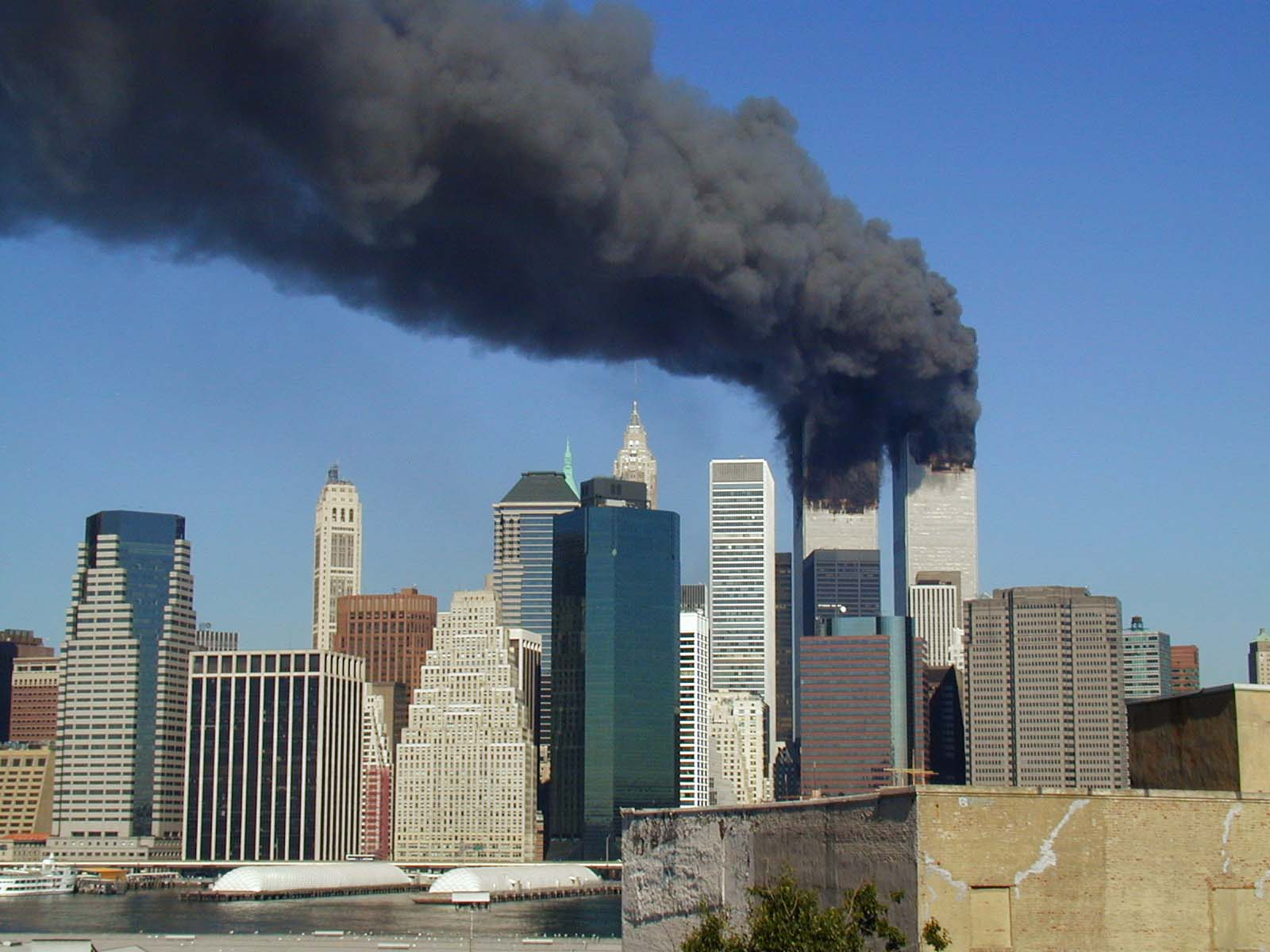
The World Trade Center following the September 11 attacks

- September 11, 2001: Militant organization al-Qaeda carries out four coordinated Islamist suicide terrorist attacks against the United States, killing almost 3,000 people. Japanese Prime Minister Junichiro Koizumi expresses "great anger" at the attacks, and orders special security precautions at all US military installations.
- 2003:
  - March 20: A US-led coalition of countries invades the Republic of Iraq.
  - July 25: Japan's parliament, the National Diet, approves dispatching Japanese troops to support the United States in Iraq.
- 2004:
  - February 3: The Japanese Iraq Reconstruction and Support Group, a contingent of Japan Self-Defense Forces, is deployed in southern Iraq to support reconstruction efforts.
  - December 9: Koizumi announces that Japanese troops will be kept in Iraq for another year.
- February 21, 2006: Amid a shortage, Japan agrees to end its 56-year ban on importing fresh potatoes from the United States.
- 2007: Japanese Prime Minister Shinzo Abe proposes the Quadrilateral Security Dialogue, a strategic security dialogue between Japan, the United States, Australia and India.
- March 11, 2011: At 14:46 JST (05:46 UTC), an undersea megathrust earthquake occurs in the Pacific Ocean, 72 km (45 mi) east of the Oshika Peninsula of the Tōhoku region, causing a tsunami. The earthquake and subsequent tsunami cause almost 20,000 deaths. US President Barack Obama offers his condolences and says that the United States will "stand with [Japan] as they recover and rebuild from this tragedy".
- December 2013: Japan approves moving the American military base in Okinawa to a less densely populated area of the island.
