= Frederick Strange (disambiguation) =

Frederick Strange (died 1854) was an English settler in South Australia and a collector of botanical specimens.

Frederick Strange may also refer to:

- Frederick Strange (painter) (c. 1807–1873), English convict in Van Diemen's Land, active as a painter
- Frederick William Strange (1844–1897), English-born Canadian physician, surgeon and politician
- Frederick William Strange (rower) (1853–1889), English-born competitive rower in Meiji Japan
