= Shinjirō =

- Gender: Male

Origin
- Origin: Japanese
- Meaning: Different meanings depending on the kanji used

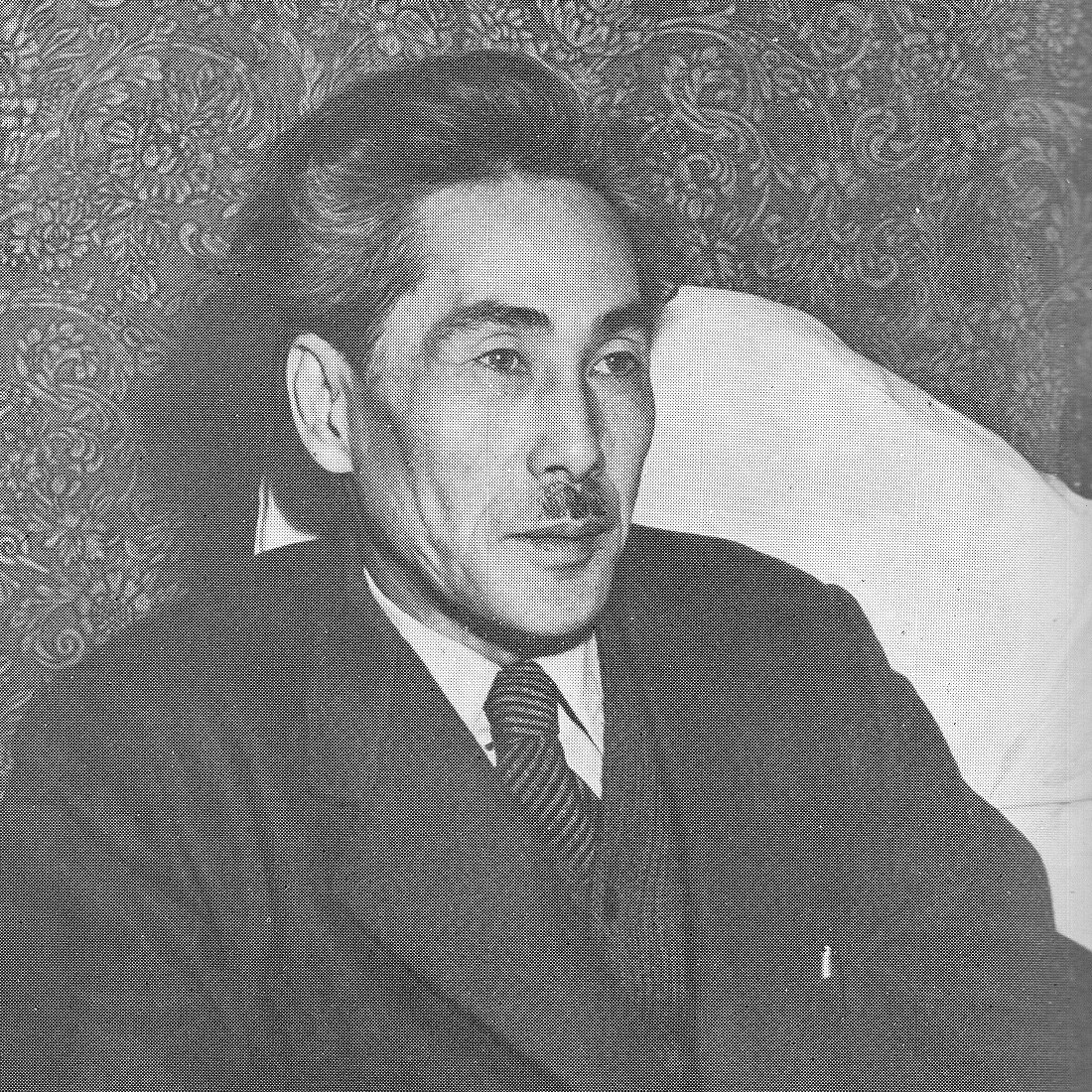
A portrait of Shinjiro Kurahara from an anthology of contemporary Japanese poets

Shinjirō, Shinjiro or Shinjirou (written: 進次郎, 新次郎, 晋二郎, 真二郎, 真司郎 or 伸次郎) is a masculine Japanese given name. Notable people with the name include:

- Shinjiro Atae (與 真司郎; born 1988), Japanese singer and actor
- Shinjirō Ehara (江原 真二郎; born 1936), Japanese actor
- Shinjiro Hiyama (桧山 進次郎; born 1969), Japanese baseball player
- Shinjirō Koizumi (小泉 進次郎; born 1981), Japanese politician
- Shinjiro Ono (小野 新次郎), Japanese government official and diplomat
- Shinjiro Otani (大谷 晋二郎; born 1972), Japanese professional wrestler
- Shinjiro Yamamoto (山本 信次郎; born 1877), Catholic Imperial Japanese Navy admiral

== Fictional characters ==
- Shinjiro Aragaki, a main character in Persona 3
