= Shinjiro Yamamoto =

Japanese admiral

- 山本信次郎
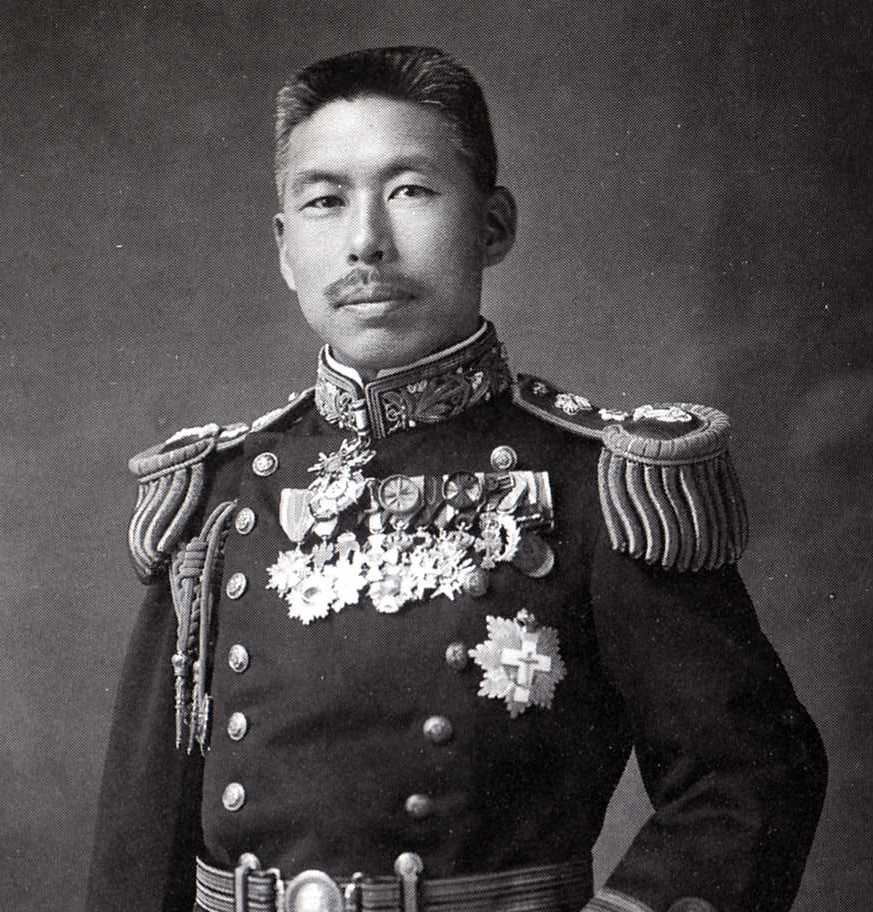
- Born: December 22, 1877; Katase, Kanagawa Prefecture, Japan
- Died: February 28, 1942 (aged 64); Tokyo, Japan
- Burial place: Aoyama Cemetery, Tokyo
- Alma mater: Imperial Japanese Naval Academy Naval War College
- Spouse: Shiyoko Yoshimara (died 1929)
- Military career
- Allegiance: Empire of Japan
- Branch: Imperial Japanese Navy
- Service years: 1898–1924
- Rank: Rear Admiral
- Conflicts: Boxer Rebellion; Siege of Tianjin; Russo-Japanese War; Siege of Port Arthur; Battle of Tsushima; World War I
- Awards: Order of the Golden Kite; Order of the Rising Sun, 3rd Class; Order of Saint Stanislaus, 3rd Class; Order of Leopold, 3rd Class; Knight of Order of St. Gregory the Great

Shinjiro Yamamoto (山本信次郎; 22 December 1877 – 28 February 1942) was an admiral in the Imperial Japanese Navy. He is known for being one of the highest ranking Catholic officials in the Imperial Japanese Armed Forces, and for his missionary work in the Japanese-controlled South Seas Mandate, now Palau, the Northern Mariana Islands, the Federated States of Micronesia, and the Marshall Islands. He was also made a Knight of Malta in 1936.

== Personal life ==
His father was Shōtarō Yamamoto, who died in 1923.

He was married to Shiyoko Yoshimara (born 1884, died 1929), a fellow catholic and daughter of a wealthy banker. Together they had three sons and two daughters. One of his sons, Hitoshi, died in battle in Nomonhan in 1939, during the Battle of Khalkhin Gol. His daughter, Takeko, became a catholic nun. He had one adoptive daughter, Mume (born 1891).

Yamamoto made a pilgrimage to the Holy Land in 1938. He was also a knight of the Sovereign Military Order of Malta. He was a close acquaintance to French diplomat and poet Paul Claudel.

== Biography ==
Yamamoto was born in Katase (now part of Fujisawa), Kanagawa Prefecture, Japan on the 22nd of December, 1877 (year 10 of the Meiji Era). He attended a grammar school in Katase, before entering the Gyosei boarding school in Tokyo at age 14, where he learnt French and English. His father, a counselor at a Buddhist temple, initially opposed his conversion to Christianity but later granted permission in 1893. He was baptized later that year on December 24, 1893 by Father Alphonse Henrique, taking the Christian name Stephano.

He entered the Imperial Japanese Naval Academy in 1895, at the age of 17. He graduated with honors in 1900. He met Pope Leo XIII in 1902, Pope Pius X in 1908, Pope Benedict XV thrice in 1917, 1919, and 1921, and Pope Pius XI in 1932. The circumstances of the third meeting with Pope Benedict XV had Yamamoto accompany then Crown Prince Hirohito as a translator and French instructor.

Yamamoto served in the Boxer Rebellion, where he was most notably stationed aboard the cruiser Kasagi as an interpreter due to his proficiency in English and French. During the Russo-Japanese War, he served under Admiral Tōgō Heihachirō. He was present during the Siege of Port Arthur and captained the IJN Mikasa during the Battle of the Tsushima Straits. He received the surrender of the Russian Admiral Nikolai Nebogatov. In 1909, he graduated from the Naval War College, then being assigned as an aide-de-camp to Admiral Tōgō.

Following the outbreak of the First World War, Yamamoto became naval attaché to the Japanese Embassy in Rome. He was appointed as a representative to the signing of the Versailles Peace Treaty by Saionji Kinmochi. Japan received the South Seas Mandate for the nation's contributions in the war, in where Yamamoto had supported Catholic missions to the Micronesian islands, specifically requesting so from the Pope, who agreed to send 20 Spanish Jesuit missionaries.

In 1938, as an official envoy sent by Pope Pius XI to Brazil, he bestowed the medal of Saint Gregory the Great to Catholic missionary and priest Domingos Chohachi Nakamura for his missionary work in both Japan and Brazil.

He died on the 28th of February, 1942, in Shinjuku, Tokyo, Japan, just under three months after the Attack on Pearl Harbour and the escalation of the Pacific War, due to complications with cerebral arteriosclerosis. He was remembered by Tanaka Kōtarō, another Japanese Catholic whom he referred to as a 'monk in military uniform'.

In 1944, at least 13 of these missionaries were tortured and executed by the Imperial Japanese Army under suspicion of being spies, and buried in unmarked mass graves on Saipan, Yap, and Tobi, now part of the Marianas, Micronesia, and Palau respectively.

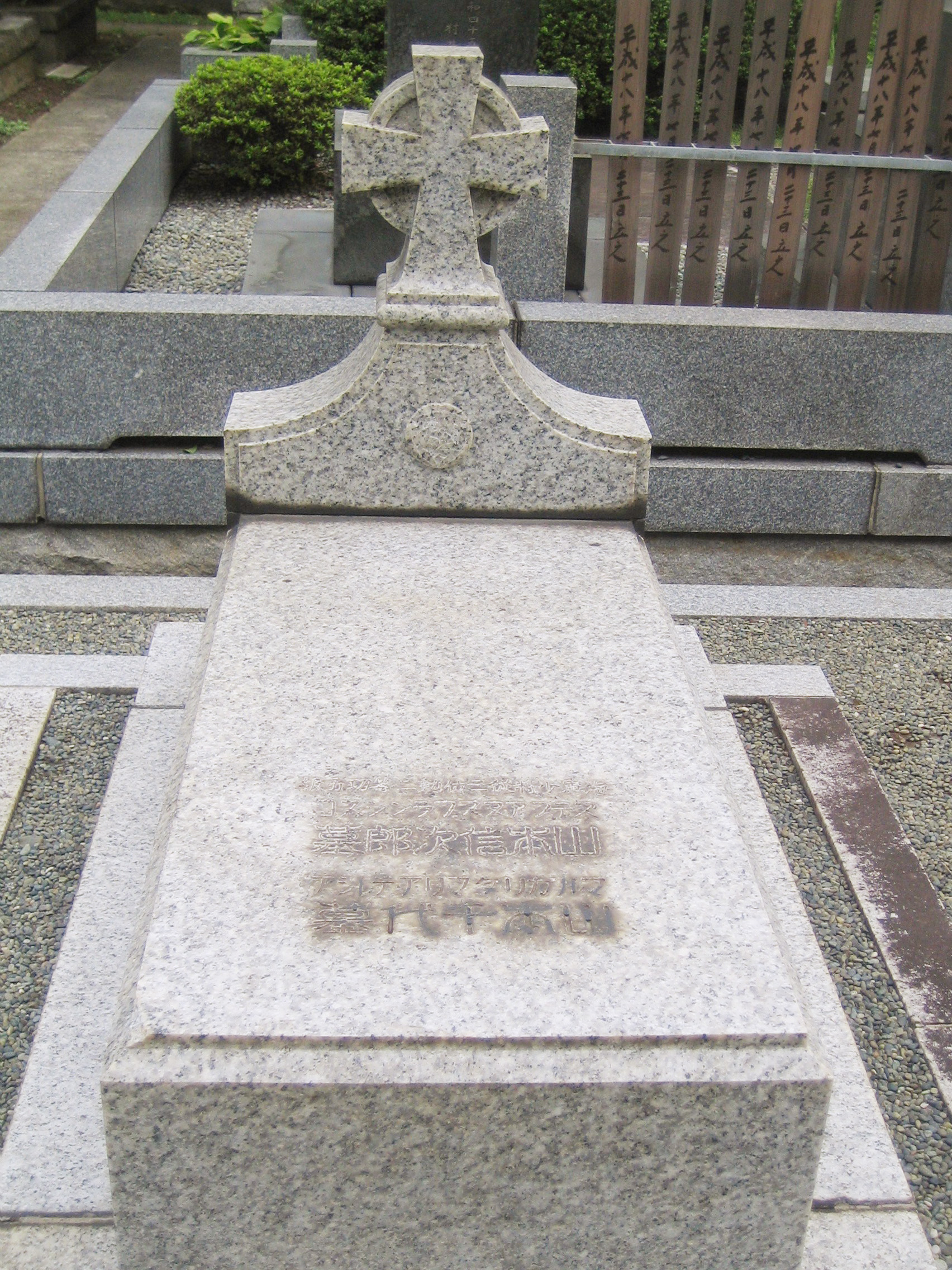
Grave of Shinjiro Yamamoto, in the Aoyama Cemetery

== In media ==
He was played by actor Seiji Hino in the 2009 Japanese war drama TV series Saka no ue no kumo (Clouds Above the Hill), based on the book of the same name by Ryōtarō Shiba.

== Decorations ==
- Order of the Golden Kite, 2nd Class
- Order of the Rising Sun, 3rd Class
- Order of Leopold, Officer
- Order of Saint Stanislaus, 3rd Class
- Knight of the Order of Saint Gregory the Great (military class)

== See also ==
- Catholic Church in Japan
- Kirishitan
