= Aoyama Cemetery =

Cemetery in Tokyo, Japan

- 青山霊園
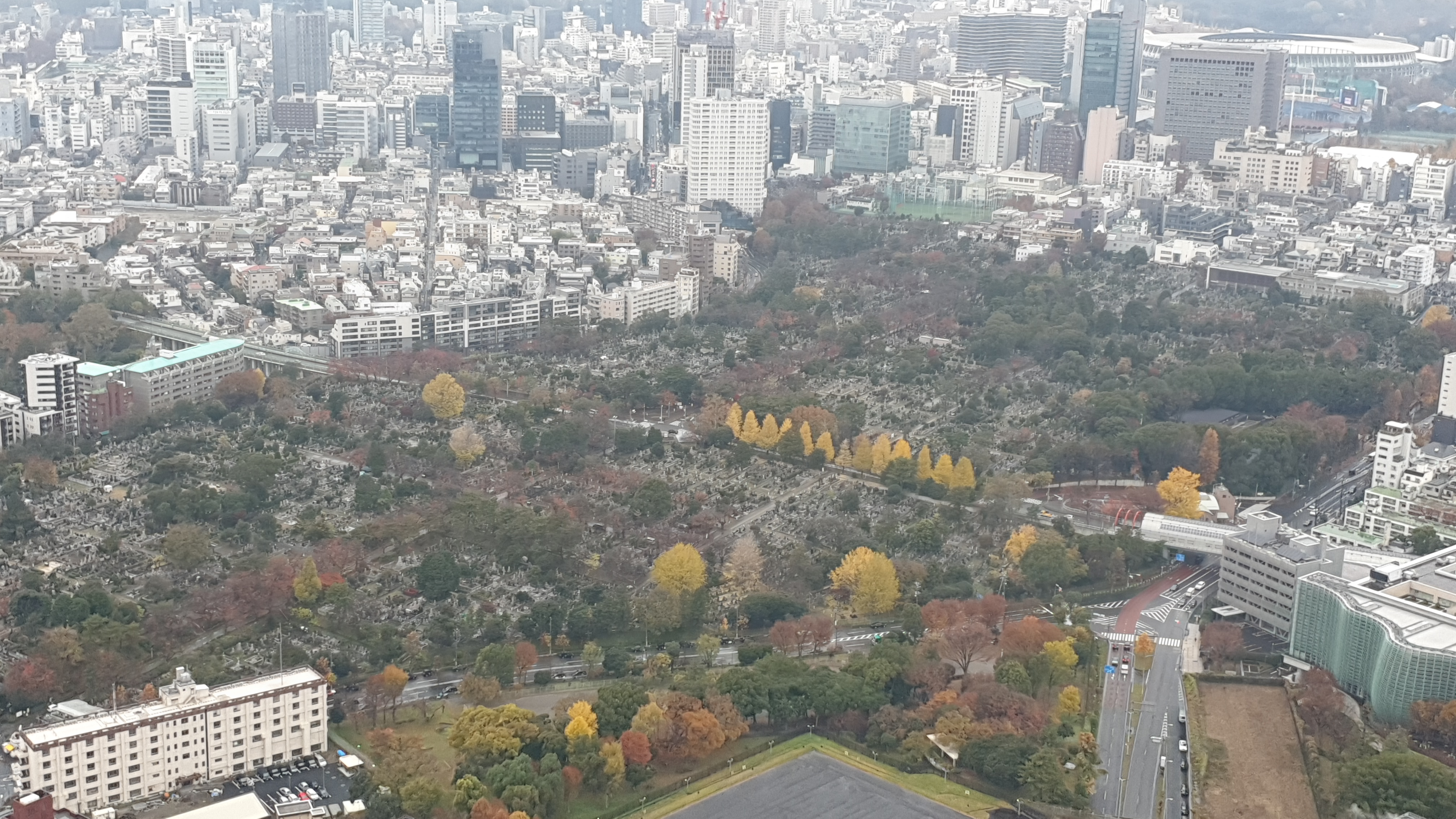
- Aoyama cemetery viewed from Roppongi Hills
- Interactive map of Aoyama Cemetery

Details
- Established: 1874
- Location: Aoyama, Tokyo
- Country: Japan
- Coordinates: 35°39′58″N 139°43′20″E
- Size: 26.36 hectares (65.1 acres)

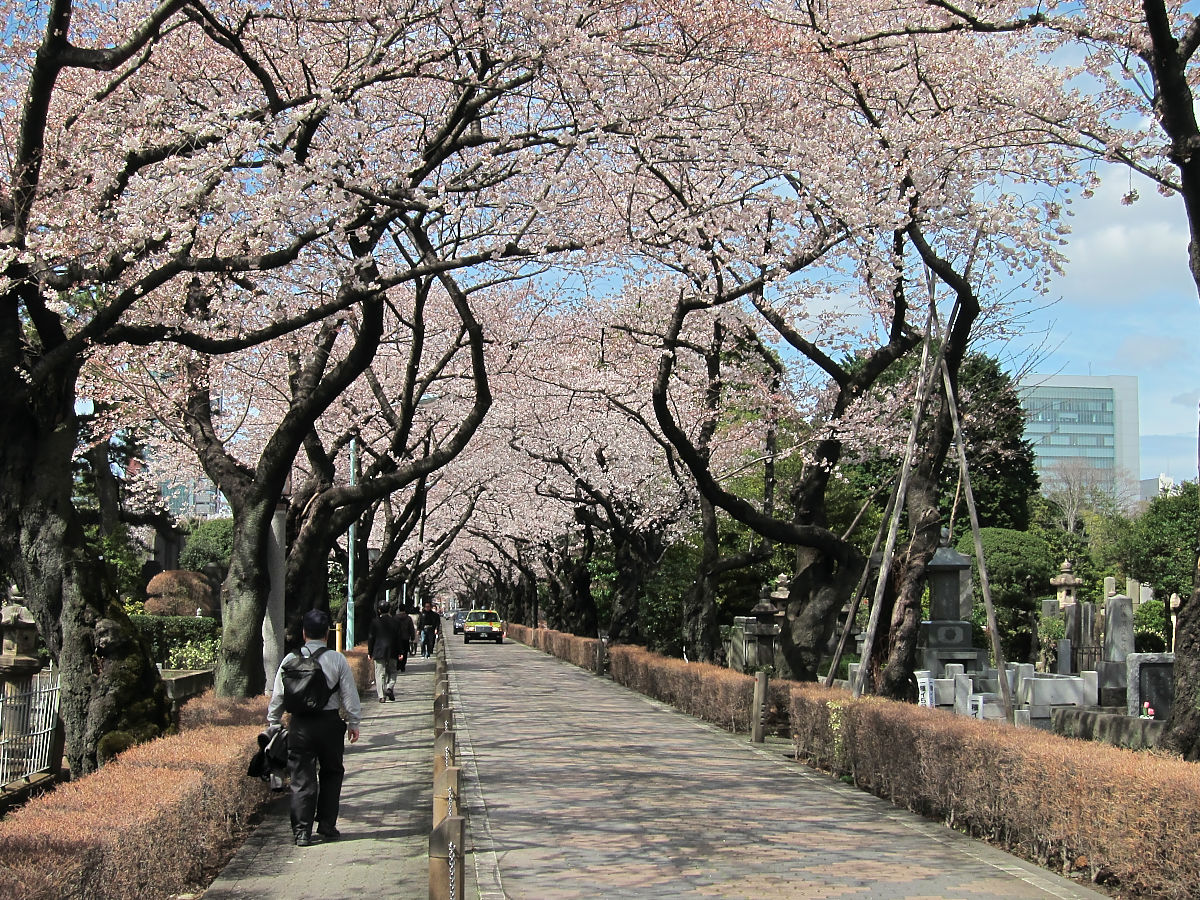
Cherry trees of Aoyama Cemetery

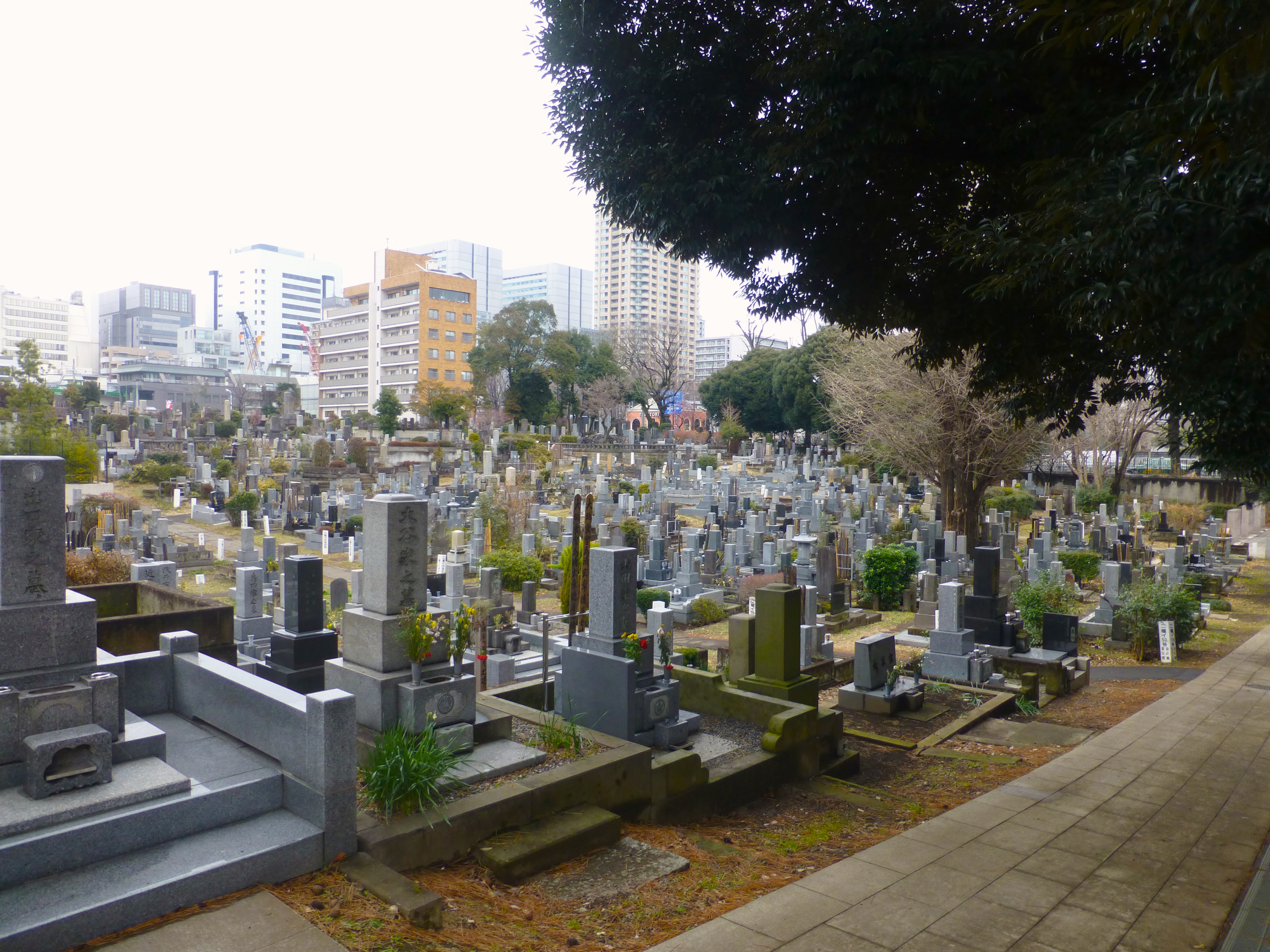
View inside the cemetery

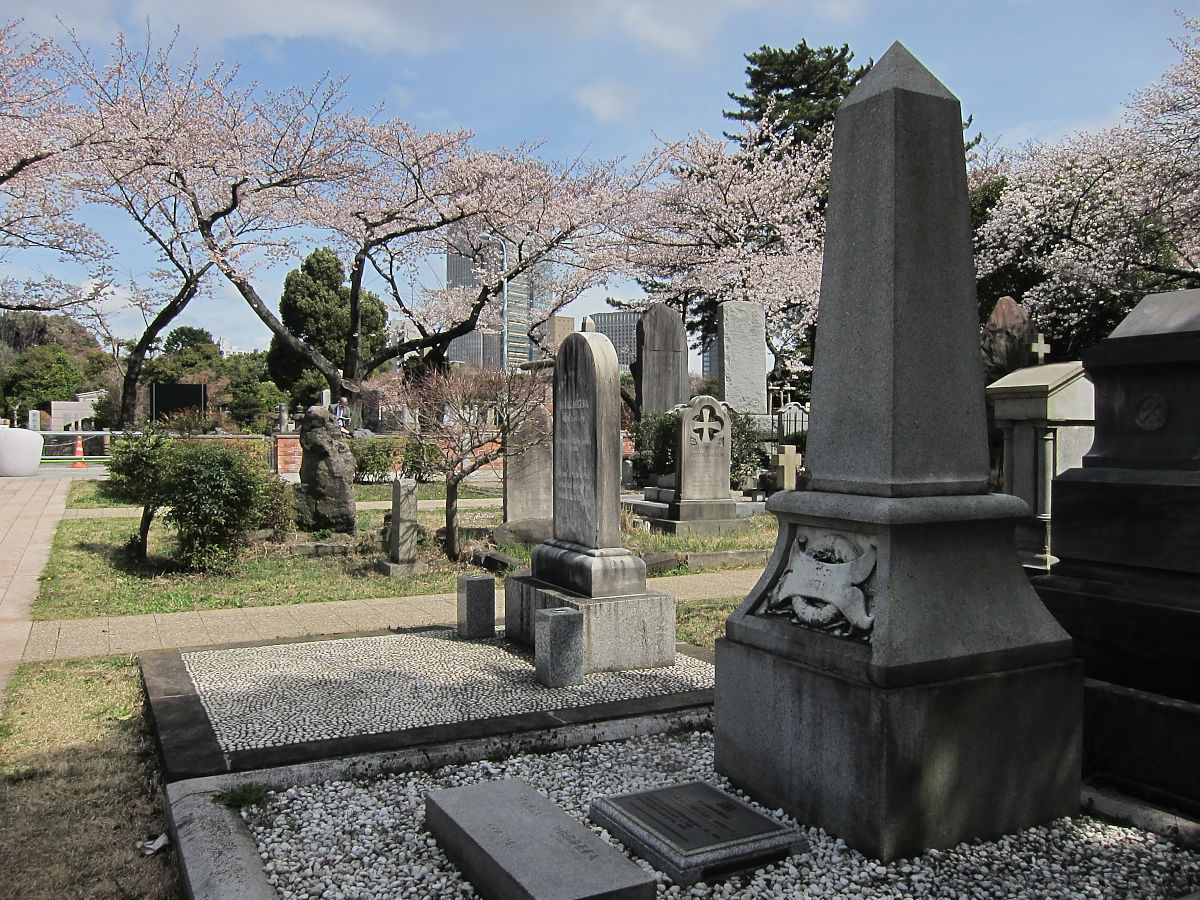
Foreign section – Grave of Guido Verbeck.

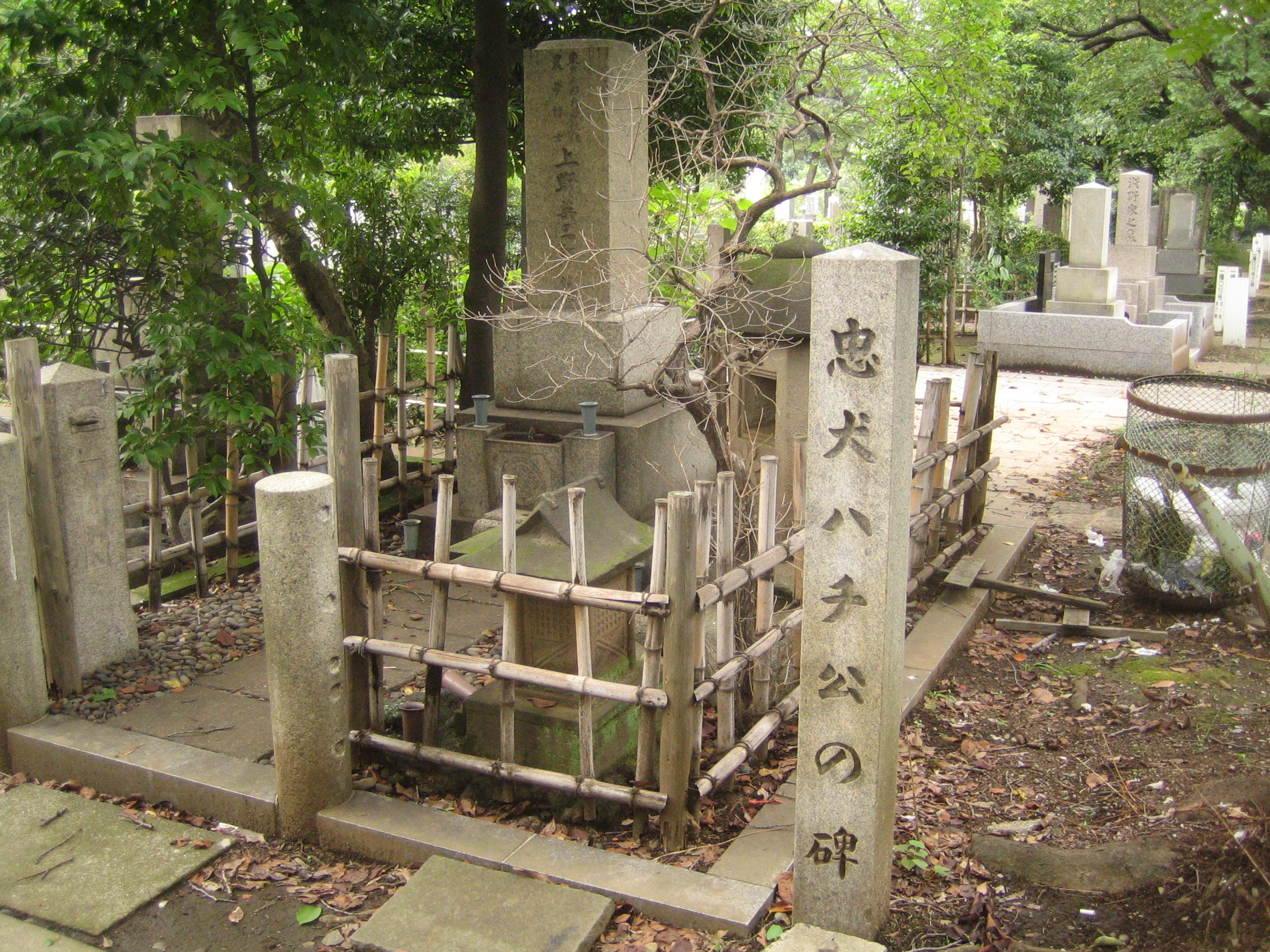
Grave of Hidesaburō Ueno and monument to Hachikō (right stele).

Aoyama Cemetery (Japanese: 青山霊園, Hepburn: Aoyama reien) is a cemetery in Aoyama, Tokyo, Japan, managed by the Tokyo Metropolitan Government. The cemetery is known for its cherry blossoms and is popular during the season of hanami.

== History ==
The cemetery was originally the land of the Aoyama family of the Gujō clan (now Gujō, Gifu) in the province of Mino (now Gifu). Japan's first public cemetery was opened in 1874, and in the Meiji era was the main locations of foreigners' graves.

The cemetery has an area of 263,564 m^{2}.

== Japanese section ==
The Japanese section includes the graves of many notable Japanese, including:

- Hachikō, buried with his owner Hidesaburō Ueno
- Amino Kiku - novelist
- Gotō Shōjirō - samurai and politician
- Ichikawa Danjūrō IX - actor
- Ichikawa Danjūrō XI - actor
- Kitasato Shibasaburō - physician and bacteriologist
- Misao Fujimura - writer
- Nakae Chōmin - politician
- Ijichi Masaharu - samurai of the Shimazu clan
- Nogi Maresuke - governor-general of Japanese Taiwan, general of the Imperial Japanese Army
- Ōkubo Toshimichi - statesman and samurai
- Otoya Yamaguchi - right-wing ultranationalist youth who assassinated Japanese Socialist Party chairman Inejirō Asanuma
- Sasaki Takayuki - politician
- Shiga Naoya - writer
- Doppo Kunikida - writer
- Shinichi Hoshi - writer
- Nishi Takeichi - IJA officer and 1932 Olympic equestrian gold medalist
- Kuroda Kiyotaka - Prime Minister of Japan (1888–1899)
- Katō Tomosaburō - Prime Minister of Japan (1922–1923)
- Yamamoto Gonnohyōe - Imperial Japanese Navy Admiral and Prime Minister of Japan (1913–1914, 1923–1924)
- Osachi Hamaguchi - Prime Minister of Japan (1929–1931)
- Inukai Tsuyoshi - Prime Minister of Japan (1931–1932)
- Kuniaki Koiso - Prime Minister of Japan (1944–1945)
- Shigeru Yoshida - Prime Minister of Japan (1946–1947, 1948–1954)
- Nabeshima Naohiro - 11th daimyō of Saga Domain
- Shinjiro Yamamoto - Imperial Japanese Navy admiral
- Ijuin Gorō - Imperial Japanese Navy admiral
- Takashima Tomonosuke - politician, Imperial Japanese Army general, and samurai of the Satsuma Domain
- Kawakami Soroku - Imperial Japanese Army general
- Nozu Michitsura - Imperial Japanese Army field marshal
- Sano Tsunetami - statesman and founder of the Japanese Red Cross Society
- Bunzō Hayata - botanist and taxonomist
- Kokichi Mikimoto - entrepreneur and inventor of cultured pearls
- Keiji Sada - actor
- Kadono Jūkurō - businessman, railway engineer, and chairman of Ōkura Gumi (1914–1937)
- Nagaoka Gaishi - Imperial Japanese Army officer

=== Tateyama Branch ===
The cemetery also has a Tateyama branch, where Nagata Tetsuzan, Kimura Heitarō, and Sagara Sōzō are buried.

The famous city pop singer Miki Matsubara is also buried in the cemetery, although the exact location remains currently undisclosed.

=== Grave of Hachikō ===
One of the cemetery's most famous graves is that of Hachikō, the faithful and dutiful dog whose statue adorns Shibuya Station. He was buried alongside his two owners, Hidesaburō Ueno and Yaeko Sakano.

Inside Aoyama Cemetery, 2022

== Foreign section ==
The cemetery includes a gaikokujin bochi (foreign cemetery), one of the few such plots in Tokyo. Many of the graves are of foreign experts who came to Japan at the end of the 19th century, as part of the Meiji Government's drive for modernisation. Although some of the graves were threatened with removal in 2005 due to unpaid annual fees, the Foreign Section was awarded special protection in 2007. A plaque on the site recognises the men and women who contributed to Japan's modernization.

Some of the noted foreigners buried within the cemetery:

- Thomas Baty (1869–1954), English lawyer, writer and activist
- Francis Brinkley (1841–1912), Anglo-Irish journalist and scholar
- Edoardo Chiossone (1833–1898), Italian engraver
- W. K. Burton (1856–1899), Scottish engineer and photographer
- Edwin Dun (1848–1931), American agricultural advisor.
- Frank Warrington Eastlake (1856–1905), English-language educator.
- William Clark Eastlake (1834–1887), American dentist, "Dental Pioneer of the Orient"
- Hugh Fraser (1837–1894), British Envoy Extraordinary and Minister Plenipotentiary to Japan
- Flora B. Harris, American missionary and translator, wife of Merriman Colbert Harris
- Merriman Colbert Harris (1846–1921), American Methodist missionary
- Henry Hartshorne (1823–1897), American Quaker missionary and doctor, father of Anna Hartshorne
- Joseph Heco (1837–1897), the first naturalized Japanese-American
- Paul Jacoulet (1902–1960), French woodblock print artist in the Japanese style
- Arthur Lloyd (1852–1911), English Anglican Church in Japan minister, Keio University professor and translator
- Henry Spencer Palmer (1838–1893) British engineer and journalist
- Julius Scriba (1848–1905), German surgeon
- Alexander Croft Shaw (1846–1902), Canadian Anglican Church in Japan minister, Keio University professor
- Frederick William Strange (1853–1889), British. University instructor, founder of competitive rowing in Japan
- Guido Verbeck (1830–1898), Dutch political advisor, educator, and missionary
- Gottfried Wagener (1831–1892), German chemist, educator and ceramics specialist
- Charles Dickinson West (1847–1908), Irish engineer
- Kim Okkyun (1851–1894), Korean scholar-bureaucrat
- Henry Willard Denison - (1846–1914), American judge and diplomat

== See also ==
- Zōshigaya cemetery
- Yanaka cemetery
