= Kadono Jūkurō =

Japanese businessman (1867–1958)

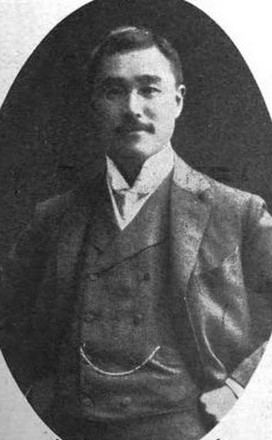
Kadono Ikunoshin

Kadono Jūkurō (門野重九郎; 1867 - 1958) was a Japanese railway engineer, businessman, and the Chairman of Ōkura Gumi (1914 - 1937).

== Career ==
He was born in Toba, Mie, as the second son of Watari Kadono, Karō of Toba Domain. He had an elder brother Kadono Ikunoshin, who later became the founder and president of Chiyoda Mutual Life Insurance Company (Chiyoda Seimei Hoken), and Japan Conscription Insurance (Nihon Chōhei Hoken).

He studied Financial Management and Law at Keio University, and after graduating from the Faculty of Engineering, University of Tokyo, he joined the Pennsylvania Railroad as an intern in 1891 and learned practices for four years.

He worked for the San'yō Railway in Japan. In 1897, he was recruited by Ōkura Kihachirō to join his construction and real estate company, Ōkura Gumi, and became its London branch manager. He later served as chairman of the company from 1914 to 1937.

His tomb is in the Aoyama Cemetery in Tokyo.

== Honors ==
For his efforts as an officer of Okura Gumi, Kadono was honored by the government of Chile, which had gained independence from Spain in 1818 and had taken in Japanese immigrants, with a Grand Officer for Services. The Japanese government allowed him to receive it on December 6, 1938.
