= Arthur Lloyd (missionary) =

19th and 20th-century Anglican priest, scholar, and missionary

The Reverend Arthur Lloyd
- Missionary
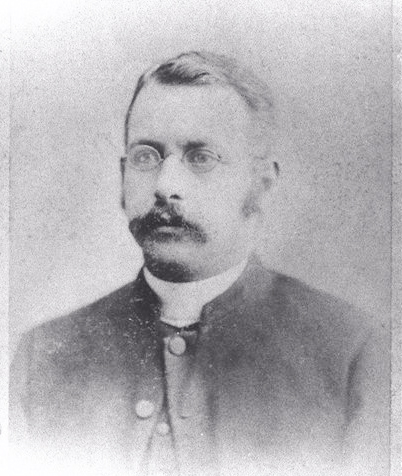

Personal details
- Born: April 10, 1852 Simla, British India
- Died: 27 October 1911 (aged 59) Tokyo, Japan

Arthur Lloyd (10 April 1852 – 27 October 1911) was a minister of the Church of England, fellow and Dean of Peterhouse, Cambridge, academic, translator, and biographer. He also served as an Anglican missionary to Japan.

== Background and early life ==
Lloyd was born in Shimla, British India in 1852, the son of Major Frederick Lloyd of the Bengal Native Infantry. He was educated at Brewood Grammar School, Staffordshire, St John's College and Peterhouse, Cambridge where he obtained a First Class degree in classics in 1874.

Lloyd was consecrated as a deacon in 1875 and as a priest in 1876 in the Church of England by William Jacobson, the Bishop of Chester. He served as curate at St. Barnabas, Liverpool from 1875 to 1876 and subsequently at St. Mary the Great, Cambridge from 1877 to 1879. He was appointed a Fellow and Dean of Peterhouse 1877–1879. Immediately prior to setting out for Japan he served jointly as the rector of Norton parish and as vicar of Hunstanton, Norfolk. He was married with two children and an adopted niece.

== Missionary work in Japan ==
Lloyd arrived in Japan in 1884 as a missionary for the Society for the Propagation of the Gospel.

As well as his church mission work, Lloyd held various positions in Japan as an academic at Keio University, a lecturer at the Imperial University and at the Imperial Navy War College. From 1897 to 1903 Lloyd served as president of Rikkyo University.

For many years, both as librarian and as serving president from 1903 to 1905, Lloyd was an active member of the Asiatic Society of Japan, serving as their president from 1903 to 1905. Much of Lloyd's early studies of Japanese Buddhism were published in the Transactions of the Asiatic Society of Japan.

Lloyd is buried in Aoyama Cemetery.

== Published works ==
- Development of Japanese Buddhism, 1894
- The Life of Admiral Togo, 1905
- The praises of Amida : seven Buddhist sermons, 1907
- The wheat among the tares : studies of Buddhism in Japan, 1908
- Every-day Japan : : written after twenty-five years' residence and work in the country, 1909
- Shinran and his work : studies in Shinshu theology, 1910
- The Creed of Half Japan, Historical Sketches of Japanese Buddhism, 1911
