= Kadono Ikunoshin =

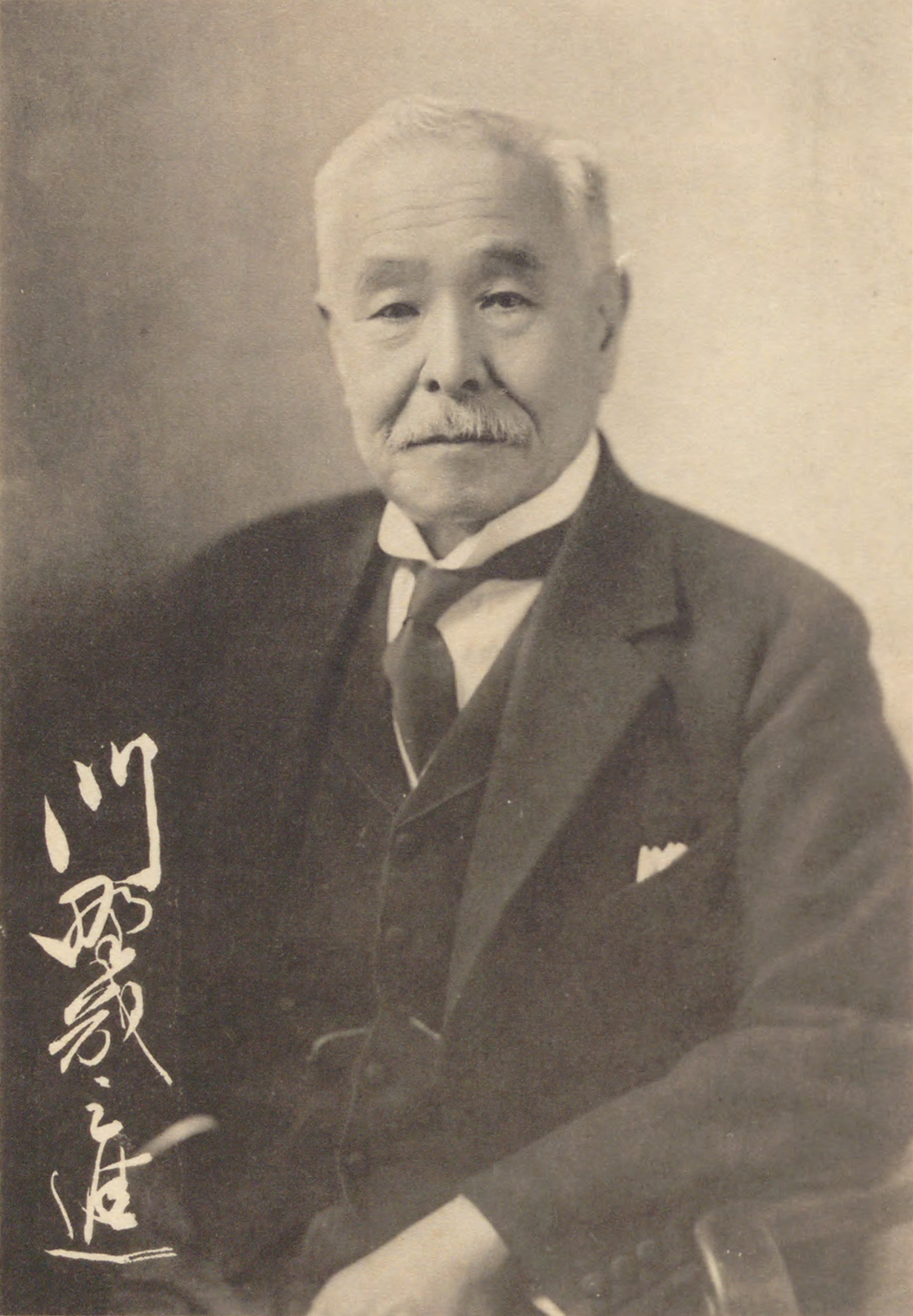
Kadono Ikunoshin

Kadono Ikunoshin (門野幾之進; 1856 – 1938) was a Japanese samurai and businessman. He has a younger brother Kadono Jūkurō (1867 - 1958) who was a Japanese railway engineer, businessman, and the Chairman of Ōkura Gumi (1914 - 1937).

== Career ==
In 1904, Kadono founded Chiyoda Mutual Life Insurance Company (Chiyoda Seimei Hoken). It was the first in Japan with an American structure. In 1906, he was a founder of Chiyoda Fire Insurance (Chiyoda Kasai Hoken).
