= Domingos Chohachi Nakamura =

Servant of God Domingos Chōhachi Nakamura
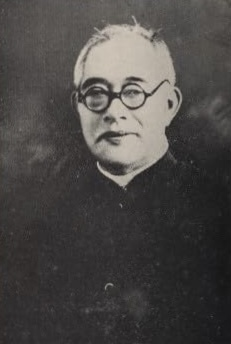
- Native name: （ドミンゴス）中村長八
- Church: Roman Catholic Church
- Archdiocese: Nagasaki

Orders
- Ordination: January 7th, 1897 by Jules-Alphonse Cousin, MEP, Bishop of Nagasaki

Personal details
- Born: August 22, 1865 Fukue-jima in Goto Islands (Nagasaki Prefecture, Japan)
- Died: March 14, 1940 (aged 74) Álvares Machado (São Paulo State, Brazil)
- Parents: Hatsugorō (初五郎) and Tsugue (ツグエ)

Fr. Domingos Chōhachi Nakamura (ドミンゴス中村長八; 22 August 1865 – 14 March 1940) was a Catholic missionary and priest from the Diocese of Nagasaki, Japan. Fr. Nakamura worked as a priest for 26 years in Japan and 17 years in Brazil, where he died in 1940 with a reputation for holiness. He is now a Servant of God.

== Life ==
Father Nakamura was born in Fukue-jima, the main island of the Goto Islands (Nagasaki Prefecture), in a Catholic family. At the age of 3 he lost his father in a maritime accident, and his mother and sister at the age of 15. In 1880. he joined the Catholic Seminary in Nagasaki, completing his studies in Philosophy and Theology with excellent grades. During these years he learned French and Latin, which would be useful for his future missionary work outside Japan. On January 7, 1897, Nakamura was ordained by Jules-Alphonse Cousin, bishop of Nagasaki.

Starting two weeks after his priestly ordination, he worked for 26 years as a diocesan priest in the island of Amami Oshima (Kagoshima Prefecture), before emigrating to Brazil in 1923 to work on behalf of the Japanese migrants living there, where he worked until his death for 17 years. Nakamura was the first Japanese missionary to work abroad.

Despite his age, he worked from 58 to 76 years old in the pastoral work of Japanese migrants in the Brazilian states of São Paulo, Mato Grosso, Paraná and south part of Minas Gerais. He died in reputation for holiness in 1940, while in Álvares Machado. His process of beatification started in 2002, in the Diocese of Bauru (Brazil). The postulator is Rubens Miraglia Zani.

During his 17 years of pastoral work in Brazil, he allegedly baptized 1.750 people (1.304 Japanese, 440 Brazilians and 6 Japanese-Brazilians). Nakamura was the first priest to work on behalf of the Japanese community in Brazil; today, the majority of these Japanese descendants (nikkei) are Catholic, thanks to the evangelization work done throughout the 20th century by both Japanese and Brazilian priests.

== Bibliography ==
- ONICHI, Pedro (2005). "Domingos Chohachi Nakamura: O Apóstolo dos Imigrantes Japoneses". Fragata.
- SHINTANI, Alberto Hikaru (2015). «The Japanese immigrants in Brazil and the social role of the Catholic Church" (in Japanese). "The annual review of migration studies".
- ヴェンデリーノ・ローシャイタ著「ドミンゴス中村長八神父―ブラジル日本移民の父」、水野一編『日本とラテンアメリカの関係―日本の国際化におけるラテンアメリカ』p. 74–81（上智大学イベロアメリカ研究所編、1990年）
- 佐藤清太郎著『中村長八先生略伝 : 在外日本人の師表』（信友社、1952年）
- 佐藤清太郎著『中村神父を思う : ブラジル移民の父』（明西社、1958年）
- 『朝日日本歴史人物事典』（朝日新聞出版）
- 『デジタル版 日本人名大辞典』（講談社）
- 雑誌『ブラジル特報』（日本ブラジル中央協会発行、2007年11月号）

== Honors and appointments ==
- In 1938 he was given the Papal medal of Saint Gregory the Great by Admiral Shinjiro Yamamoto, a Catholic admiral of the Japanese Navy and special envoy from Pope Pius XI.
- In 1940 he was appointed apostolic administrator of the Diocese of Kagoshima (Japan), but the letter of papal appointment arrived in Álvares Machado some days after his death.

== See also ==
- Catholic Church in Japan
- Christianity in Japan
- Japanese diaspora
- Catholic Church in Brazil
