= Frederick William Strange (rower) =

English-born rower, sportsman and university educator

Frederick William Strange (29 October 1853 – 5 July 1889) was an English-born rower, sportsman and university educator credited with the introduction of competitive rowing and popularising both athletics and outdoor team sports in Meiji era Japan.

== Biography ==
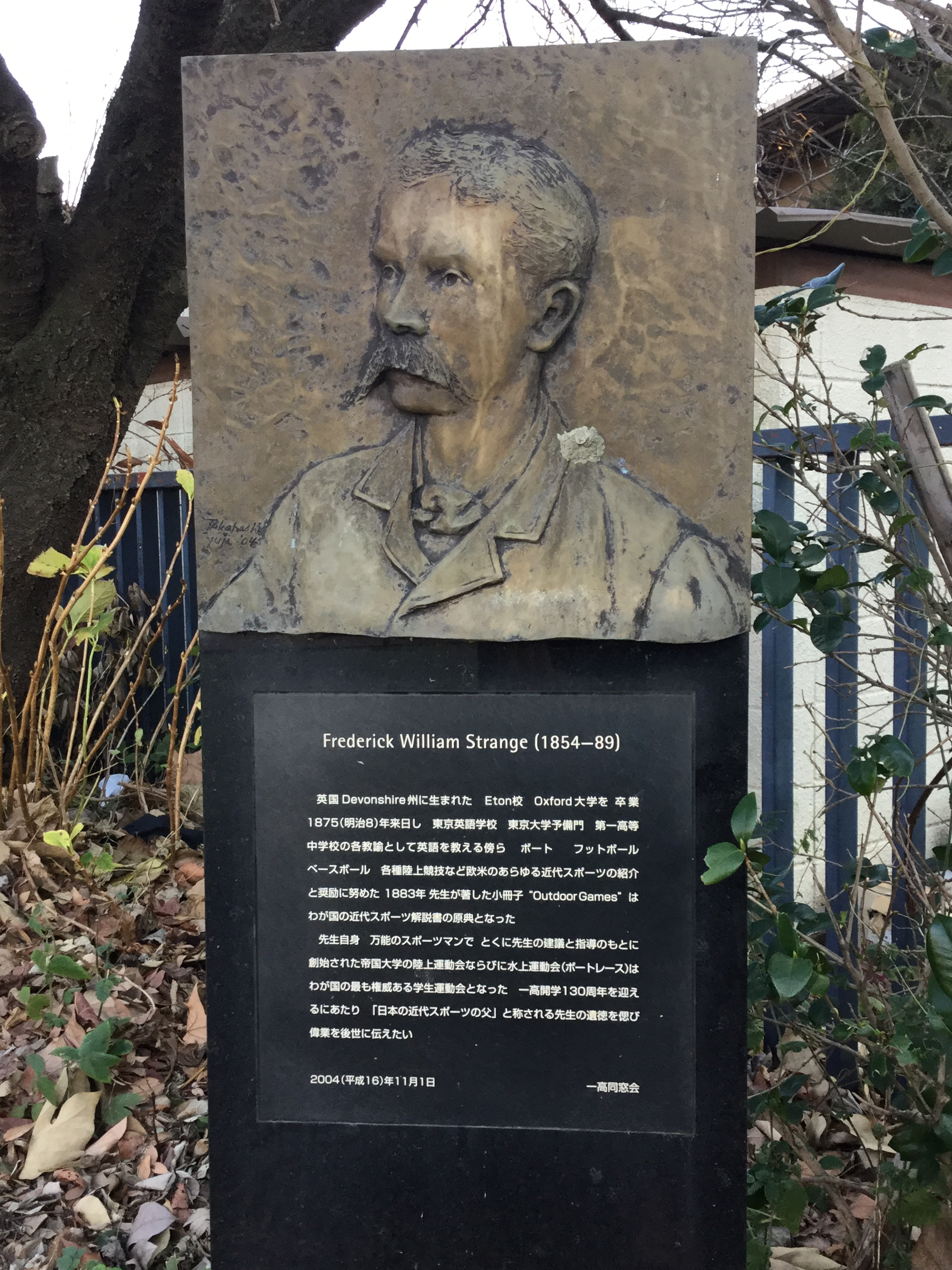
Memorial to Frederick William Strange, located at the athletic track at the University of Tokyo, Komaba Campus. The Japanese dedication erroneously states that Strange was born in Devonshire and was a graduate of both Eton and the University of Oxford

Born in London, the fifth of eight children of city wine merchant James Thompson Strange and his wife Martha. As a student at University College School, Strange encountered Kikuchi Dairoku, one of the first native born Japanese students to study in England.

Strange was from the age of seventeen a regular rower on the Thames at Chiswick. After leaving University College School, he studied for a period in Thanet, Kent and obtained a school instructor qualification under the auspices of The College of Preceptors. The school instructor qualification was administered externally by the University of Oxford Delegacy for Local Examinations.

Strange arrived in Japan on the O&O steamship RMS Oceanic at the treaty port of Yokohama on 23 March 1875. At the age of 21 he was appointed as an instructor at the First Higher School in Hitotsubashi, Tokyo, precursor institution to both Hitotsubashi University and the University of Tokyo. He was he author of the guide Outdoor Sports, published in Japan 1883, which included descriptions of rounders, field hockey, football, cricket, baseball and a variety of athletic track and field activities. He is credited as the father of competitive rowing in Japan.

He married an American, Edith Dwight Sandford on 29 December 1881. Strange's grave is located in Aoyama Cemetery, central Tokyo.

The Brentford & Chiswick Local History Society carries on its website a short biography outlining Strange's life in Chiswick and Hammersmith and rowing on the Thames.
