= Frederick Strange (painter) =

Frederick Strange (c. 1807–1873) was an English house-painter and portraitist who was transported to the colony of Van Diemen's Land (later Tasmania) in January 1838 for the crime of stealing a watch. He moved between Hobart and Launceston and was pardoned in 1848. In 1851 he exhibited views of the area around Launceston at the Launceston Art Exhibition.

== Sources ==
- Craig, Clifford; Mead, Isabella (1963). "Frederick Strange—Artist—c.1807–1873" (PDF). Papers and Proceedings of the Royal Society of Tasmania. 97: 49–51.
- Mead, Isabella J. (2006) [1967]. "Frederick Strange (1807–1873)". Australian Dictionary of Biography. Vol. 2 (online ed.). National Centre of Biography, Australian National University.
- Kerr, Joan; Stilwell, G. T. (19 October 2011) [1 January 1992]. "Frederick Strange b. c.1807". Dictionary of Australian Artists Online. Design and Art Australia Online.
