= Joseph Heco =

American journalist

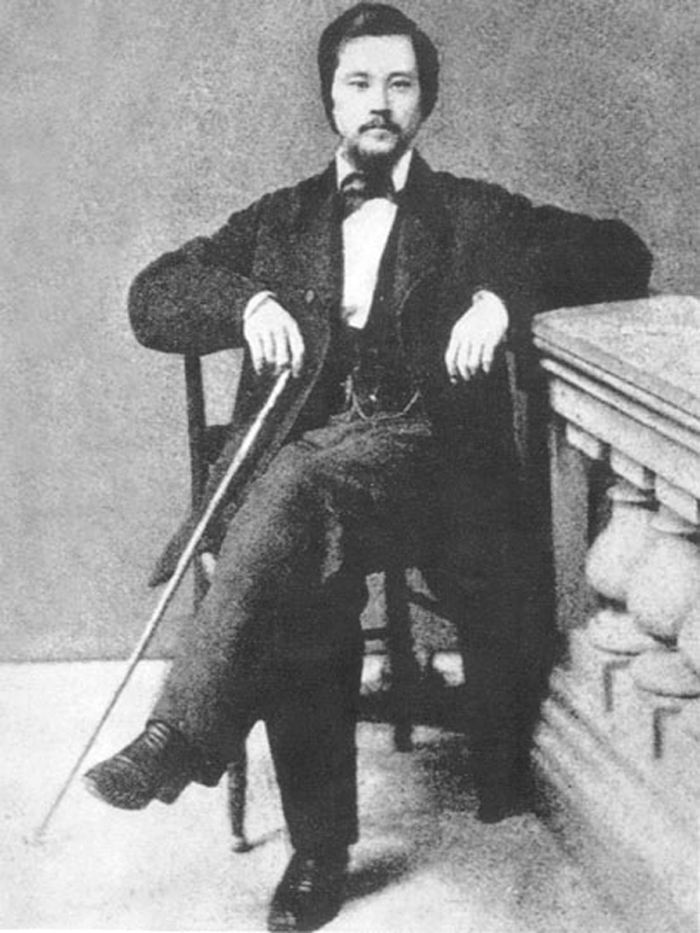
Joseph Heco

Joseph Heco (born Hikozō Hamada (浜田彦蔵, Hamada Hikozō) September 20, 1837 – December 12, 1897) was the first Japanese person to be naturalized as a United States citizen and the first to publish a Japanese language newspaper.

== Early years ==
Hikozō Hamada was born in Harima province, the son of a local landowner. Following his father's death, his mother remarried. The fatherless boy had been accepted by a temple school for training and education, something unusual for someone of his social class. His mother died when he was twelve, but his stepfather, a seaman on a freighter often away from home, continued to care for the boy. A year later when returning from Edo after a sightseeing journey, their ship, the Eiriki Maru (栄力丸), was dismasted and blown off course in a severe storm in the Pacific.

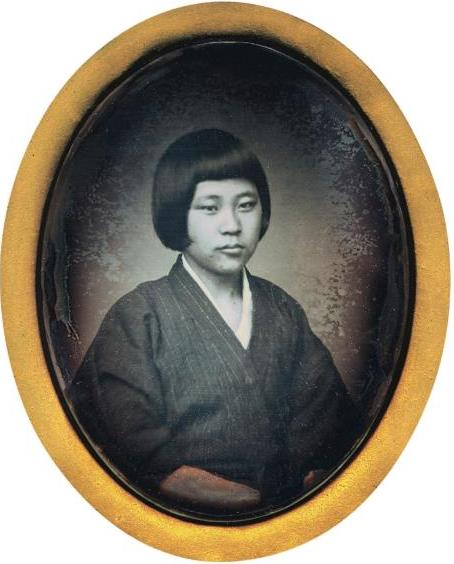
Heco in 1851

The American freighter Auckland picked up seventeen survivors from the sea and brought them to San Francisco in February 1851. This was the second time Japanese castaways would come to San Francisco. John Manjiro was the first, although Hasekura Tsunenaga had earlier sailed past Cape Mendocino. The Eiriki Maru's cook, Sentarō, then became the first Japanese person known to have his photograph taken, and would soon traverse the continent.

In 1852 the group was sent to Macau to join Commodore Matthew Perry as a gesture to help open diplomatic relations with Japan. However, Heco met an American interpreter who asked him to return to the United States with him and learn English, with the thought that Heco would be able return to Japan with important language skills when the country was open for trade. Heco accepted the offer and arrived in San Francisco in June 1853.

Heco attended a Roman Catholic school in Baltimore and was baptized "Joseph" in 1854. He returned to the West Coast for further study, when in 1857 he was invited by California Senator William M. Gwin to come with him to Washington, D.C. as his secretary. Here he became the first nonofficial Japanese person to be introduced to a U.S. president. Heco stayed with Gwin until February 1858. He then joined Lt. J.M. Brooke on a survey of the coast of China and Japan. In June of that year, Heco became the first Japanese subject to become an American citizen.

== Interpreting career ==
Heco (right) and Eugene Miller Van Reed c. 1858

Realizing the treaty ports in Japan were scheduled to open on July 1, 1859, Heco left his ship and went to Hong Kong. Here he joined Townsend Harris, returning to Japan on the USS Mississippi. In Shanghai, Heco also met E.M. Door, scheduled to be the American Consul at Kanagawa. Heco accepted Door's offer of a job as his interpreter. Heco left Shanghai on June 15, 1859, and arrived at Nagasaki. Heco had been asked to stay in the background, but following an incident between an American sailor and a Japanese, he intervened when the Japanese interpreter did not know enough English to handle the situation. The Japanese interpreter was dumbfounded and questioned Heco closely. The Mississippi left Nagasaki on June 22 – without Heco ever setting foot on land.

Heco worked as interpreter for the U.S. Consulate in Kanagawa but resigned on February 1, 1860. He became a general commission agent in nearby Yokohama, waiting for the arrival of his partner from California. However, the partnership was dissolved on March 1, 1861, after doing poorly for a year. Heco returned to the United States in September 1861 on board the USS Carrington. In Yokohama he met Wilhelm Heine, Francis Hall and Mikhail Bakunin and traveled back to San Francisco with Bakunin in September. In March 1862 he met President Abraham Lincoln.

Heco returned to Kanagawa at the end of September 1862 and began work at the U.S. Consulate once again. After nearly a year, he left to establish a trading firm. In 1863, Heco began his publishing career with Hyōryūki (漂流記 Record of a Castaway), an account of his experiences in America. From 1864 to 1866, Heco helped publish the first Japanese language newspaper, the Kaigai Shinbun. Today, Heco is regarded in Japan as the father of Japanese journalism.

== Business career ==
On January 3, 1867, Heco went to Nagasaki to look after the business of an American friend, A. D. Weld French, who was leaving Japan. He registered at the U.S. Consulate in Nagasaki as an American citizen. Later in the month, the daimyō of Hizen asked Heco to be his agent in Nagasaki. On May 13, Heco also went to work for Glover & Co. One of the partners, K.R. Mackenzie, asked Heco to help acquire the rights to the Takashima coal mine. Eventually, however, with Heco's assistance, Mackenzie and Glover overcame various problems to establish a partnership.

In June 1867, Kido Koin and Itō Hirobumi (Chōshū samurai) called upon Heco under the guise of being Satsuma officials, and asked questions about the United States and England, especially regarding the U.S. Constitution. In October, they called again and asked Heco to serve as their agent in Nagasaki. He did so for two years without remuneration. Heco later helped Itō visit England with the assistance of British Admiral Henry Keppel of the H.M.S. Salamis.

On January 1, 1868, Kobe was opened as a treaty port and, according to Heco, "Yokohama, Nagasaki, and the China ports all sent their quota of bearded foreigners on the hunt for the Almighty Dollar." Heco described these early days of 1868 as troubled times. "Wild and disquieting rumours of the happenings in Kyoto and Osaka were ever arriving."

In February 1868, the victorious forces of the Boshin War of the Meiji Restoration promised that they would not harm foreigners in Nagasaki. Heco went with Francis Groom of Glover & Co. to Osaka to negotiate the transfer of the CSS Stonewall to the Japanese government. That summer Heco was asked to find a Western physician for the daimyō of Hizen. He found Dr. Samuel Boyer of the USS Iroquois. Heco moved between Nagasaki and Osaka at this time and reported on the rice riots of 1869. In February 1870 the Japanese government began to persecute the 3000 Christians from Urakami, and Glover & Co. went bankrupt.

In the month of August the firm I had been serving since 1867 [Glover & Co.] failed all of a sudden. The first meeting of creditors was held at the English Consulate in Nagasaki on the 16th Sept., and on the 19th, the firm laid a full statement of affairs before them.

In October, Heco accompanied Mackenzie to Kobe. He was soon back in Nagasaki, leasing a house on the bund [No. 1 Oura] and began a business as a commercial agent. He also was appointed by the daimyō of Hizen to look after his interests in the Takashima coal mine. Visiting the daimyo in Kobe, in 1871, he stayed a month. Then in December, he went with Thomas Glover to visit the daimyō of Kumamoto at his castle, but the daimyō was away at the time. They still, however, received a tour of the castle before returning to Nagasaki.

In May 1872, Heco received an offer to work under Inoue Kaoru, the Minister of Finance. He left Nagasaki in early August to do so. However, he had the opportunity to witness the Meiji Emperor's visit to Nagasaki on July 19 before he left. Heco stayed with the Finance Ministry until the beginning of 1874, when he left of his own accord. In May 1875 Heco went to work in Kobe, where he remained until becoming ill in 1881. Heco died in 1897. As an American he was buried in the foreign section of Aoyama Cemetery in Aoyama, Tokyo.

== Selected works ==
In a statistical overview derived from writings by and about Joseph Heco, OCLC/WorldCat encompasses roughly 30+ works in 100+ publications in 5 languages and 1,100+ library holdings.

- 漂流記 (1863)
- 開国之滴: 漂流異譚. 上 (1893)
- The narrative of a Japanese; what he has seen and the people he has met in the course of the last forty years (1890)
- Erinnerungen eines Japaners: Schilderung der Entwicklung Japan's vor und seit der Eröffnung bis auf die Neuzeit (1898)

== See also ==
- 19156 Heco, an asteroid named after Heco
- Foreign cemeteries in Japan
