= Eugene Miller Van Reed =

Eugene Van Reed (left) and Joseph Heco c. 1858

Eugene Miller Van Reed (May 17, 1835 – February 2, 1873) was a Dutch American merchant who was the Kingdom of Hawaii's first consul in Japan. He was the person who brought the first group of Japanese immigrants to Hawaii. They became known as the "Gannenmono".

== Early life ==
Eugene Miller Van Reed was born in Reading, Pennsylvania, on May 17, 1835, to a Dutch American father, James Huy Van Reed (1809–1884), and his wife, Juliana Hiester Miller Van Reed (1813–1892). He had a sister, Margaret.

== Career ==
As he met Joseph Heco (Hikozō Hamada) in U.S. and became interested in Japan, he started to work at the United States Consulate in Kanagawa in 1859. After returning to U.S., he came back to Japan as the Kingdom of Hawaii's consul general in 1866, and tried unsuccessfully to get the bilateral treaty between the Kingdom and Japan. He then lived in Japan and worked as a merchant.

When Takahashi Korekiyo traveled abroad with Katsu Kaishu's son, Kotaro, in the third year of Keio (1867), Van Reed embezzled their tuition and travel expenses. Furthermore, Van Reed's parents, who were Takahashi's host family, deceived him into signing an indenture contract and sold him to the Brown family in Oakland as a slave.

In 1868, Van Reed had made an agreement with the Shogunate Government to bring Japanese immigrants to Hawaii, but the new Meiji Government did not approve of their emigration. Van Reed nevertheless sent 148 Japanese immigrants to Hawaii, who are now called the Gannenmono. Mistreatment of these immigrants resulted in a freeze on Japanese emigration until 1885.

In 1871, with the help of Robert B. Van Valkenburgh, who was staying in Japan at that time, Van Reed successfully concluded the bilateral treaty between Hawaii and Japan, and remained in Japan as Hawaii's consul general.

In 1873, Van Reed got sick and died on February 2, 1873, on a ship to San Francisco. He was buried in the Masonic Cemetery in San Francisco.

== See also ==
- Japanese in Hawaii § Gannenmono
- Meiji Restoration
