= Álvares Machado =

Municipality in the state of São Paulo in Brazil

- Municipality
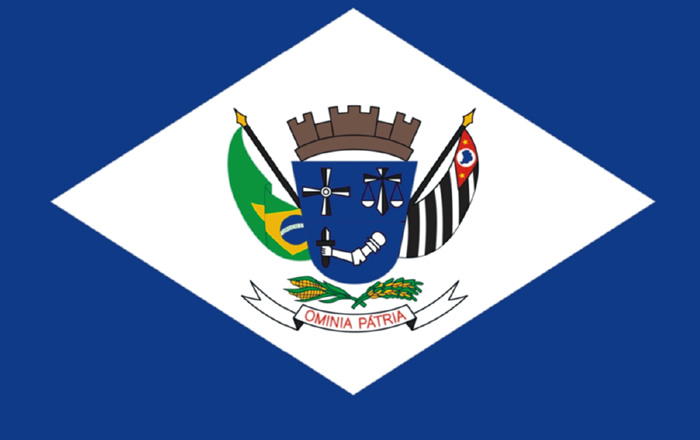
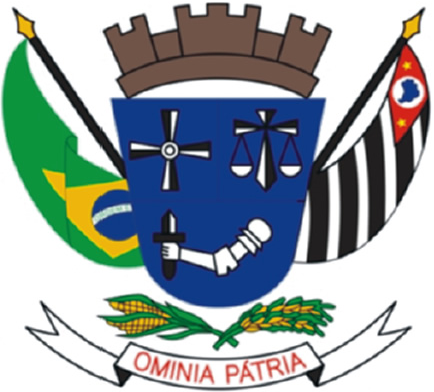
- Flag Coat of arms

- Location in São Paulo state

- Location in Brazil
- Coordinates: 22°4′28″S 51°28′24″W
- Country: Brazil
- Region: Southeast
- State: São Paulo

Area
  - Total: 348 km^{2} (134 sq mi)

Population (2020)
  - Total: 24,998
  - Density: 71.8/km^{2} (186/sq mi)
- Time zone: UTC−3 (BRT)

Álvares Machado is a municipality in the state of São Paulo in Brazil. The population is 24,998 (2020 est.) in an area of 348 km^{2}.

== History ==
The municipality was created by state law in 1944.

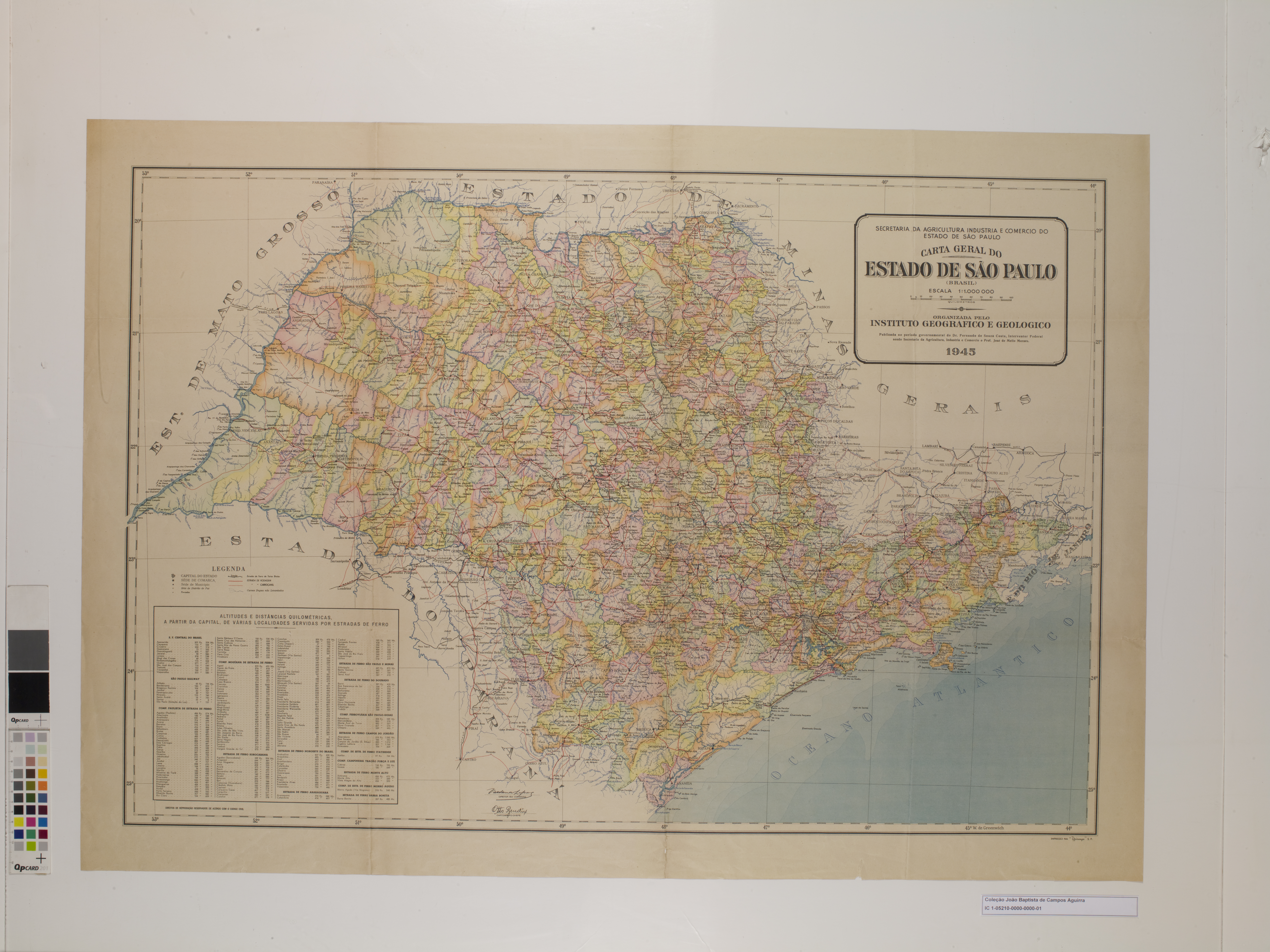
Map of the state of São Paulo (1944).

== Demographics ==
Historical population (municipality)
Year	Population	%±
1950	17,316	—
1960	19,387	12.0%
1970	17,305	−10.7%
1980	14,653	−15.3%
1991	18,865	28.7%
2000	22,661	20.1%
2010	23,513	3.8%
2022	27,255	15.9%

== Media ==
In telecommunications, the city was served by Telecomunicações de São Paulo. In July 1998, this company was acquired by Telefónica, which adopted the Vivo brand in 2012.

The company is currently an operator of cell phones, fixed lines, internet (fiber optics/4G) and television (satellite and cable).

== Religion ==
Christianity is present in the city as follows:

=== Catholic Church ===
The Catholic church in the municipality is part of the Roman Catholic Diocese of Presidente Prudente.

=== Protestant Church ===
The most diverse evangelical beliefs are present in the city, mainly Pentecostal, including the Assemblies of God in Brazil (the largest evangelical church in the country), Christian Congregation in Brazil, among others. These denominations are growing more and more throughout Brazil.

== See also ==
- List of municipalities in São Paulo
- Interior of São Paulo
