= Edo period =

Japanese history from 1600 to 1868

The Edo period, (Note: Edo jidai (江戸時代; Japanese pronunciation: [e.do (d)ʑiꜜ.dai])) also known as the Tokugawa period, (Note: Tokugawa jidai (徳川時代; [to.kɯ.ɡa.wa (d)ʑiꜜ.dai, -ŋa.wa-])) is the period between 1600 or 1603 and 1868 in the history of Japan, when the country was under the rule of the Tokugawa shogunate and some 300 regional daimyo, or feudal lords. Emerging from the chaos of the Sengoku period, the Edo period was characterized by prolonged peace and stability, urbanization and economic growth, strict social order, isolationist foreign policies, and popular enjoyment of arts and culture.

In 1600, Tokugawa Ieyasu prevailed at the Battle of Sekigahara and established hegemony over most of Japan, and in 1603 was given the title shogun by Emperor Go-Yōzei. Ieyasu resigned two years later in favor of his son Hidetada, but maintained power, and defeated the primary rival to his authority, Toyotomi Hideyori, at the Siege of Osaka in 1615 before his death the next year. Peace generally prevailed from this point on, making samurai largely redundant. The Tokugawa shogunate continued Ieyasu's policies of conformity, including a formalization of social classes in a strict hierarchy. From 1635, daimyō had to spend alternating years in the capital Edo, where their family was required to reside permanently, in a system of "alternate attendance" in order to keep the daimyō in check. By 1639, all foreigners were expelled under the policy of sakoku, with the exception of Dutch traders on the island of Dejima in Nagasaki, beginning a period of isolation.

During the Edo period, merchants greatly prospered, and laid the foundation for Japan's later zaibatsu business conglomerates. Despite general restrictions on travel within the country, daimyō processions to and from Edo developed a network of roads and inns. A commoner culture emerged in Edo and cities such as Ōsaka and Kyōto, and art forms such as kabuki and ukiyo-e flourished. Japanese scholars developed schools of neo-Confucian philosophy, and samurai, now mostly employed as administrators, formalized their bushido code of morality. In 1853, Japan was forcibly opened to Western trade by United States Commodore Matthew C. Perry, beginning the Bakumatsu ("end of the bakufu") era. The Edo period came to an end in 1868 with the Meiji Restoration and the Boshin War, which restored imperial rule to Japan.

== Establishment of the shogunate ==
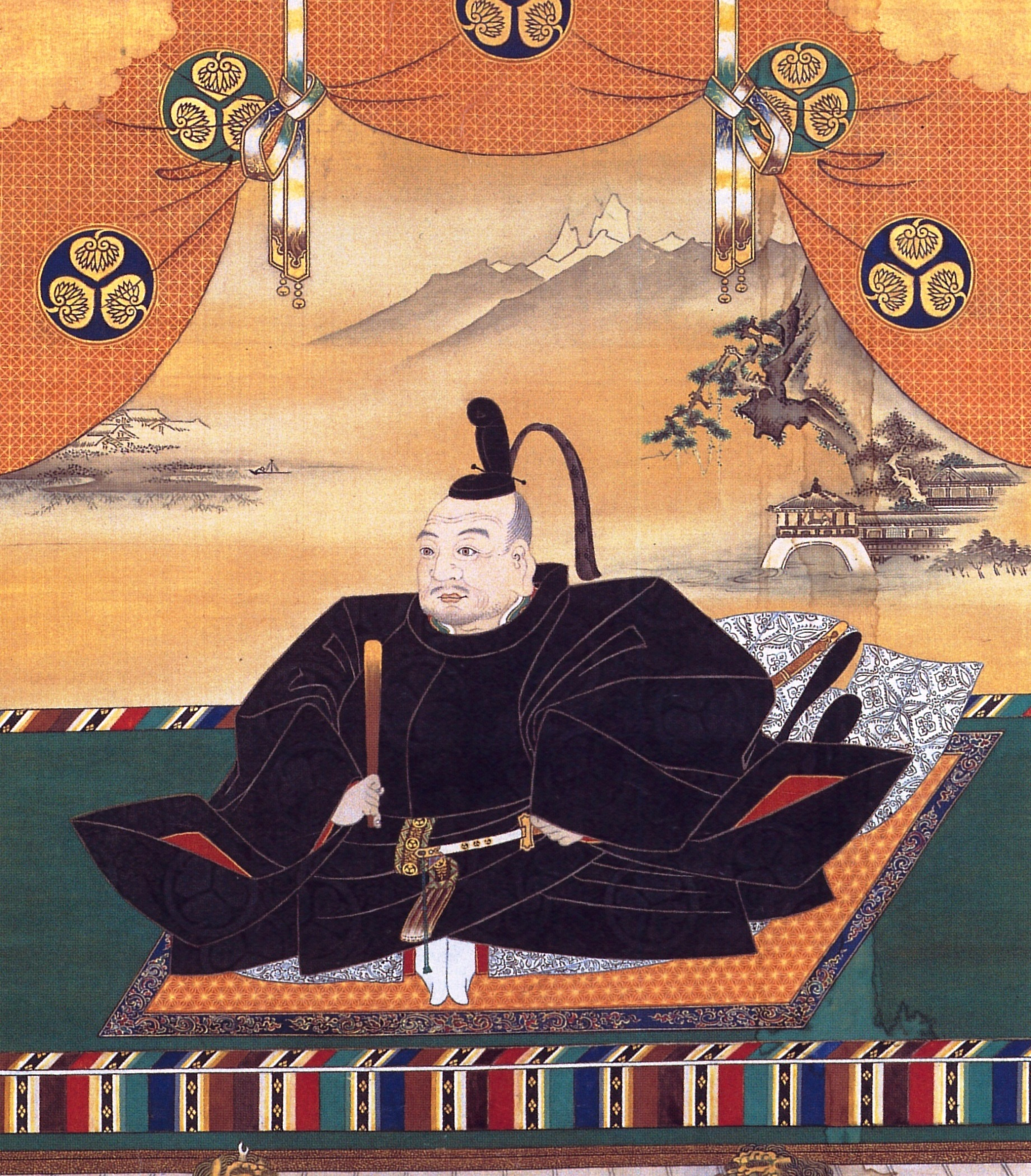
Tokugawa Ieyasu, first shōgun of the Tokugawa shogunate

A revolution took place from the time of the Kamakura shogunate, which existed with the Tennō's court, to the Tokugawa, when the samurai became the unchallenged rulers in what historian Edwin O. Reischauer called a "centralized feudal" form of the shogunate. Instrumental in the rise of the new bakufu was Tokugawa Ieyasu, the main beneficiary of the achievements of Oda Nobunaga and Toyotomi Hideyoshi. Already a powerful daimyo (feudal lord), Ieyasu profited by his transfer to the rich Kantō area. He maintained two million koku, or thirty-six hectares of land, a new headquarters at Edo, a strategically situated castle town (the future Tokyo), and also had an additional two million seven hundred thousand koku of land and thirty-eight vassals under his control. After Hideyoshi's death, Ieyasu moved quickly to seize control of the Toyotomi clan.

Ieyasu's victory over the western daimyo at the Battle of Sekigahara (21 October 1600, or in the old Japanese calendar, on the 15th day of the ninth month of the fifth year of the Keichō era) gave him control of all Japan. He rapidly abolished numerous enemy daimyo houses, reduced others, such as that of the Toyotomi, and redistributed the spoils of war to his family and allies. Ieyasu still failed to achieve complete control of the western daimyo, but his assumption of the title of shōgun helped consolidate the alliance system. After further strengthening his power base, Ieyasu installed his son Hidetada (1579–1632) as shōgun and himself as retired shōgun in 1605. The Toyotomi were still a significant threat, and Ieyasu devoted the next decade to their eradication. In 1615, the Tokugawa army destroyed the Toyotomi stronghold at Osaka.

== Governance ==
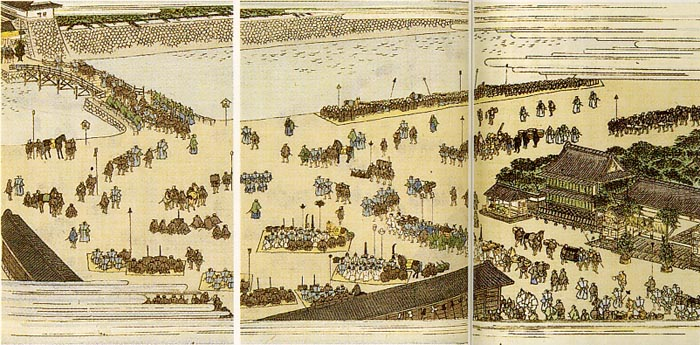
"En masse Attendance of Daimyo at Edo Castle on a Festive Day" from the Tokugawa Seiseiroku, National Museum of Japanese History

The Tokugawa (or Edo) period brought 250 years of stability to Japan. The political system evolved into what historians call bakuhan, a combination of the terms bakufu and han (domains) to describe the government and society of the period. In the Bakuhan, the Shōgun had national authority, and the Daimyo had regional authority. This represented a new unity in the feudal structure, which featured an increasingly large Bureaucracy to administer the mixture of Centralized and decentralized authorities. The Tokugawa became more powerful during their first century of rule: land redistribution gave them nearly seven million koku, control of the most important cities, and a land assessment system reaping great revenues.

The feudal hierarchy was completed by the various classes of daimyo. Closest to the Tokugawa house were the shinpan, or "related houses". There were twenty-three daimyo on the borders of Tokugawa lands, all directly related to Ieyasu. The shinpan held mostly honorary titles and advisory posts in the bakufu. The second class of the hierarchy was the fudai, or "house daimyo", rewarded with lands close to the Tokugawa holdings for their faithful service. By the 18th century, 145 fudai controlled much smaller han, the greatest assessed at 250,000 koku.

Members of the fudai class staffed most of the major bakufu offices. Ninety-seven han formed the third group, the tozama (outside vassals), former opponents or new allies. The tozama were located mostly on the peripheries of the archipelago and collectively controlled nearly ten million koku of productive land. Because the tozama were the least trusted of the daimyo, they were the most cautiously managed and generously treated, although they were excluded from central government positions.

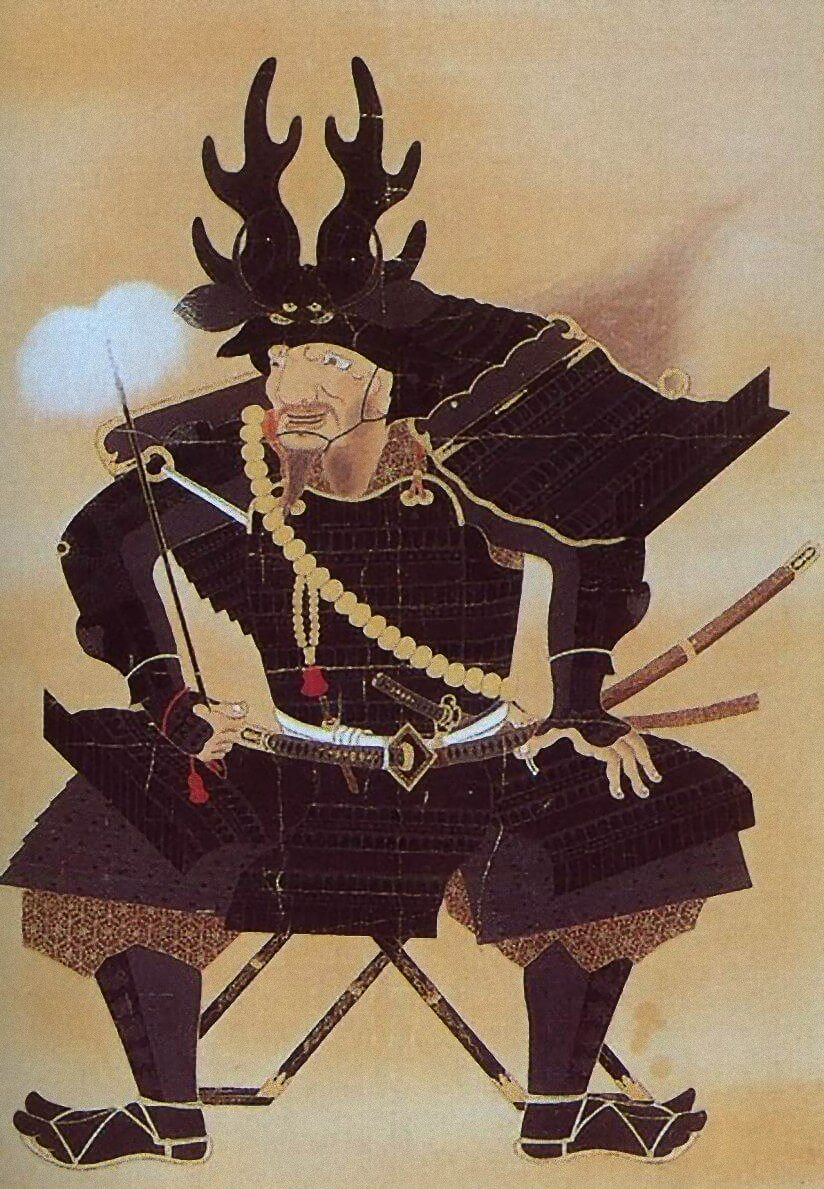
Honda Tadakatsu, a famous fudai daimyō of the early Edo period.

The Tokugawa shogunate not only consolidated their control over a reunified Japan, but also had unprecedented power over the emperor, the court, all daimyo, and the religious orders. The emperor was held up as the ultimate source of political sanction for the shōgun, who ostensibly was the vassal of the imperial family. The Tokugawa helped the imperial family recapture its old glory by rebuilding its palaces and granting it new lands. The Kinchū narabi ni kuge shohatto (Regulations for the Court and Nobility) restricted the Emperor and aristocrats to purely cultural, ritual, and scholarly pursuits. To ensure a close tie between the imperial clan and the Tokugawa family, Ieyasu's granddaughter was made an imperial consort in 1619.

The Shogunate was supported by a professional bureaucracy of roughly 17,000 officials. At the top of this hierarchy sat the Rōjū (Senior Councilors), a council that rotated monthly duties to direct foreign policy, manage relations with the lords, and oversee national security. They were supported by the Wakadoshiyori (Junior Councilors), who supervised the Shogun’s direct vassals. Specific administrative sectors—such as finance, religious affairs, or the management of major cities like Edo, Kyoto, and Nagasaki—were the responsibility of officials known as Bugyō (Commissioners). To maintain order and detect dissent, the Metsuke (Inspectors) operated as an internal intelligence network. The Hyōjōsho (Supreme Court) served as the highest judicial body for disputes between domains.

Historians refer to the Tokugawa system as "parcellized sovereignty" because there was no unified national treasury, national tax code, or national judiciary. Instead, it operated as a network of reciprocal duties known as yaku: the Shogunate provided security and peace, while the domains offered loyalty and service when required. A code of laws (Buke shohatto) was established to regulate the daimyo houses. The code encompassed private conduct, marriage, dress, types of weapons, and numbers of troops allowed; required feudal lords to reside in Edo every other year (the sankin-kōtai system); prohibited the construction of ocean-going ships; restricted castles to one per domain (han) and stipulated that bakufu regulations were the national law. Although the daimyo were not taxed per se, they were regularly levied for contributions to military and logistical support and for public works projects such as castles, roads, bridges, and palaces. A domain's status and military obligations were determined by its kokudaka—an objective measure of its assessed rice productivity in koku (approx. 5 bushels). A lord required a minimum of 10,000 koku to be recognized as a daimyo.

The various regulations and levies not only strengthened the Tokugawa but also depleted the wealth of the daimyo, thus weakening their threat to the central administration. The han, once military-centered domains, became mere local administrative units. While the Shogun exercised hegemonic control over the nation, the daimyo had full administrative control over their territory and their complex systems of retainers, bureaucrats, and commoners. Large domains like Tosa or Satsuma were nearly independent states with their own armies, legal codes, tax systems and paper currency within their borders. Residents often thought of their domain as a "country" (kuni) and could not easily conceive of a hierarchy of authority extending beyond their own lord. The autonomy of the han extended even into the capital. Daimyo estates (yashiki) in Edo functioned as extensions of the home province; the lord's retainers and people were subject only to his jurisdiction, and some large estates even maintained their own prisons.

=== Sankin-kōtai ===
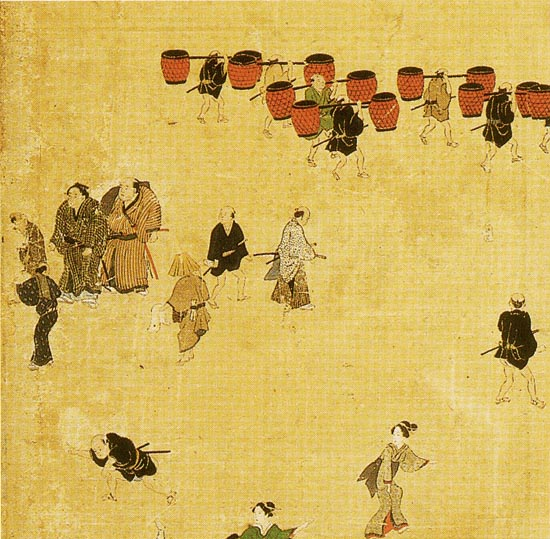
"Folding Screen Depicting Scenes of the Attendance of Daimyo at Edo Castle". National Museum of Japanese History.

Originally a voluntary practice to show loyalty after the Battle of Sekigahara, the sankin-kōtai system was formalized and made compulsory for all daimyō by Shogun Iemitsu in 1635. It required approximately 260 feudal lords to spend alternate years in residence at the shogun’s capital in Edo. While the daimyō returned to their home domains, their wives and heirs were forced to remain in Edo permanently as "hostages," ensuring the lords' compliance with shogunal authority. To manage this, daimyō were granted spacious estates (yashiki) in Edo appropriate to their status.

Domains were forced to fund parallel administrative structures: one for the home territory and another for the sprawling estates in Edo. Moving a lord's grand entourage across the country was extraordinarily costly. A lord from a domain like Tosa might travel with nearly 3,000 retainers, hundreds of horses, and dozens of boats. Economic burdens were further increased by the mandatory exchange of expensive gifts. Daimyō were required to present "duty offerings" to shogunal officials upon arrival in Edo and on various fixed occasions, with the quality of gifts strictly monitored to match the status of the house.

To acquire cash for their journeys and capital stays, domains shipped their surplus tax rice and local specialties to Osaka, which became the national commodity market. This led to the development of a complex financial system in Osaka, featuring futures markets and commodity shares. Domains employed professional warehouse managers (kuramoto) to manage sales and often had to borrow heavily from wealthy merchant houses, sometimes mortgaging future tax revenues to cover current Edo expenses. In a desperate attempt to meet the crushing costs of the Edo system, many domains turned to policies of provincial mercantilism: they encouraged the production of exportable "national" products — such as ceramics in Saga, lacquer in Kaga, or sugar in Satsuma — while strictly limiting imports from other regions to keep currency within their own borders.

== Foreign relations and trade ==
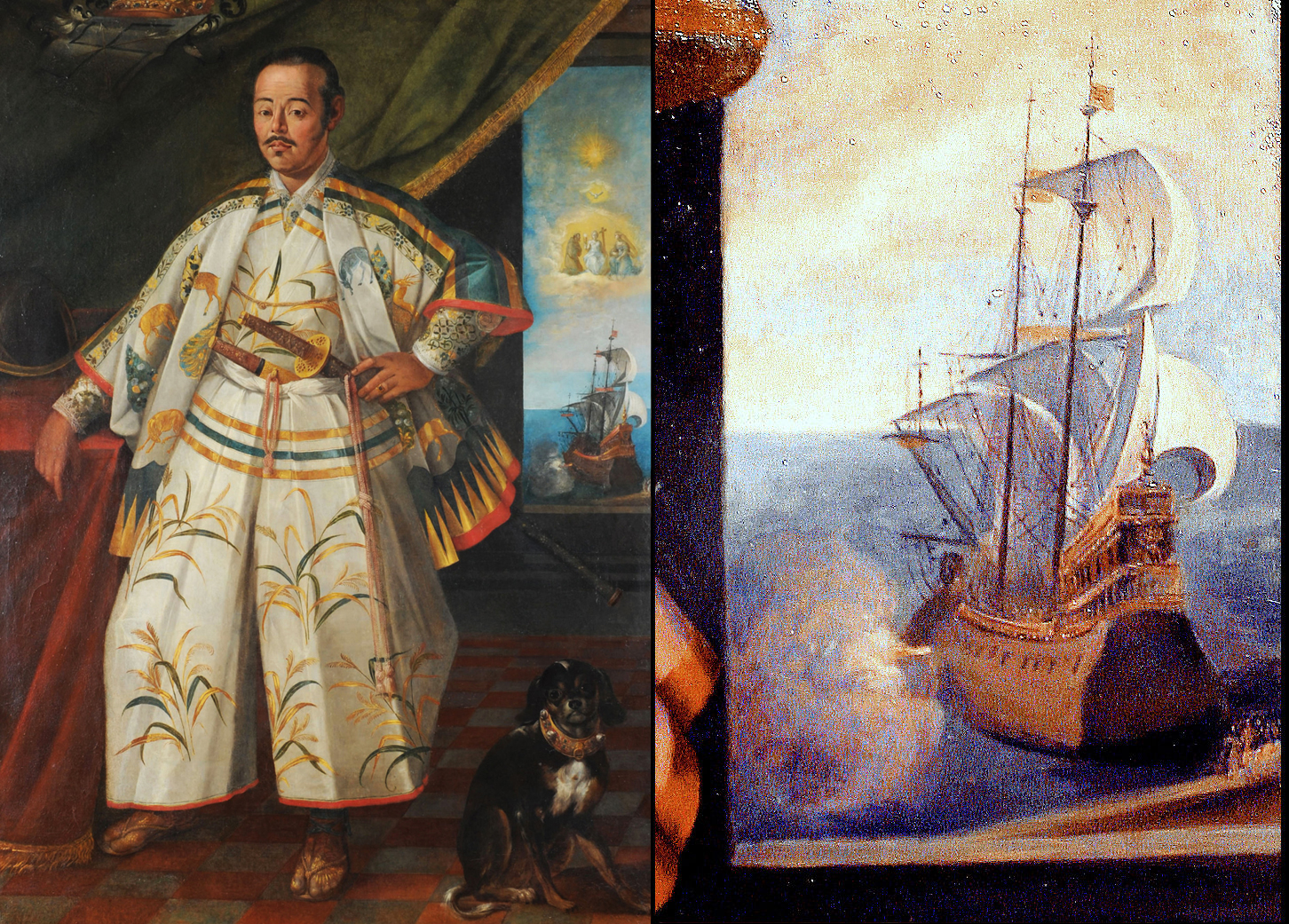
The San Juan Bautista is represented in Claude Deruet's painting of Hasekura Tsunenaga in Rome in 1617, as a galleon with Hasekura's flag (red manji on orange background) on the top mast.

=== The early phase ===
Initially, Japan was an active participant in global trade. Under the leadership of Toyotomi Hideyoshi, the government sought to replace the era of chaotic piracy (wakō) with a structured, profitable system of organized trade. To bring order to maritime relations, Hideyoshi inaugurated the Vermilion Seal permits (shuinjō) in 1592, a practice Tokugawa Ieyasu continued and expanded. During this period, Japanese trading ships reached as far as Taiwan, Macao, Manila, and the Thai capital of Ayuthia, leading to the rise of "Japantowns" across the region.

Ieyasu granted broad trading rights to the Dutch in 1609 and the English in 1613. He employed the Englishman William Adams as an advisor and use his knowledge to break the monopoly on international information previously held by Iberian missionaries. Like Hideyoshi, Ieyasu encouraged foreign trade but also was suspicious of outsiders. He wanted to make Edo a major port, but once he learned that the Europeans favoured ports in Kyūshū and that China had rejected his plans for official trade, he moved to control existing trade and allowed only certain ports to handle specific kinds of commodities.

The beginning of the Edo period coincides with the last decades of the Nanban trade period during which intense interaction with European powers, on the economic and religious plane, took place. It is at the beginning of the Edo period that Japan built its first ocean-going warships, such as the San Juan Bautista, a 500-ton galleon-type ship that transported a Japanese embassy headed by Hasekura Tsunenaga to the Americas and then to Europe. Also during that period, the bakufu commissioned around 720 Red Seal Ships, three-masted and armed trade ships, for intra-Asian commerce. Japanese adventurers, such as Yamada Nagamasa, used those ships throughout Asia.

=== Sakoku ===
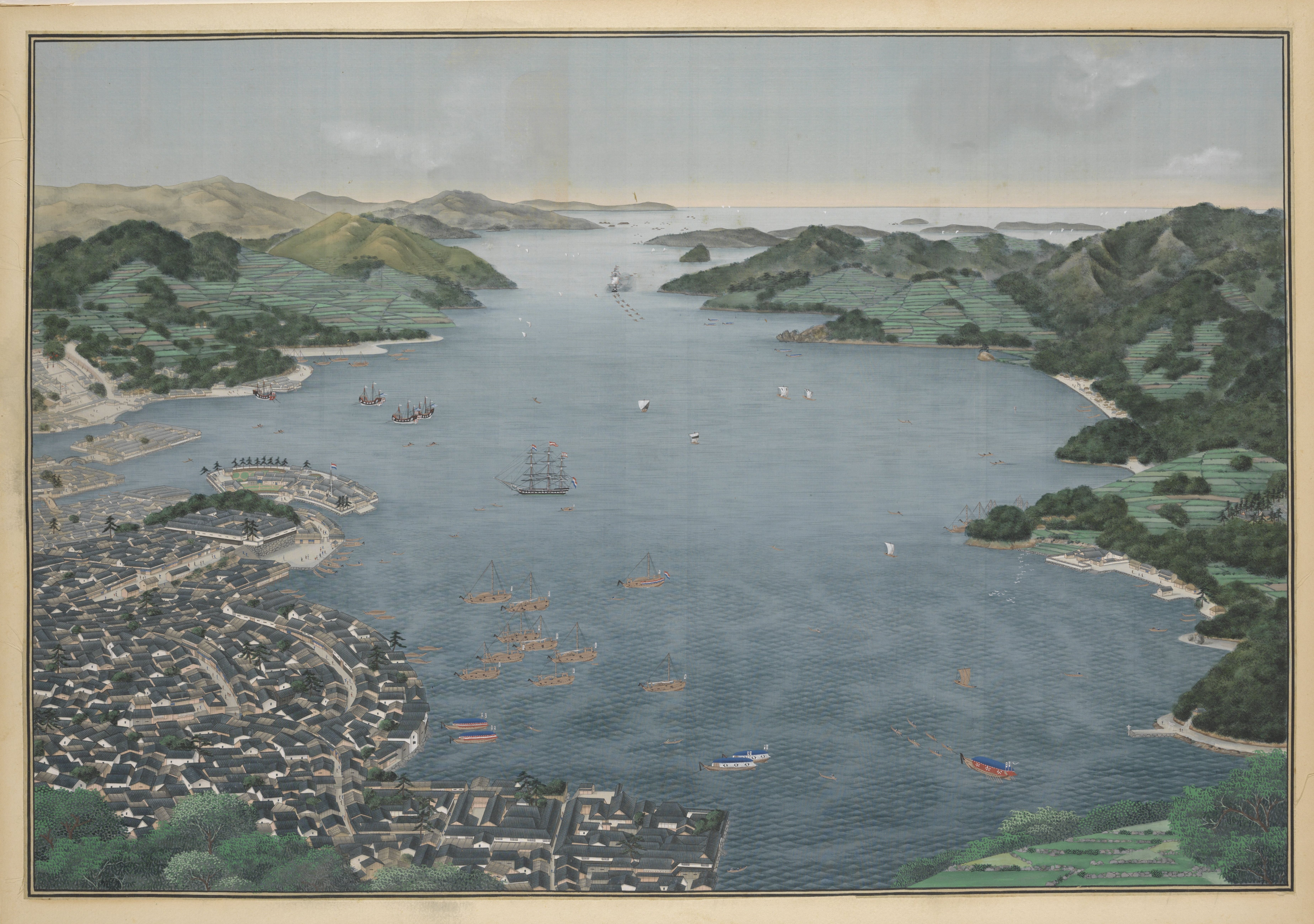
A bird's-eye view of Nagasaki Bay, with the Dejima foreign trading post island at mid-left (1833)

Itinerary and dates of the travels of Hasekura Tsunenaga. Prior to Panama Canal, caravans carried goods across Central America.

Following Ieyasu’s death in 1616, the administrations of Shoguns Hidetada and Iemitsu began to curtail foreign activities. The Shogunate sought to monopolize foreign trade, and by 1631, maritime permits were restricted to a small circle of families closely tied to the Tokugawa house. In 1633, the Shogunate prohibited Japanese vessels from traveling abroad without special certification. Finally, the Closed Country Edict of 1635 prohibited any Japanese from travelling outside Japan or, if someone left, from ever returning. In 1636, the Dutch were restricted to the small artificial island of Dejima – and thus, not Japanese soil – with only a few traders disembarking under a regulated policy of distrust and scrutiny. The final stage of isolation followed the Shimabara Rebellion (1637), an uprising the Shogunate blamed on Christian influence. This led to the 1639 edict which completely expelled the Portuguese from Japanese soil.

All Japanese subjects were ordered to register at a Buddhist or Shinto temple under the danka system. The Dutch and Chinese were restricted, respectively, to Dejima and to a special quarter in Nagasaki. Besides limited trade by some outer daimyō with Korea and the Ryukyu Islands to the southwest of Japan’s main islands, foreign contact was, by 1641, restricted to Nagasaki under the policy of sakoku.

The most immediate and explicitly stated motivation for sakoku was the perceived threat of Christianity. The shogunate viewed the religion as a "pernicious doctrine" (jaho) that undermined the social and political foundations of the Neo-Confucian and feudal order. By controlling all foreign relations and trade, the shogun also prevented regional daimyo from acquiring independent wealth, firearms, or foreign alliances that could challenge Tokugawa hegemony. Furthermore, relative isolation forced the Japanese to rely on their own resources. This stimulated domestic production, particularly in raw silk, which had previously been a major Chinese import.

The word sakoku (鎖国) was not used by the Tokugawa shogunate itself. It was coined in 1801 by the Nagasaki interpreter Shizuki Tadao while translating a work by the German physician Engelbert Kaempfer. During the Edo period, the Bakufu referred to these policies as kaikin (海禁 maritime prohibitions), etymologically identical to the haijin policies of China during much of the Ming dynasty and early Qing dynasty. There is a common assumption that reducing the number of trading partners led to a proportional drop in the volume of trade. Historical records suggest the opposite: the Bakufu actually ordered the Dutch, the Tsushima domain, and the Satsuma domain to increase their trade to compensate for the expulsion of the Portuguese. During the early years of the sakoku regulations, the volume of trade by Dutch and Chinese ships actually increased sharply.

=== Relations with other countries ===
==== Korea ====
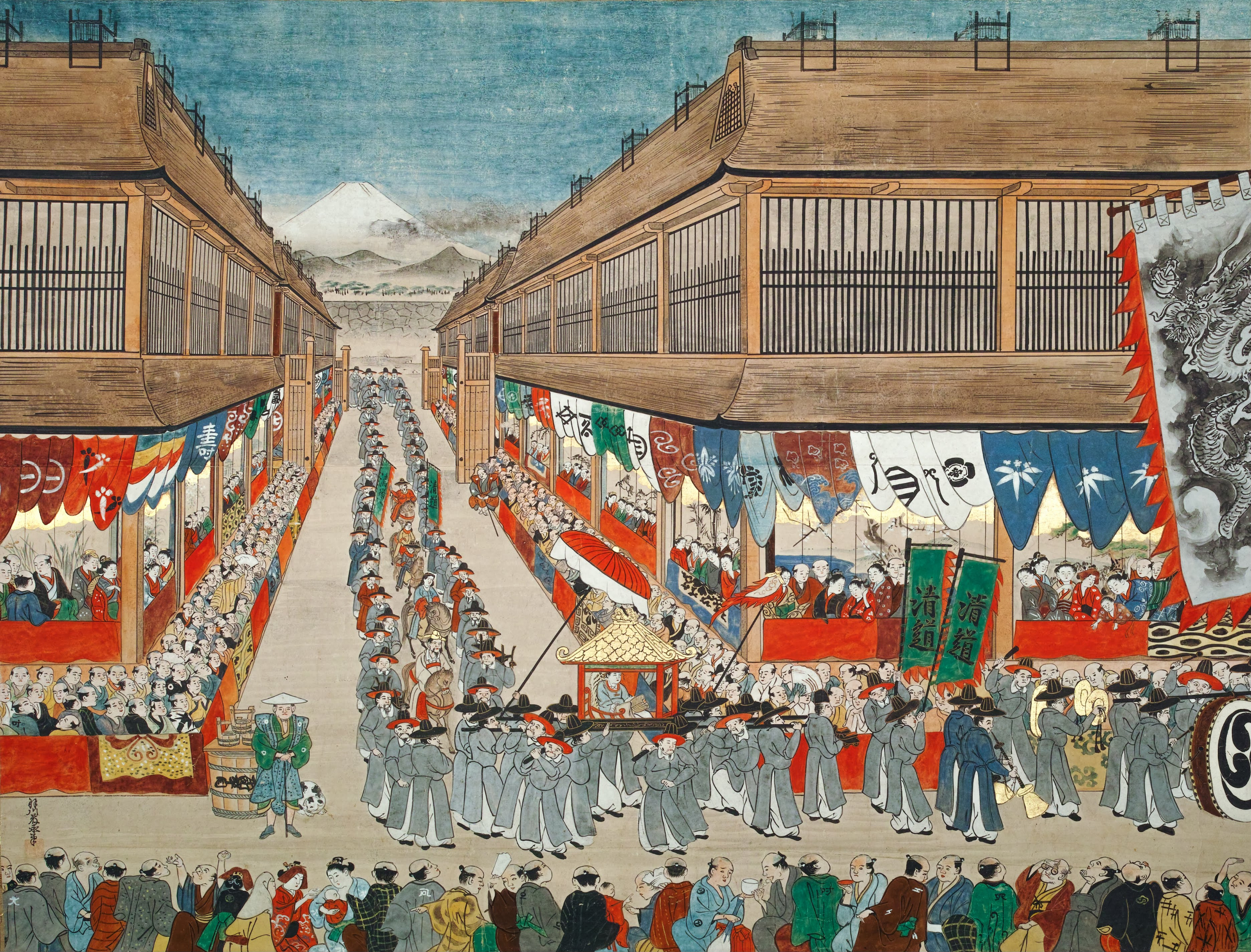
Chōsen_Tsūshin-shi_Raichō-zu(朝鮮通信使來朝圖) by Hanegawa Tōei(羽川藤永), c. 1748, a 'Chōsen-jin Uki-e(朝鮮人浮絵)' that depicts a Joseon diplomatic procession through the streets of Edo in 1748.Kobe City Museum

Following the disastrous invasions of Korea by Toyotomi Hideyoshi in the 1590s, Tokugawa Ieyasu sought to normalize diplomatic relations with the Joseon court. Peace was formally restored in 1605, and two years later, a Korean mission of over 500 men traveled to Japan to honor the accession of the second shogun, Hidetada. These negotiations culminated in the Treaty of Kiyu (1609). Under the provisions of the treaty, Japanese trade was restricted to the single port of Pusan — a significant reduction from the three ports previously open to Japanese merchants. Within Pusan, Japanese residents were confined to a designated quarter known as the wakan, where they lived under close supervision in conditions comparable to the Dutch and Chinese enclaves at Nagasaki. The Tokugawa bakufu delegated the practical management of Korean relations to its vassal, the Sō family, daimyo of Tsushima, for whom this monopoly over Korean trade was indispensable to the domain's economic survival.

Throughout the Edo period, twelve major Korean embassies, known as tsūshinshi, traveled to Japan, most timed to celebrate the accession of a new shogun.

==== China ====
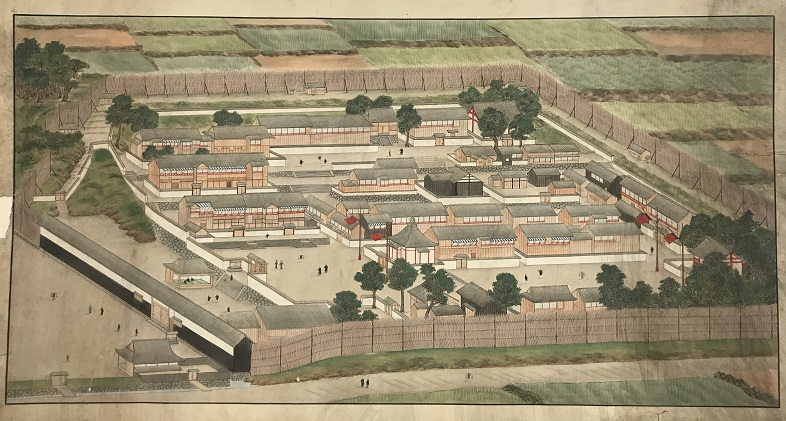
Chinese quarter In Nagasaki around 1825

Early in the Tokugawa period, discussions were held about establishing official trade with the Ming dynasty, but these efforts foundered on the Chinese court's insistence that Japan participate in the tributary system — a condition the bakufu found unacceptable. The Tokugawa shogunate deliberately avoided formal political ties with the Ming and later Qing dynasty because it was unwilling to acknowledge a subordinate status in the Chinese world system; the title "King of Japan" (Nihon kokuo) was viewed as redolent of the language of enfeoffment used by Chinese emperors and was replaced by "Sovereign Lord of Japan" (Nihonkoku Taikun). Under the Tokugawa order, China was reclassified (alongside the Netherlands) as a "trading country" (tsusho) rather than a diplomatic partner (tsushin). This meant that while trade flourished at Nagasaki, there were no formal state-to-state diplomatic missions exchanged with the Chinese court.

While the Dutch were confined to the small artificial island of Deshima, the Chinese were more numerous and eventually restricted to a much larger walled enclave known as the tōjin yashiki (Chinese quarter) established in Nagasaki in 1689. At its peak in 1688, nearly 200 Chinese ships visited Nagasaki, and the quarter housed thousands of residents. Historians note that the Nagasaki trade was essentially a "China trade," as Chinese merchants brought far more goods—particularly silk and books—than the Dutch East India Company.

Chinese scholars, artists, and monks were still treated with considerable deference by the Japanese elite. Chinese monks were permitted to establish branches of their temples in Nagasaki, and the Ōbaku school of Rinzai Zen was introduced to Japan by figures such as Ingen, who received patronage from both the shogun and the imperial court. Approximately 130 Chinese painters visited Nagasaki during the Edo period; the most accomplished among them, such as Shen Nanpin, introduced Ming and Qing painting styles that profoundly influenced the development of Japanese nanga and bunjinga traditions.

==== Ryukyu ====
In 1609, with the explicit knowledge and authorization of the Tokugawa bakufu, the Satsuma domain launched a military expedition to seize control of the Ryukyu islands. Satsuma disarmed the inhabitants and installed a shadow government that maintained the Okinawan ruler in his capital. The most critical aspect of this conquest was that it was kept secret from China. Satsuma and the bakufu forced Ryukyu to maintain its traditional tributary relationship with China under the guise of being an independent kingdom. This allowed Japan to bypass Ming and later Qing trade restrictions, as Satsuma used Ryukyu as a conduit to gain access to highly prized Chinese goods.

On the state-to-state level, the Tokugawa shogunate used Ryukyu to bolster its own domestic and regional prestige. Whenever a new shogun was installed, Ryukyu embassies were paraded through the streets of Edo. In official (though often rejected) correspondence with Chinese provincial authorities between 1611 and 1625, the bakufu explicitly asserted that the Ryukyuan king was Japan's vassal.

==== The West ====
The departure of the English, followed by the expulsion of the Spanish and Portuguese, left the Dutch as the only Europeans in Japan, restricted to the artificial island of Deshima in Nagasaki harbor. On Deshima, the Dutch lived as virtual "prisoners," strictly monitored and forbidden from crossing the bridge to the mainland without rare permission. They were also required to conceal their religious practices and Bibles. The shogunate maintained the Dutch presence primarily for intelligence. Every arriving captain was required to submit a fūsetsugaki—a report detailing world events, such as the Napoleonic Wars or the arrival of other Westerners in Asia. Periodically, the Dutch chief factor (opperhoofd) was required to travel to Edo to pay homage to the Shogun. Engelbert Kaempfer (1651–1716) was a doctor at Deshima in 1690 and accompanied the chief factor on his journey to Edo in 1691 and 1692. His account of the audience with the fifth Shogun, Tokugawa Tsunayoshi, highlights that by the late 17th century, Europeans had become "little more than exotic and amusing creatures" to the Japanese elite. Kaempfer's History of Japan, first published in English translation in 1727–1728, provides a rich storehouse of information:

We were then further commanded to put on our hats, to walk about the room discoursing with one another, to take off our perukes . . . Then I was desired once more to come nearer the skreen, and to take off my peruke. Then they made us jump, dance, play gambols and walk together, and upon that they ask’d the Ambassador how old we guessed Bingo to be, he answer’d 50 and I 45, which made them laugh. Then they made us kiss one another, like man and wife, which the ladies particularly shew’d by their laughter to be well pleas’d with. They desir’d us further to shew them what sorts of compliments it was customary in Europe to make to inferiors, to ladies, to superiors, to princes, to kings. After this they begg’d another song of me, and were satisfy’d with two, which the company seem’d to like very well. After this farce was over, we were order’d to take off our cloaks, to come near the skreen one by one, and to take our leave in the very same manner we would take it of a Prince, or King in Europe . . .

— Engelbert Kaempfer, History of Japan, trans. J. Scheuchzer (Glasgow: James MacLehose, 1906), 3:167–168

== Society ==
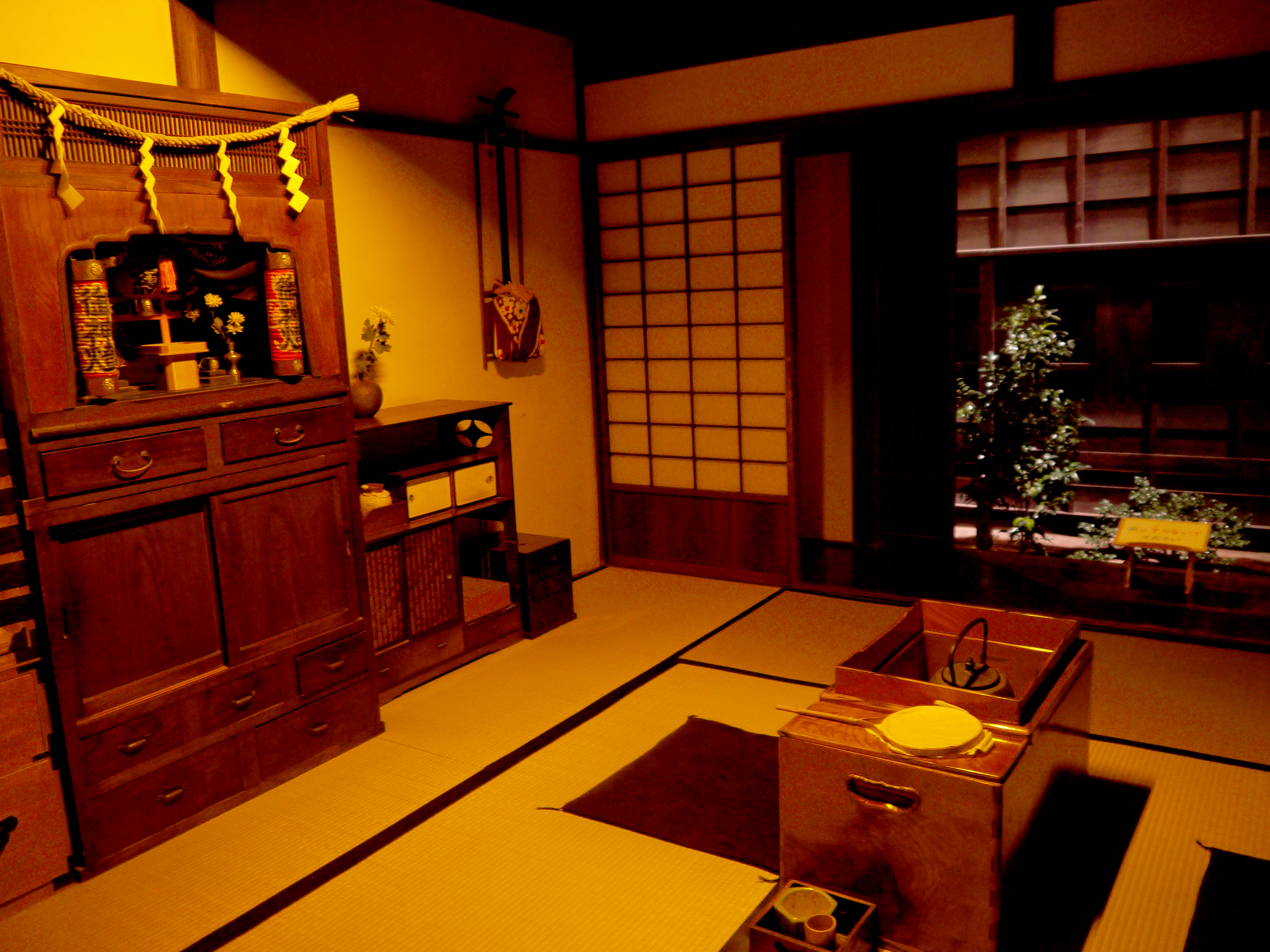
The house of the merchant Fukagawa Edo Museum

During the Tokugawa period, the social order, based on inherited position rather than personal merits, was rigid and highly formalized. At the top were the emperor and court nobles (kuge), together with the shōgun and daimyo. Older scholars believed that there were Shi-nō-kō-shō (士農工商, four classes) of "samurai, peasants (hyakushō), craftsmen, and merchants (chōnin)" under the daimyo, with 80% of peasants under the 5% samurai class, followed by craftsmen and merchants. However, various studies have revealed since about 1995 that the classes of peasants, craftsmen, and merchants under the samurai are equal, and the old hierarchy chart has been removed from Japanese history textbooks. In other words, peasants, craftsmen, and merchants are not a social pecking order, but a social classification.

Only the peasants lived in rural areas. Samurai, craftsmen and merchants lived in the cities that were built around daimyo castles, each restricted to their own quarter. Edo society had an elaborate social structure, in which every family knew its place and level of prestige.

At the top were the Emperor and the court nobility, invincible in prestige but weak in power. Next came the shōgun, daimyo and layers of feudal lords whose rank was indicated by their closeness to the Tokugawa. They had power. The daimyo comprised about 250 local lords of local "han" with annual outputs of 50,000 or more bushels of rice. The upper strata were much given to elaborate and expensive rituals, including elegant architecture, landscaped gardens, Noh drama, patronage of the arts, and the tea ceremony.

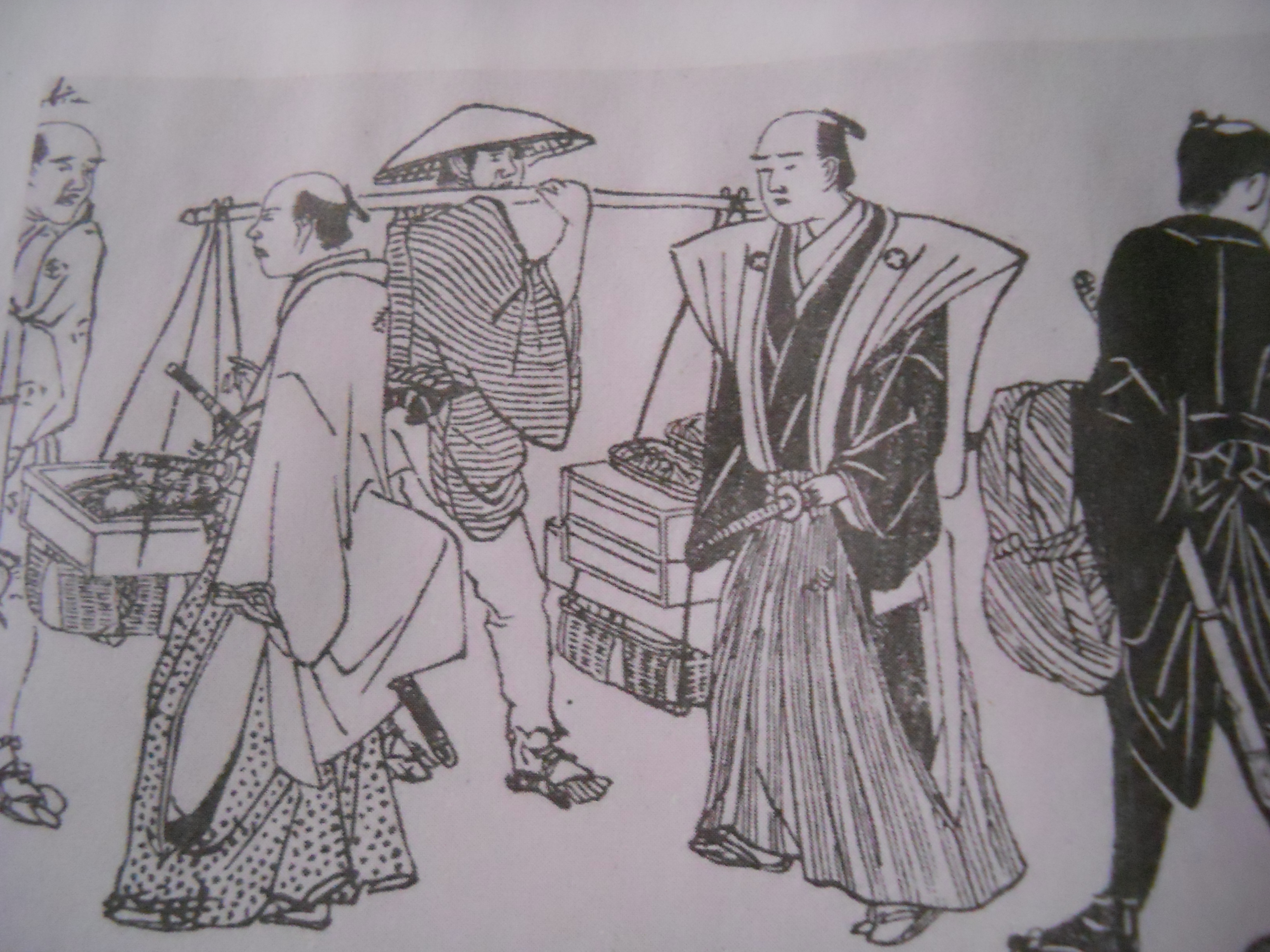
Samurai could kill a commoner for the slightest insult and were widely feared by the Japanese population. Edo period, 1798

Then came the 400,000 warriors, called "samurai", in numerous grades and degrees. A few upper samurai were eligible for high office; most were foot soldiers. Since there was very little fighting, they became civil servants paid by the daimyo, with minor duties. The samurai were affiliated with senior lords in a well-established chain of command. The shogun had 17,000 samurai retainers; the daimyo each had hundreds. Most lived in modest homes near their lord's headquarters, and lived off of hereditary rights and stipends. Together these high status groups comprised Japan's ruling class making up about 6% of the total population.

After a long period of inner conflict, the first goal of the newly established Tokugawa government was to pacify the country. It created a balance of power that remained fairly stable for the next 250 years, influenced by Confucian principles of social order. Most samurai lost their direct possession of the land: the daimyo took over their land. The samurai had a choice: give up their sword and become peasants, or move to the city of their feudal lord and become a paid retainer. Only a few land samurai remained in the border provinces of the north, or as direct vassals of the shōgun, the 5,000 so-called hatamoto. The daimyo were put under tight control of the shogunate. Their families had to reside in Edo; the daimyo themselves had to reside in Edo for one year and in their province (han) for the next. This system was called sankin-kōtai.

The peasants comprised 80% of the population, but their high prestige as producers was undercut by their burden as the chief source of taxes. They were illiterate and lived in villages controlled by appointed officials who kept the peace and collected taxes. The family was the smallest legal entity, and the maintenance of family status and privileges was of great importance at all levels of society. The individual had no separate legal rights. The 1711 Gotōke reijō was compiled from over 600 statutes promulgated between 1597 and 1696.

Outside mainstream society were the so-called eta and hinin, those whose professions broke the taboos of Buddhism. Eta were butchers, tanners and undertakers. Hinin served as town guards, street cleaners, and executioners. Other outsiders included the beggars, entertainers, and prostitutes. The word eta literally translates to "filthy" and hinin to "non-humans", a thorough reflection of the attitude held by other classes that the eta and hinin were not even people.

Hinin were only allowed inside a special quarter of the city. Other persecution of the hinin included disallowing them from wearing robes longer than knee-length and the wearing of hats. Sometimes eta villages were not even printed on official maps. A sub-class of hinin who were born into their social class had no option of mobility to a different social class whereas the other class of hinin who had lost their previous class status could be reinstated in Japanese society.

On the other hand, in practice, both eta and hinin were recognized as owners of fields, some with very large incomes (koku) and some economic power. Their chief held the title of Danzaemon (弾左衛門) and had the authority to issue orders to eta and hinin throughout the country, as well as jurisdiction within the eta and hinin.

In the 19th century the umbrella term burakumin was coined to name the eta and hinin because both classes were forced to live in separate village neighborhoods. The eta, hinin and burakumin classes were officially abolished in 1871. However, their cultural and societal impact, including some forms of discrimination, continues into modern times.

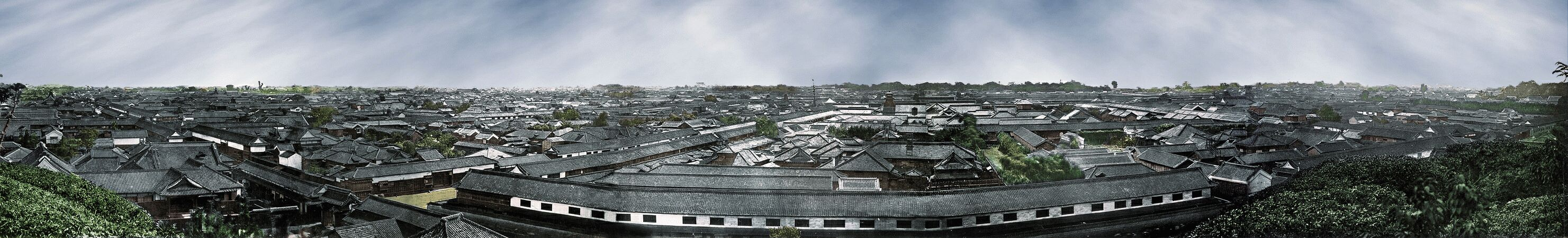
Edo, 1865 or 1866. Photochrom print. Five albumen prints joined to form a panorama. Photographer: Felice Beato.

== Economic development ==
A scaled pocket plan of Edo

The Edo period passed on a vital commercial sector in flourishing urban centers, a relatively well-educated elite, a sophisticated government bureaucracy, productive agriculture, a closely unified nation with highly developed financial and marketing systems, and a national infrastructure of roads. Economic development during the Tokugawa period included urbanization, increased shipping of commodities, a significant expansion of domestic and, initially, foreign commerce, and a diffusion of trade and handicraft industries. The construction trades flourished, along with banking facilities and merchant associations. Increasingly, han authorities oversaw the rising agricultural production and the spread of rural handicrafts.

=== Population ===
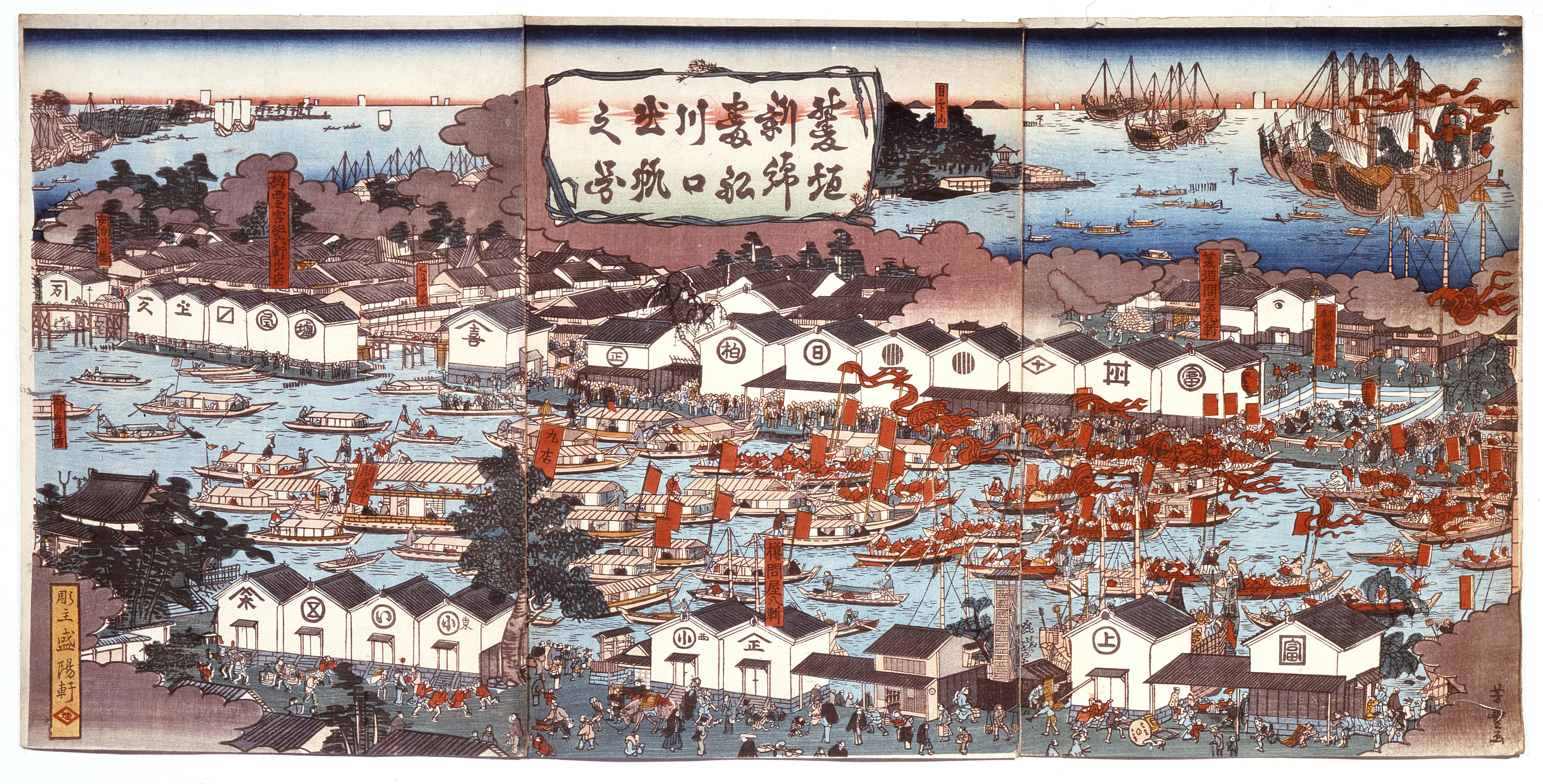
A set of three ukiyo-e prints depicting Osaka's bustling shipping industry. By Gansuitei Yoshitoyo. 1854–1859.

By the mid-18th century, Edo had a population of more than one million, likely the biggest city in the world at the time. Osaka and Kyoto each had more than 400,000 inhabitants. Many other castle towns grew as well. Osaka and Kyoto became busy trading and handicraft production centers, while Edo was the center for the supply of food and essential urban consumer goods. Around the year 1700, Japan was perhaps the most urbanized country in the world, at a rate of around 10–12%. Half of that figure would be samurai, while the other half, consisting of merchants and artisans, would be known as chōnin.

In the first part of the Edo period, Japan experienced rapid demographic growth, before leveling off at around 30 million. Between the 1720s and 1820s, Japan had almost zero population growth, often attributed to lower birth rates in response to widespread famine (Great Tenmei famine 1782–1788), but some historians have presented different theories, such as a high rate of infanticide artificially controlling population.

At around 1721, the population of Japan was close to 30 million and the figure was only around 32 million around the Meiji Restoration around 150 years later. From 1721, there were regular national surveys of the population until the end of the Tokugawa Shogunate. In addition, regional surveys, as well as religious records initially compiled to eradicate Christianity, also provide valuable demographic data.

=== Urbanization ===
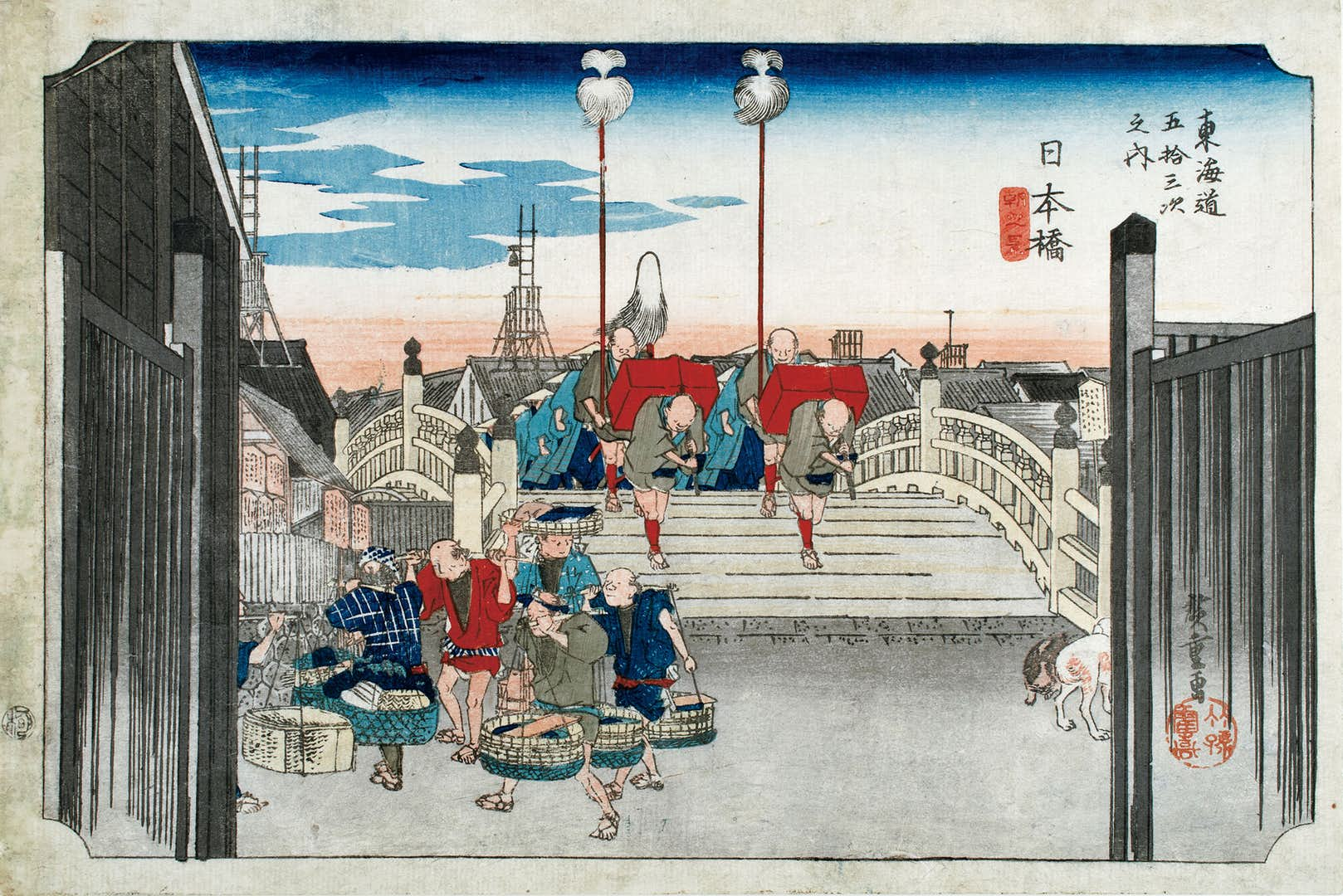
Nihonbashi in Edo, ukiyo-e print by Hiroshige

During the Edo period, Japan was transformed from a collection of fragmented fiefs into one of the most urbanized societies in the pre-modern world. By forcing the samurai class to abandon their rural holdings and reside permanently in the castle towns (jōkamachi) of their respective lords, the regime created a series of concentrated administrative and consumption centers across the archipelago. The castle towns were meticulously designed as premodern "company towns". Typically, the lord’s castle sat atop a massive stone base, serving as the town’s military and administrative anchor, while the surrounding residential areas were strictly zoned according to rank and income. In contrast, the merchant and artisan quarters were squeezed into the narrow lanes of low-lying and less desirable locations, often reclaimed from swamps or riverbanks. Beyond their military origins, the jōkamachi functioned as vital administrative and consumption centers. Because the samurai class produced nothing of material value, their concentration in these urban hubs necessitated a large service class of townsmen to provide housing, goods, and luxuries.

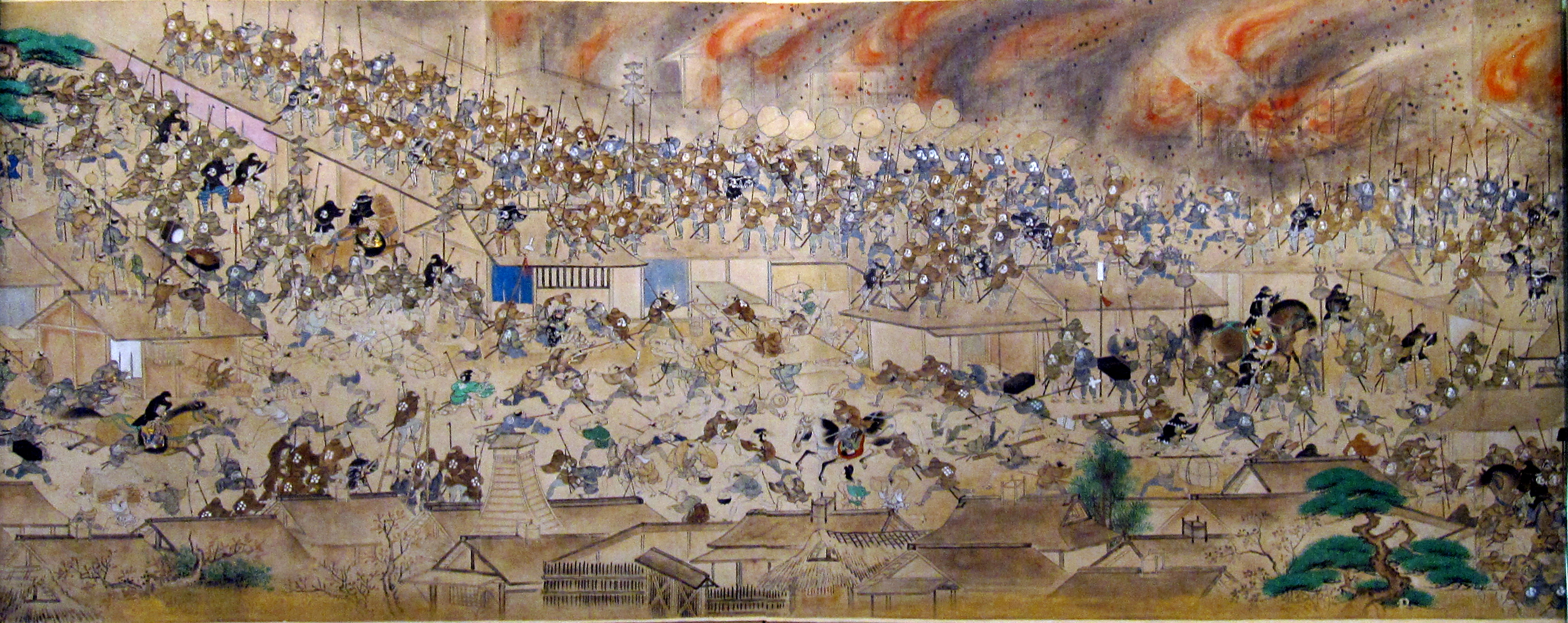
Scroll depicting the Great Fire of Meireki

At the center of the urban network was the shogun’s capital, Edo. Originally a small fortress town, Edo was transformed through massive engineering projects that leveled mountains and drained vast swamps to accommodate its rapid growth. The city's topography was dominated by the shogun's Chiyoda Castle and the walled estates (yashiki) of the feudal lords, which occupied nearly 70 percent of the urban land, leaving the burgeoning class of commoner townsmen (chōnin) to throng the narrow lanes and tenements of the "Low City" or shitamachi. This dense environment suffered from frequent and devastating fires, famously called the "flowers of Edo".

Beyond Edo, the "Three Metropolises" (santo) also included the imperial capital of Kyoto and the commercial powerhouse of Osaka. Kyoto remained the unrivaled center for the old aristocracy, religious institutions, and refined luxury crafts, while Osaka earned its title as the "Kitchen of Japan" by hosting a national rice commodity exchange that funded the lifestyle of the military elite. These major cities were knit together by the Gokaidō and coastal maritime circuits.

=== Transportation and communication networks ===
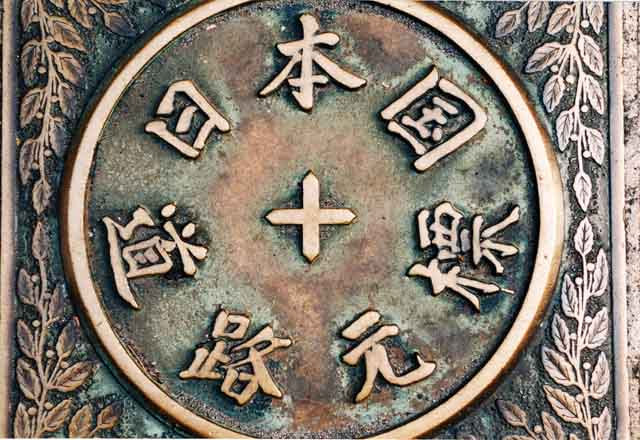
Nihonbashi's highway distance marker, marking the beginning of the five routes

The foundation of the land network was the Gokaidō, five major national highways directly managed by the bakufu. These highways were supported by a network of 248 post stations (shukuba), which functioned as essential relay centers for transport, providing horses, porters, and specialized high-class lodging known as honjin for visiting officials and lords. Supporting these stations was the sukegō system, which forced nearby "assisting villages" to provide men and horses for official processions according to their rice productivity. For security and strategic control, the shogunate established fifty-three checkpoints or sekisho concentrated around Edo to enforce a policy of "women leaving, guns entering" (de onna-iri teppō), preventing hostages from escaping or weapons from being smuggled in for rebellion.

For the dissemination of the government's will to the public, the bakufu utilized kōsatsu, wooden signboards posted at prominent locations like bridges and intersections throughout the country. These boards contained official decrees, moral exhortations, and warnings against proscribed activities like the worship of Christianity. In the eighteenth century, these boards were so ubiquitous that they served as basic texts in village parish schools, acquainting commoners everywhere with the will of the central authority. Rapid transmission of information was facilitated by hikyaku (professional runners) who carried urgent official messages and could bypass typical travel restrictions. Economic information moved through similar channels; market quotations from the national commodity exchange in Osaka were regularly dispatched across the country via fast runners and even pigeons.

While the Edo period's land-based highways were essential for the movement of people and urgent news, the transportation of bulk commodities was handled by a network of coastal maritime circuits. By the 1670s, two primary routes had become highly structured to facilitate national trade: the Western Circuit and the Eastern Circuit. The Western Circuit brought ships from northern Japan along the Japan Sea coast, navigating through the Straits of Shimonoseki to reach the great commercial hub of Osaka. Simultaneously, the Eastern Circuit served domains along the Pacific coast, channeling vital goods to the central markets.

=== Economy and financial services ===
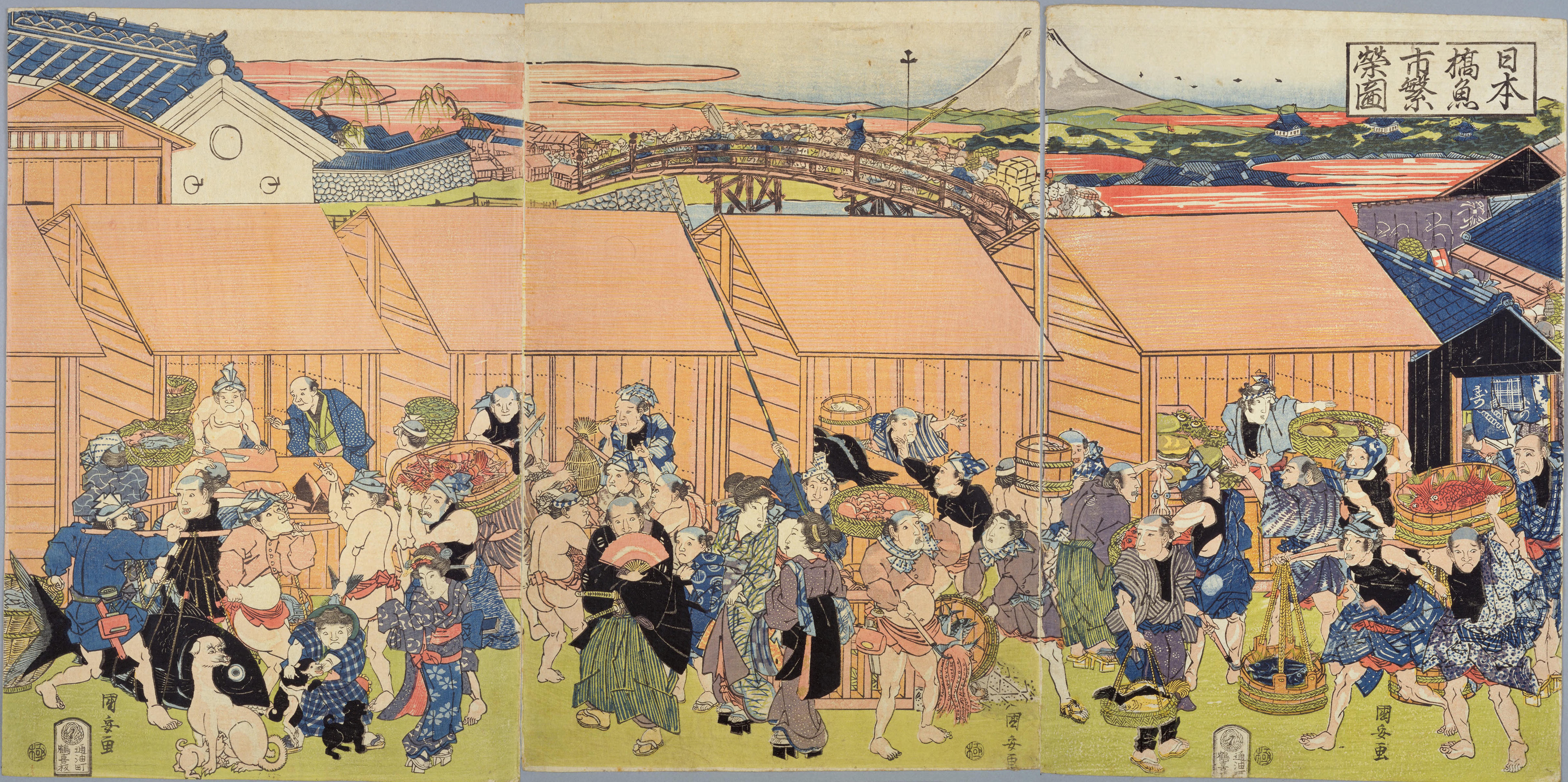
Nihonbashi Fish Market Prosperity (Edo period) by Utagawa Kuniyasu

The Tokugawa era brought peace, and that brought prosperity to a nation of 31 million, 80% of them rice farmers. Rice production increased steadily, but population remained stable. Rice paddies grew from 1.6 million chō in 1600 to 3 million by 1720. Improved technology helped farmers control the all-important flow of water to their paddies. The daimyos operated several hundred castle towns, which became loci of domestic trade.

The system of sankin kōtai meant that daimyos and their families often resided in Edo or travelled back to their domains, giving demand to an enormous consumer market in Edo and trade throughout the country. Samurai and daimyos, after prolonged peace, were accustomed to more elaborate lifestyles. To keep up with growing expenditures, the bakufu and daimyos often encouraged commercial crops and artifacts within their domains, from textiles to tea. The concentration of wealth also led to the development of financial markets.

As the shogunate only allowed daimyos to sell surplus rice in Edo and Osaka, large-scale rice markets developed there. Each daimyo also had a capital city, located near the one castle they were allowed to maintain. Daimyos had agents in various commercial centers, selling rice and cash crops, often exchanged for paper credit redeemedable elsewhere. Merchants invented credit instruments to transfer money, and currency came into common use. In the cities and towns, guilds of merchants and artisans met the growing demand for goods and services.

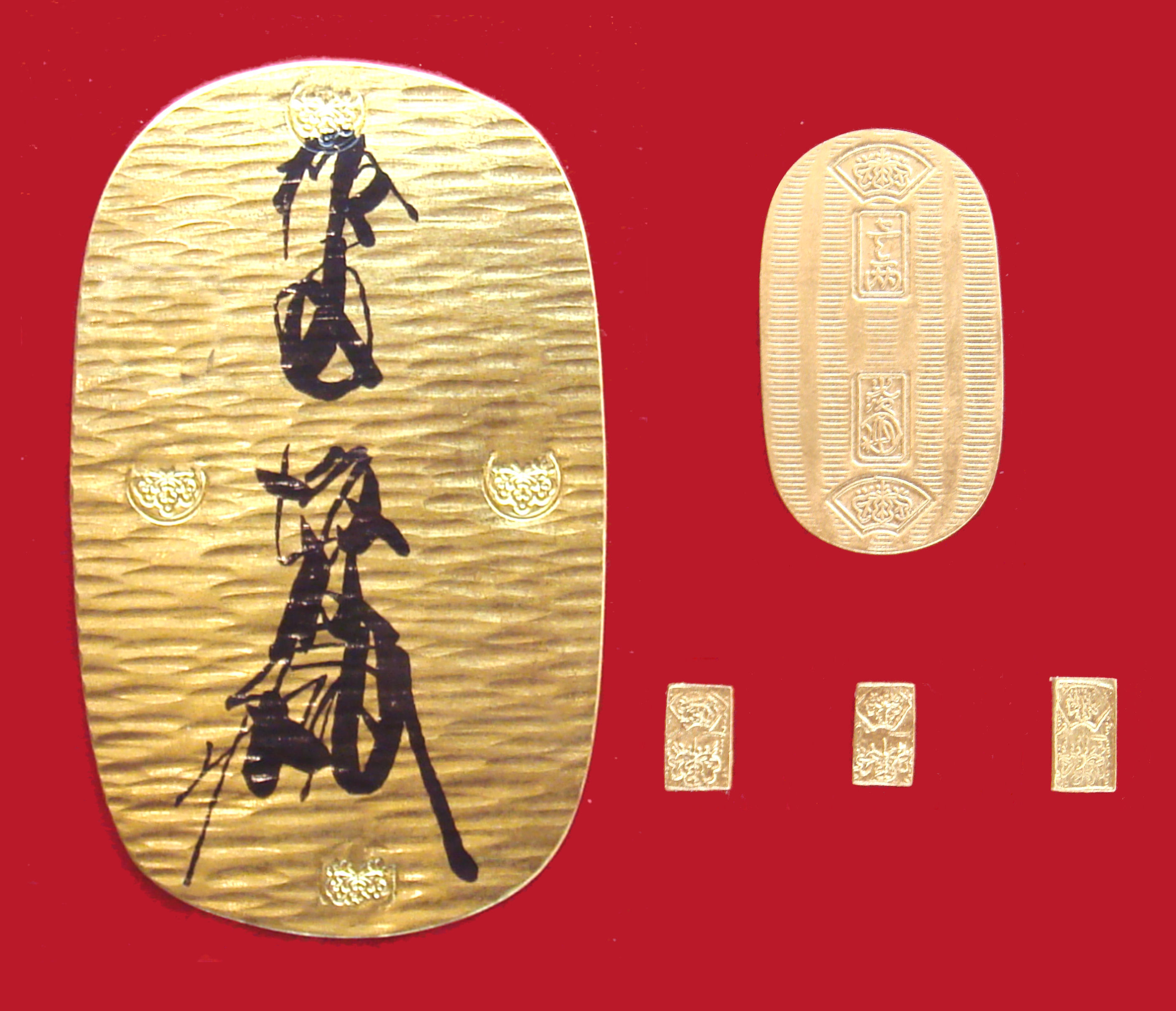
Tokugawa coinage: Ōban, Koban, Ichibuban (1601–1695).

The merchants benefited enormously, especially those with official patronage. However, the Neo-Confucian ideology of the shogunate focused the virtues of frugality and hard work; it had a rigid class system, which emphasized agriculture and despised commerce and merchants. A century after the Shogunate's establishment, problems began to emerge. The samurai, forbidden to engage in farming or business but allowed to borrow money, borrowed too much, some taking up side jobs as bodyguards for merchants, debt collectors, or artisans.

The bakufu and daimyos raised taxes on farmers, but did not tax business, so they too fell into debt, with some merchants specializing in loaning to daimyos. Yet it was inconceivable to systematically tax commerce, as it would make money off "parasitic" activities, raise the prestige of merchants, and lower the status of government. As they paid no regular taxes, the forced financial contributions to the daimyos were seen by some merchants as a cost of doing business. The wealth of merchants gave them a degree of prestige and even power over the daimyos.

By 1750, rising taxes incited peasant unrest and even revolt. The nation had to deal somehow with samurai impoverishment and treasury deficits. The financial troubles of the samurai undermined their loyalties to the system, and the empty treasury threatened the whole system of government. One solution was reactionary—cutting samurai salaries and prohibiting spending for luxuries. Other solutions were modernizing, with the goal of increasing agrarian productivity.

The eighth Tokugawa shogun, Yoshimune (in office 1716–1745) had considerable success, though much of his work had to be done again between 1787 and 1793 by the shogun's chief councilor Matsudaira Sadanobu (1759–1829). Other shoguns debased the coinage to pay debts, which caused inflation. Overall, while commerce (domestic and international) was vibrant and sophisticated financial services had developed in the Edo period, the shogunate remained ideologically focused on honest agricultural work as the basis of society and never sought to develop a mercantile or capitalistic country.

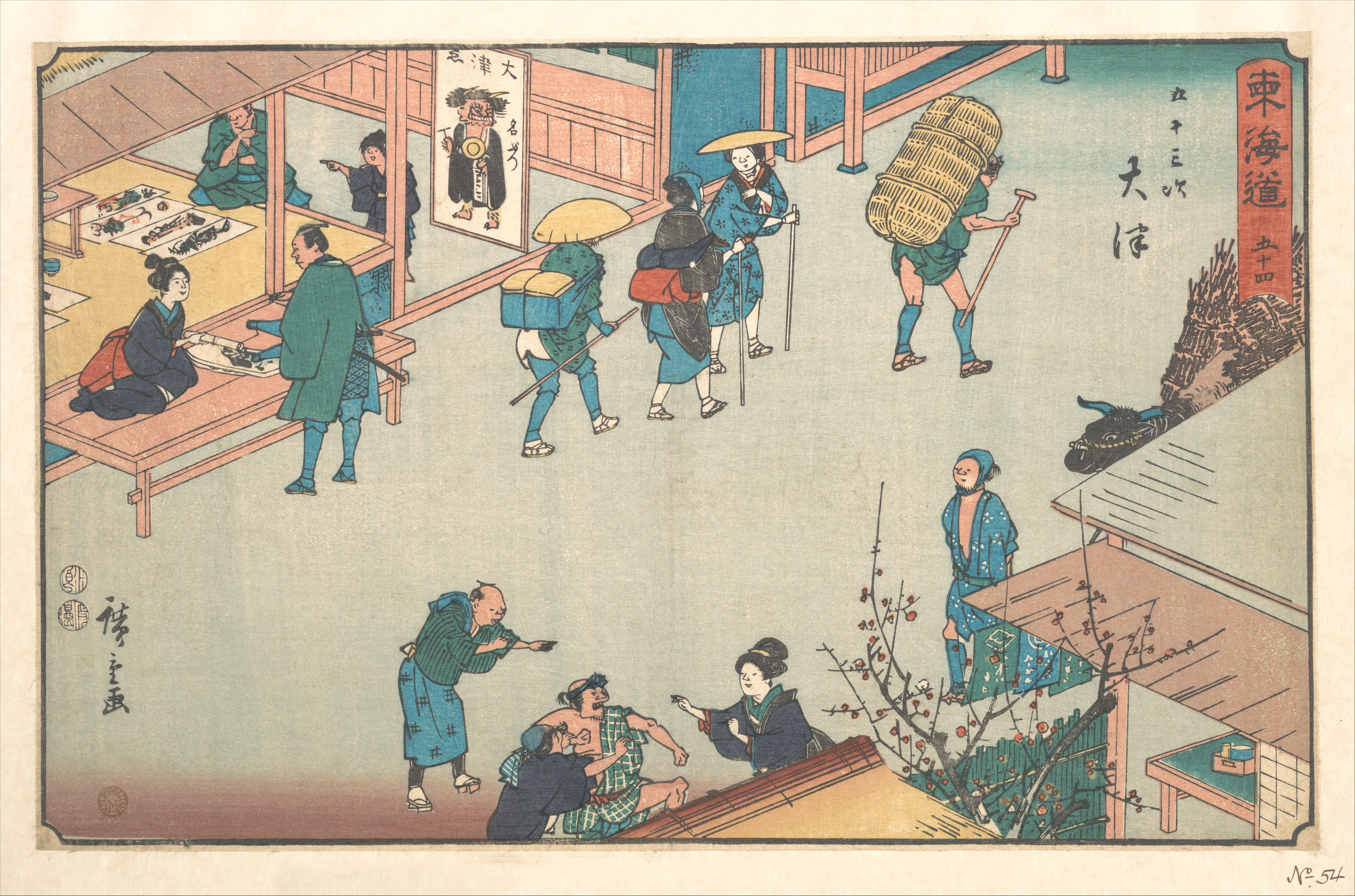
City life in the Edo period, by Hiroshige, c. 1840

By 1800, the commercialization of the economy grew rapidly, bringing more and more remote villages into the national economy. Rich farmers appeared who switched from rice to high-profit commercial crops and engaged in local money-lending, trade, and small-scale manufacturing. Wealthy merchants were often forced to "lend" money to the shogunate or daimyos (often never returned). They often had to hide their wealth, and some sought higher social status by using money to marry into the samurai class. There is some evidence that as merchants gained greater political influence in the late Edo period, the rigid class division between samurai and merchants began to break down.

A few domains, notably Chōshū and Satsuma, used innovative methods to restore their finances, but most sunk further into debt. The financial crisis provoked a reactionary solution near the end of the "Tempo era" (1830–1843) promulgated by the chief counselor Mizuno Tadakuni. He raised taxes, denounced luxuries and tried to impede the growth of business; he failed and it appeared to many that the continued existence of the entire Tokugawa system was in jeopardy.

==== Agriculture ====
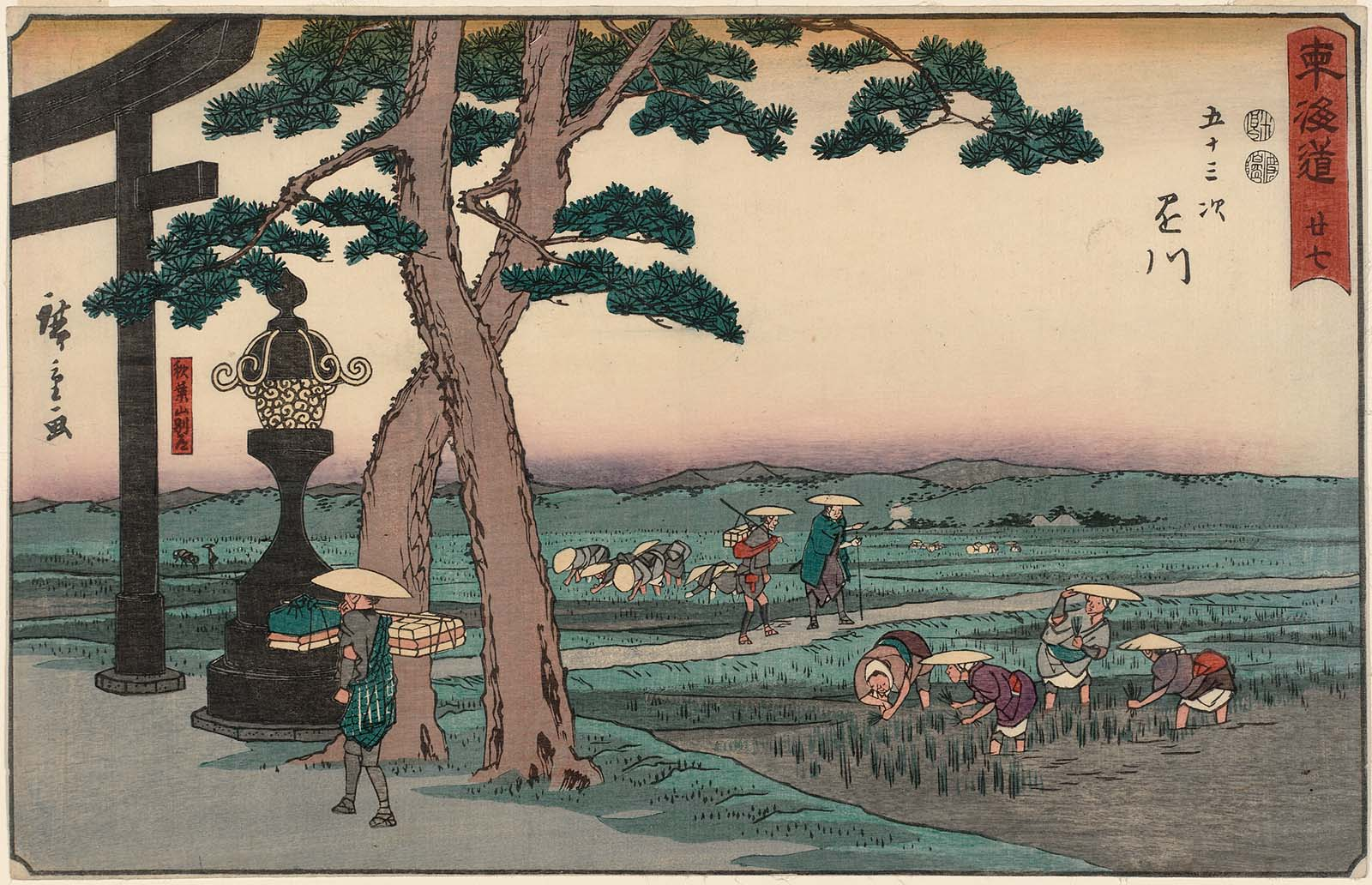
Peasants planting rice, by Utagawa Hiroshige, c. 1847

Rice was the base of the economy. About 80% of the people were rice farmers. Rice production increased steadily, but population remained stable, so prosperity increased. Rice paddies grew from 1.6 million chō in 1600 to 3 million by 1720. Improved technology helped farmers control the all-important flow of irrigation to their paddies. The daimyo operated several hundred castle towns, which became loci of domestic trade.

Large-scale rice markets developed, centered on Edo and Ōsaka. In the cities and towns, guilds of merchants and artisans met the growing demand for goods and services. The merchants, while low in status, prospered, especially those with official patronage. Merchants invented credit instruments to transfer money, currency came into common use, and the strengthening credit market encouraged entrepreneurship. The daimyo collected the taxes from the peasants in the form of rice. Taxes were high, often at around 40%-50% of the harvest. The rice was sold at the fudasashi market in Edo. To raise money, the daimyo used forward contracts to sell rice that was not even harvested yet. These contracts were similar to modern futures trading.

It was during the Edo period that Japan developed an advanced forest management policy. Increased demand for timber resources for construction, shipbuilding and fuel had led to widespread deforestation, which resulted in forest fires, floods and soil erosion. In response the shōgun, beginning around 1666, instituted a policy to reduce logging and increase the planting of trees. The policy mandated that only the shōgun and daimyo could authorize the use of wood. By the 18th century, Japan had developed detailed scientific knowledge about silviculture and plantation forestry.

== Artistic and intellectual development ==
=== Education ===
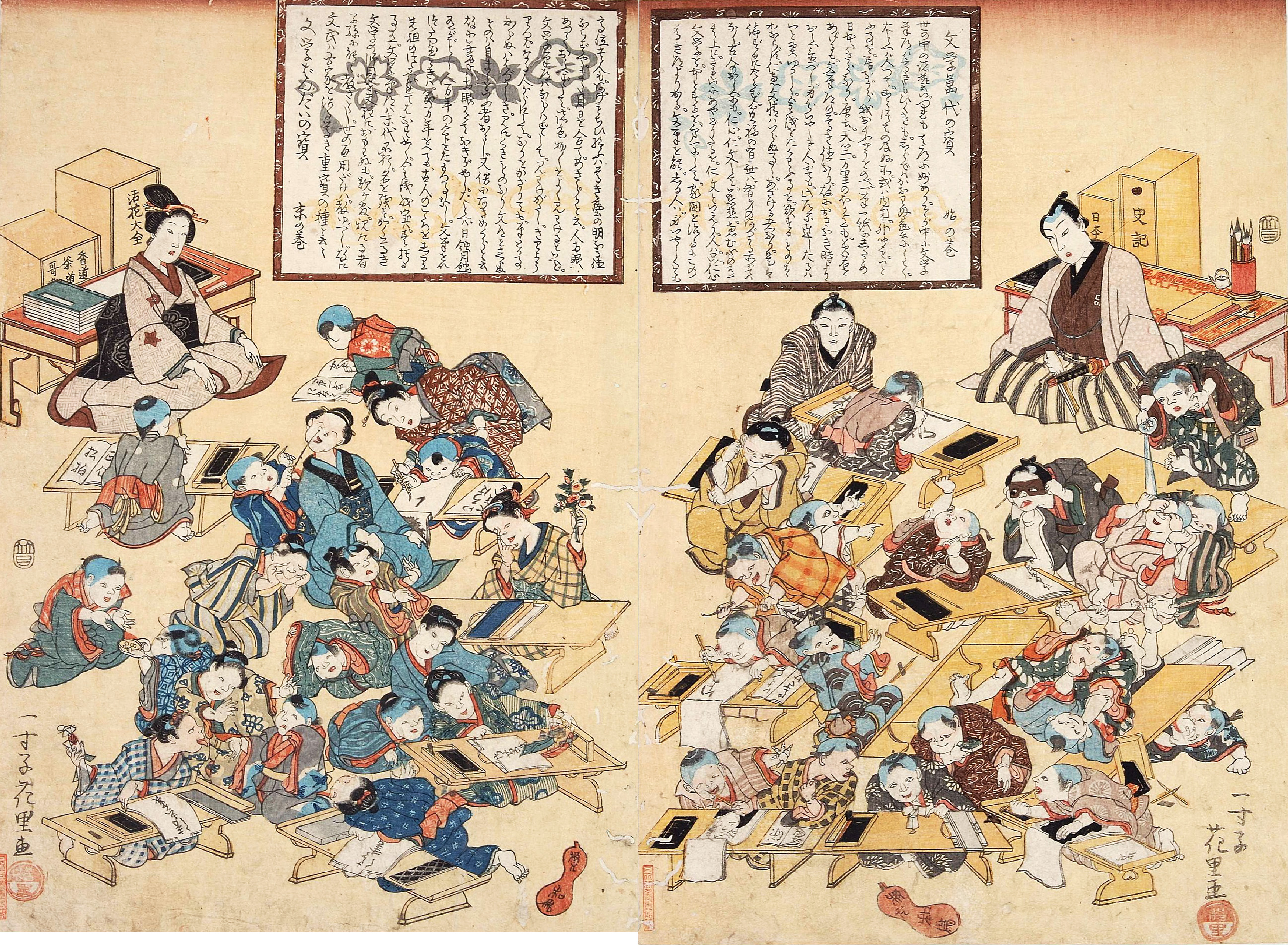
Terakoya, private educational school

The first shogun Ieyasu set up Confucian academies in his shinpan domains and other daimyos followed suit in their own domains, establishing what's known as han schools (藩校, hankō). Within a generation, almost all samurai were literate, as their careers often required knowledge of literary arts. These academies were staffed mostly with other samurai, along with some buddhist and shinto clergymen who were also learned in Neo-Confucianism and the works of Zhu Xi. When the clergy of Shinto religion were alive, samurai, Buddhist monks were also there. Beyond kanji (Chinese characters), the Confucian classics, calligraphy, basic arithmetics, and etiquette, the samurai also learned various martial arts and military skills in schools.

The chōnin (urban merchants and artisans) patronized neighborhood schools called terakoya (寺子屋, "temple schools"). Despite being located in temples, the terakoya curriculum consisted of basic literacy and arithmetic, instead of literary arts or philosophy. High rates of urban literacy in Edo contributed to the prevalence of novels and other literary forms. In urban areas, children were often taught by masterless samurai, while in rural areas priests from Buddhist temples or Shinto shrines often did the teaching. Unlike in the cities, in rural Japan, only children of prominent farmers would receive education.

In Edo, the shogunate set up several schools under its direct patronage, the most important being the neo-Confucian Shōheikō (昌平黌) acting as a de facto elite school for its bureaucracy but also creating a network of alumni from the whole country. Besides Shoheikō, other important directly run schools at the end of the shogunate included the Wagakukōdansho (和学講談所; "Institute of Lectures of Japanese classics"), specialized in Japanese domestic history and literature, influencing the rise of kokugaku, and the Igakukan (医学間; "Institute of medicine"), focusing on Chinese medicine.

One estimate of literacy in Edo suggest that up to a fifth of males could read, along with a sixth of women. Another estimate states that 40% of men and 10% of women by the end of the Edo period were literate. According to another estimate, around 1800, almost 100% of the samurai class and about 50% to 60% of the chōnin (craftsmen and merchants) class and nōmin (peasants) class were literate. Some historians partially credited Japan's relatively high literacy rates for its fast development after the Meiji Restoration.

As the literacy rate was so high that many ordinary people could read books, books in various genres such as cooking, gardening, travel guides, art books, scripts of bunraku (puppet theatre), kibyōshi (satirical novels), sharebon (books on urban culture), kokkeibon (comical books), ninjōbon (romance novel), yomihon and kusazōshi were published. There were 600 to 800 rental bookstores in Edo, and people borrowed or bought these woodblock print books. The best-selling books in this period were Kōshoku Ichidai Otoko (Life of an Amorous Man) by Ihara Saikaku, Nansō Satomi Hakkenden by Takizawa Bakin and Tōkaidōchū Hizakurige by Jippensha Ikku and these books were reprinted many times.

==== Rangaku ====
During the period, Japan studied Western sciences and techniques (called rangaku, "Dutch studies") through the information and books received through the Dutch traders in Dejima. The main areas that were studied included geography, medicine, natural sciences, astronomy, art, languages, physical sciences such as the study of electrical phenomena, and mechanical sciences as exemplified by the development of Japanese clockwatches, or wadokei, inspired by Western techniques. Among those who studied mechanical science at that time, Tanaka Hisashige, the founder of Toshiba, is worthy of special mention. Because of the technical originality and sophistication of his Myriad year clock and karakuri puppet, they are difficult to restore even today, and are considered a highly mechanical heritage prior to Japan's modernization.

=== Philosophy and religion ===
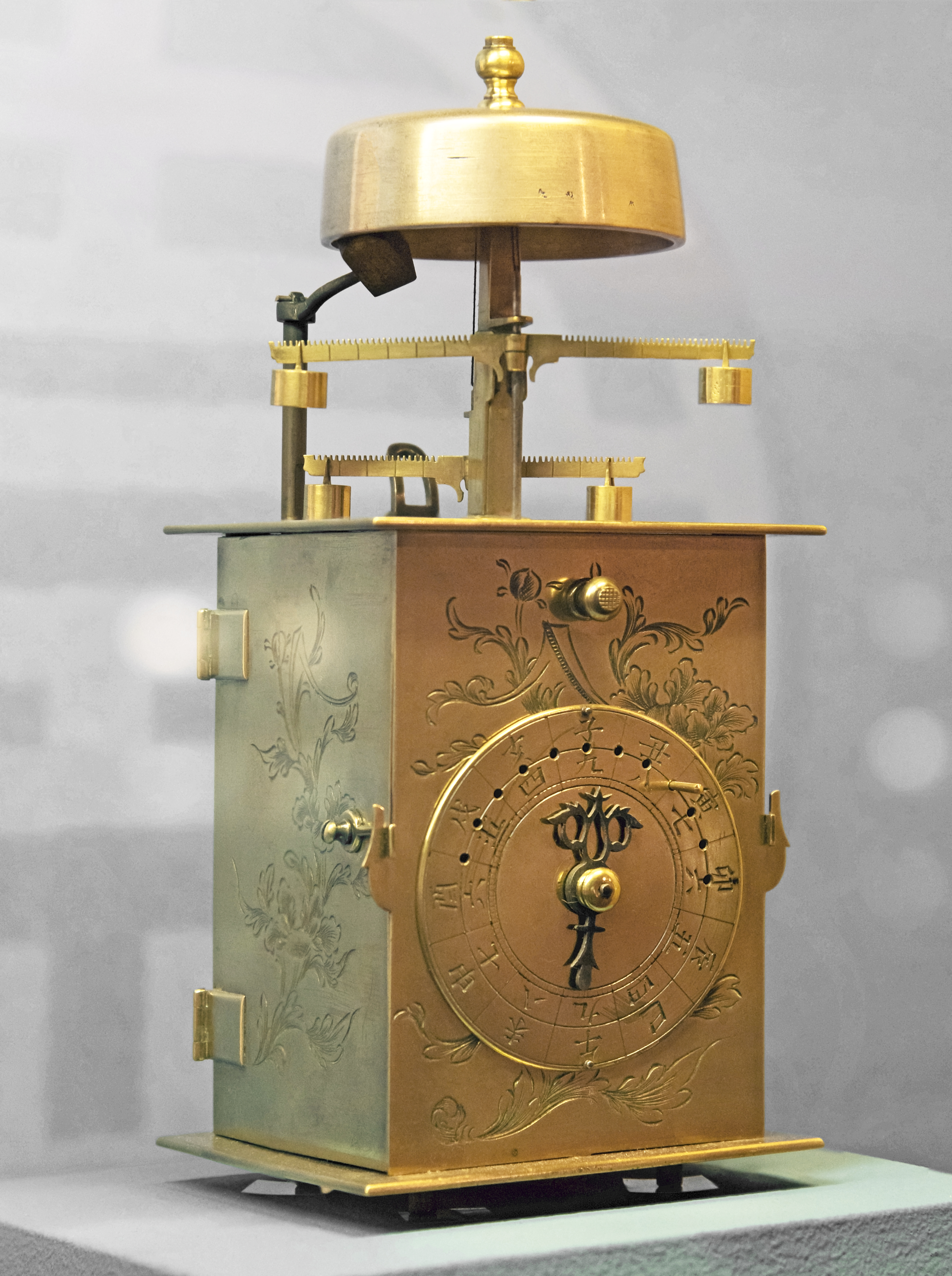
A Wadokei, a Japanese-made clockwatch, 18th century

The flourishing of Neo-Confucianism was the major intellectual development of the Tokugawa period. Confucian studies had long been kept active in Japan by Buddhist clerics, but during the Tokugawa period, Confucianism emerged from Buddhist religious control. This system of thought increased attention to a secular view of man and society. The ethical humanism, rationalism, and historical perspective of neo-Confucian doctrine appealed to the official class. By the mid-17th century, neo-Confucianism was Japan's dominant legal philosophy and contributed directly to the development of the kokugaku (national learning) school of thought.

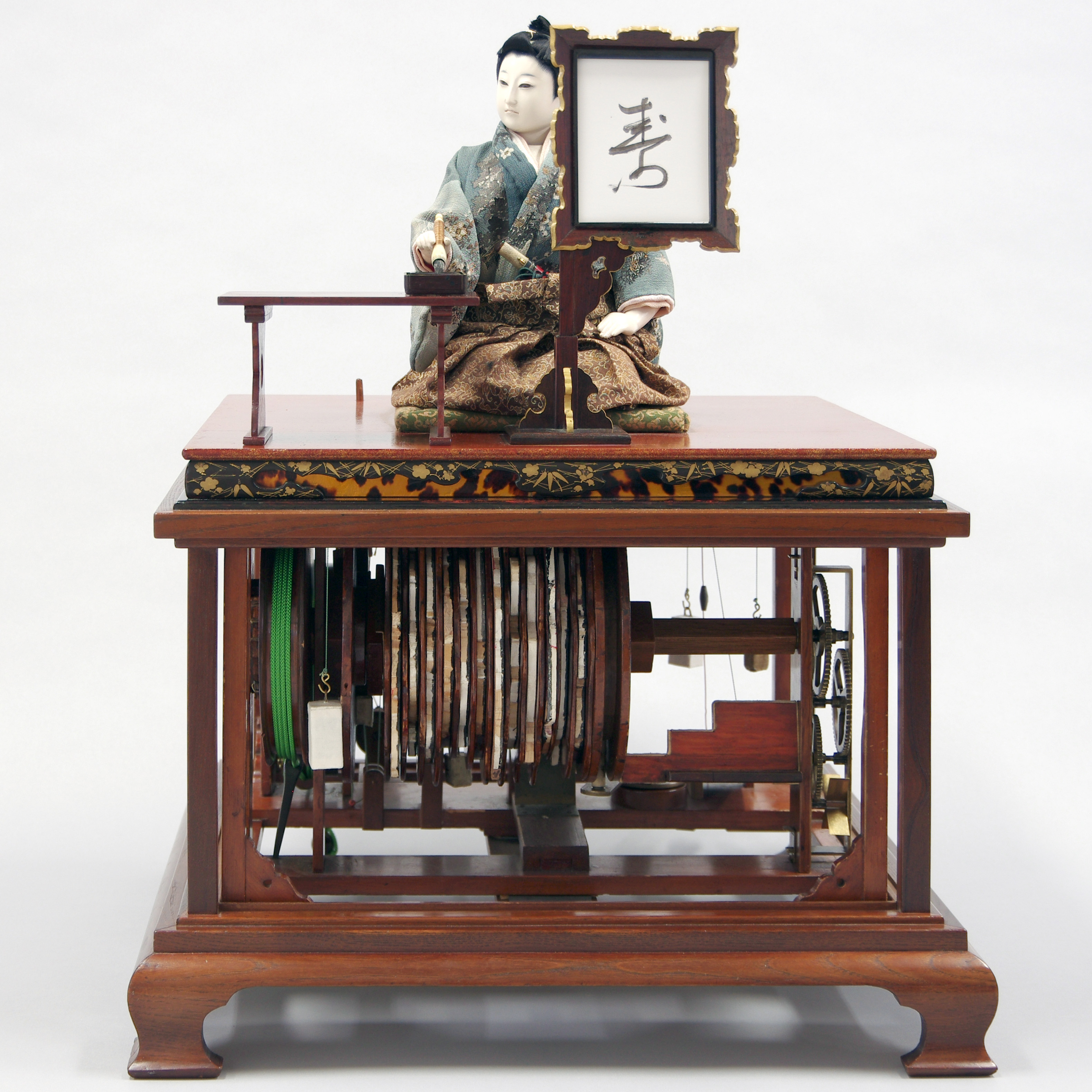
A Karakuri puppet Moji-kaki doll made by Tanaka Hisashige. Using mechanical power, a puppet dips a brush into ink and writes a character on paper. 19th century

Advanced studies and growing applications of neo-Confucianism contributed to the transition of the social and political order from feudal norms to class- and large-group-oriented practices. The rule of the people or Confucian man was gradually replaced by the rule of law. New laws were developed, and new administrative devices were instituted. A new theory of government and a new vision of society emerged as a means of justifying more comprehensive governance by the bakufu.

Each person had a distinct place in society and was expected to work to fulfill their mission in life. The people were to be ruled with benevolence by those assigned to rule. Government was all-powerful but responsible and humane. Although the class system was influenced by neo-Confucianism, it was not identical to it. Whereas soldiers and clergy were at the bottom of the hierarchy in the Chinese model, in Japan, some members of these classes constituted the ruling elite.

Members of the samurai class adhered to bushi traditions with a renewed interest in Japanese history and cultivation of the ways of Confucian scholar-administrators. A distinct culture known as chōnindō ("the way of the townspeople") emerged in cities such as Osaka, Kyoto, and Edo. It encouraged aspiration to bushido qualities—diligence, honesty, honor, loyalty, and frugality—while blending Shinto, neo-Confucian, and Buddhist beliefs. Study of mathematics, astronomy, cartography, engineering, and medicine were also encouraged. Emphasis was placed on quality of workmanship, especially in the arts.

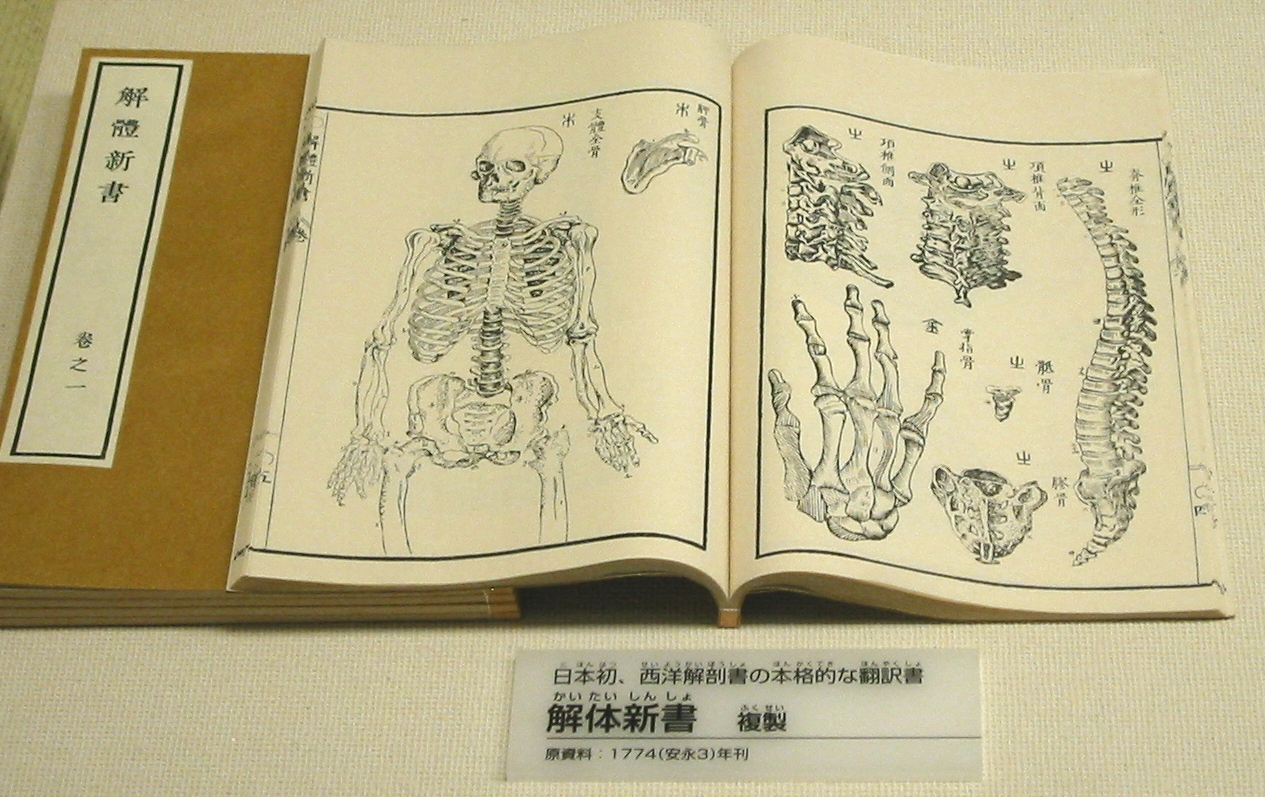
Kaitai Shinsho, Japan's first treatise on Western anatomy, published in 1774

Buddhism and Shinto were both still important in Tokugawa Japan. Buddhism, together with neo-Confucianism, provided standards of social behavior. Although Buddhism was not as politically powerful as it had been in the past, Buddhism continued in the upper classes. Proscriptions against Christianity benefited Buddhism in 1640 when the bakufu ordered everyone to register at a temple. The rigid separation of Tokugawa society into han, villages, wards, and households helped reaffirm local Shinto attachments. Shinto provided spiritual support to the political order and was an important tie between the individual and the community. Shinto also helped preserve a sense of national identity.

Shinto eventually assumed an intellectual form as shaped by neo-Confucian rationalism and materialism. The kokugaku movement emerged from the interactions of these two belief systems. Kokugaku contributed to the emperor-centered nationalism of modern Japan and the revival of Shinto as a national creed in the 18th and 19th centuries. The Kojiki, Nihon Shoki, and Man'yōshū were all studied anew in the search for the Japanese spirit. Some purists in the kokugaku movement, such as Motoori Norinaga, even criticized the Confucian and Buddhist influences – in effect, foreign influences – for contaminating Japan's ancient ways. According to them, Japan was the land of the kami and, as such, had a special destiny.

The "Christian problem" was, in effect, a problem of controlling both the Christian daimyo in Kyūshū and their trade with the Europeans. By 1612, the shōgun's retainers and residents of Tokugawa lands had been ordered to forswear Christianity. More restrictions came in 1616 (the restriction of foreign trade to Nagasaki and Hirado, an island northwest of Kyūshū), 1622 (the execution of 120 missionaries and converts), 1624 (the expulsion of the Jesuits), and 1629 (the execution of thousands of Christians).

The shogunate perceived Christianity as a destabilizing factor, and decided to target it. The Shimabara Rebellion of 1637–1638, in which discontented Catholic samurai and peasants rebelled against the bakufu—and Edo called in Dutch ships to bombard the rebel stronghold—marked the end of the Christian movement, this intervention was however largely ineffective, with the Dutch canons proving too small for the castle walls and their bombardment causing little success. During the Shimabara Rebellion an estimated 37,000 people (mostly Christians) were massacred.

The last Jesuit was either killed or committed apostasy by 1644 and the last organized missionary activity ended mid-century. For more than two centuries until the ban on Christianity was lifted in the 19th century, Christianity's political, economic, and religious influence on Japan became quite limited. Some Christians survived by going underground, the so-called Kakure Kirishitan. To avoid detection, they hid in the remote regions of Kyushu and disguised their practices from government officials and informants. By the 1640s, all Jesuits and other missionaries were executed, expelled, apostatized and forced seclusion. In 1865, after more than two centuries of hiding, a group of Kakure Kirishitan revealed themselves when Japan was forced to end its isolationist policies.

=== Art, culture and entertainment ===
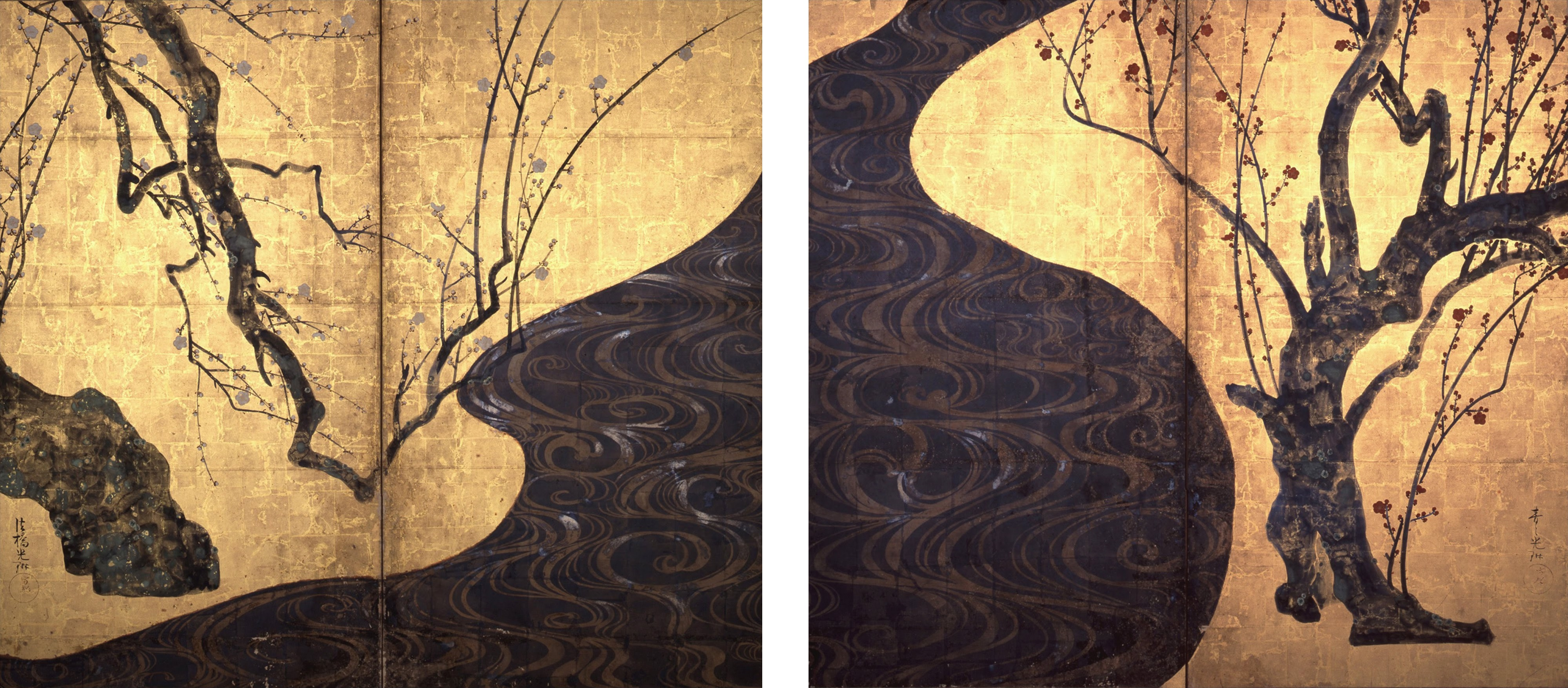
Red and White Plum Blossoms by Ogata Kōrin, 1712–1716

In the field of art, the Rinpa school became popular. Paintings and crafts of the Rinpa school are characterized by highly decorative and showy designs using gold and silver leaves, bold compositions with simplified objects, repeated patterns, and a playful spirit. Important figures in the Rinpa school include Hon'ami Kōetsu, Tawaraya Sōtatsu, Ogata Kōrin, Sakai Hōitsu and Suzuki Kiitsu. Other than the Rinpa school, Maruyama Ōkyo and Itō Jakuchū are famous for their realistic painting techniques. They produced their works under the patronage of wealthy merchants newly emerging from the economic development of this period. Following the Azuchi-Momoyama period, the painters of the Kano school drew pictures on the walls and fusumas of castles and temples with the support of powerful people.

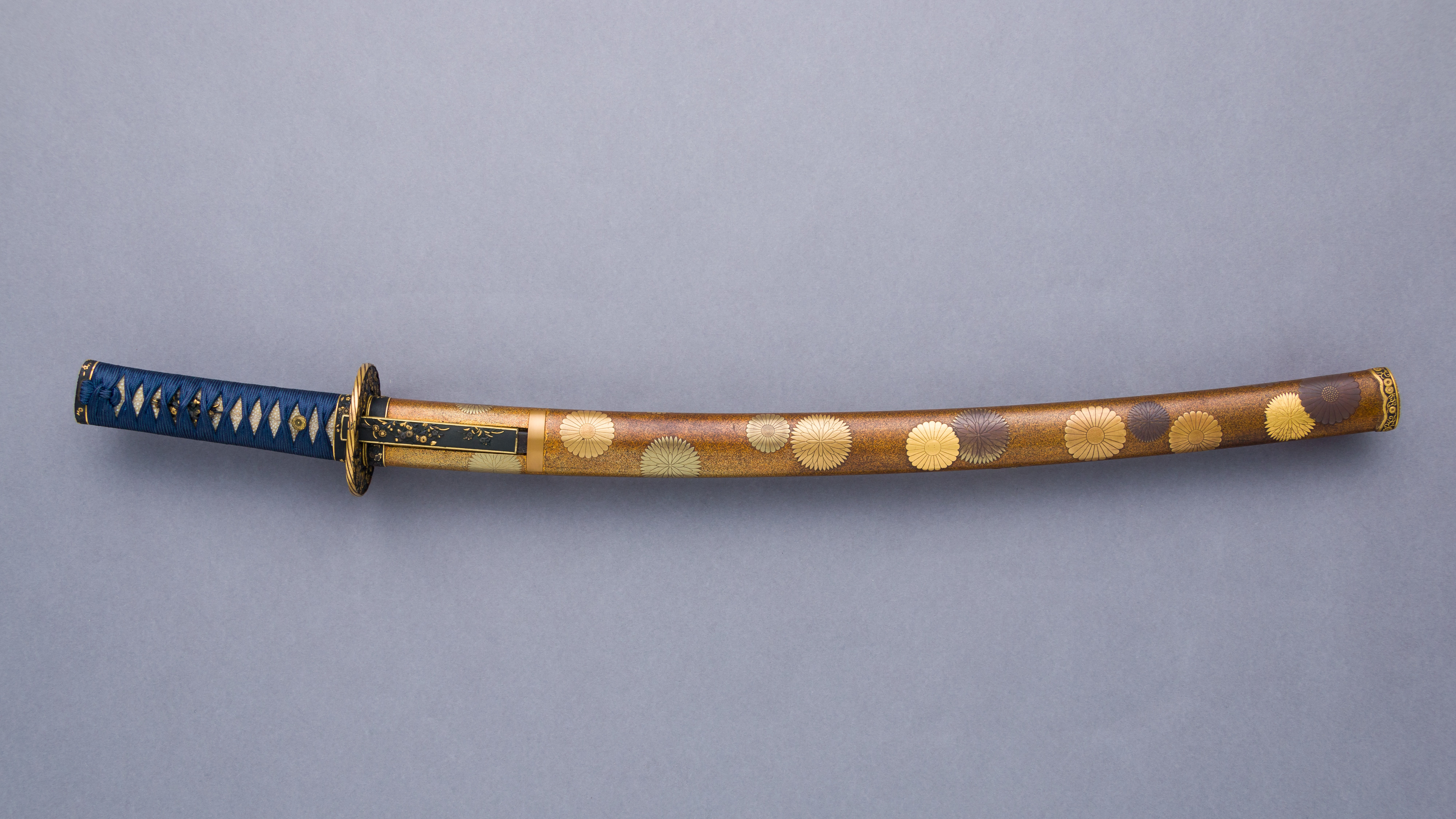
Mounting for wakizashi decorated with lacquer of maki-e technique. 18th century

Due to the end of the period of civil war and the development of the economy, many crafts with high artistic value were produced. Among the samurai class, arms came to be treated like works of art, and Japanese sword mountings and Japanese armour beautifully decorated with lacquer of maki-e technique and metal carvings became popular. Each han (daimyo domain) encouraged the production of crafts to improve their finances, and crafts such as furnishings and inro beautifully decorated with lacquer, metal or ivory became popular among rich people. The Kaga Domain, which was ruled by the Maeda clan, was especially enthusiastic about promoting crafts, and the area still boasts a reputation that surpasses Kyoto in crafts even today.

For the first time, urban populations had the means and leisure time to support a new mass culture. Their search for enjoyment became known as ukiyo (the floating world), an ideal world of fashion, popular entertainment, and the discovery of aesthetic qualities in objects and actions of everyday life. This increasing interest in pursuing recreational activities helped to develop an array of new industries, many of which could be found in an area known as Yoshiwara. The district was known for being the center of Edo's developing sense of elegance and refinement. Established in 1617 as the city's shogunate-sanctioned prostitution district, it kept this designation about 250 years. Yoshiwara was home to mostly women who, due to unfortunate circumstances, found themselves working in this secluded environment.

Professional female entertainers (geisha), music, popular stories, Kabuki (theater) and bunraku (puppet theater), poetry, and art that was exemplified by woodblock prints (known as ukiyo-e), were all part of this flowering of culture. Literature also flourished with the examples of the playwright Chikamatsu Monzaemon (1653–1724) and the poet, essayist, and travel writer Matsuo Bashō (1644–1694).

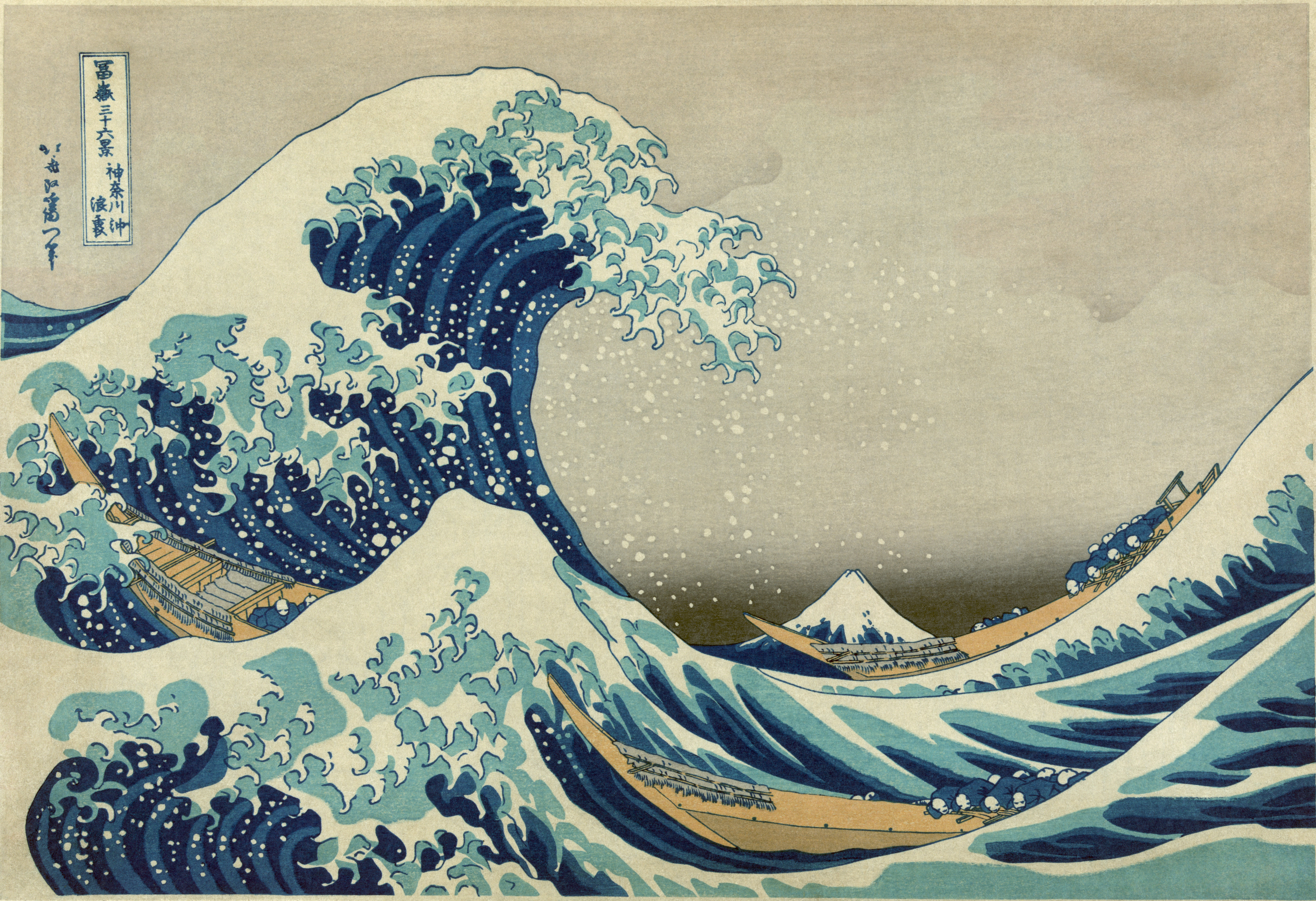
The Great Wave off Kanagawa, full-colour ukiyo-e woodblock print, Hokusai, c. 1829–1832

Ukiyo-e is a genre of painting and printmaking that developed in the late 17th century, at first depicting the entertainments of the pleasure districts of Edo, such as courtesans and kabuki actors. Harunobu produced the first full-colour nishiki-e prints in 1765, a form that has become synonymous to most with ukiyo-e. The genre reached a peak in technique towards the end of the century with the works of such artists as Kiyonaga and Utamaro. As the Edo period came to an end a great diversity of genres proliferated: warriors, nature, folklore, and the landscapes of Hokusai and Hiroshige. The genre declined throughout the rest of the century in the face of modernization that saw ukiyo-e as both old-fashioned and laborious to produce compared to Western technologies. Ukiyo-e was a primary part of the wave of Japonisme that swept Western art in the late 19th century.

The Edo period was characterized by an unprecedented series of economic developments (despite termination of contact with the outside world) and cultural maturation, especially in terms of theater, music, and other entertainment. For example, a poetic meter for music called kinsei kouta-chō was invented during this time and is still used today in folk songs. Music and theater were influenced by the social gap between the noble and commoner classes, and different arts became more defined as this gap widened.

Several different types of kabuki emerged. Some, such as shibaraku, were only available at a certain time of year, while some companies only performed for nobles. Fashion trends, satirization of local news stories, and advertisements were often part of kabuki theater, as well. Along with kabuki, storytelling entertainments were popular among the common people, and people enjoyed rakugo, a comical story, and kōdan, a historical story, in a dedicated theater called yose. The most popular sport was sumo.

Eating out became popular due to urbanization. Particularly popular among ordinary people were stalls serving fast food such as soba, sushi, tempura, and unagi, tofu restaurants, teahouses and izakaya (Japanese-style pubs). A number of ryotei also opened to serve high-class food. People enjoyed eating at restaurants by buying books that listed restaurant ratings that imitated sumo rankings.

Gardening was a popular pastime. Especially in Edo, residences of daimyo (feudal lords) of each domain were gathered, and many gardeners existed to manage these gardens, which led to the development of horticultural techniques. Among people, cherry blossoms, morning glories, Japanese irises and chrysanthemums were especially popular, and bonsai using deep pots became popular. Not only did people buy plants and appreciate flowers, but they were also enthusiastic about improving the varieties of flowers, so specialized books were published one after another. For example, Matsudaira Sadatomo produced 300 varieties of iris and published a technical book.

Traveling became popular among people because of the improvement of roads and post towns. The main destinations were famous temples and Shinto shrines around the country, and eating and drinking at the inns and prostitution were one of the main attractions. What people admired most was the visit to Ise Grand Shrine and the summit of Mount Fuji, which are considered the most sacred places in Japan. The Ise Grand Shrine in particular has been visited by an enormous number of visitors.

Historical documents record that 3.62 million people visited the shrine in 50 days in 1625. 1.18 million people visited it in three days in 1829 when the grand festival held every 20 years (Shikinen Sengu) was held. It was a once-in-a-lifetime event for people living in remote areas, so they set up a joint fund for each village, saved their travel expenses, and went on a group trip. Local residents of Ise Grand Shrine and Mount Fuji used to send specialized advertising personnel to various parts of Japan to solicit trips to local areas to make money from tourism.

Art, culture

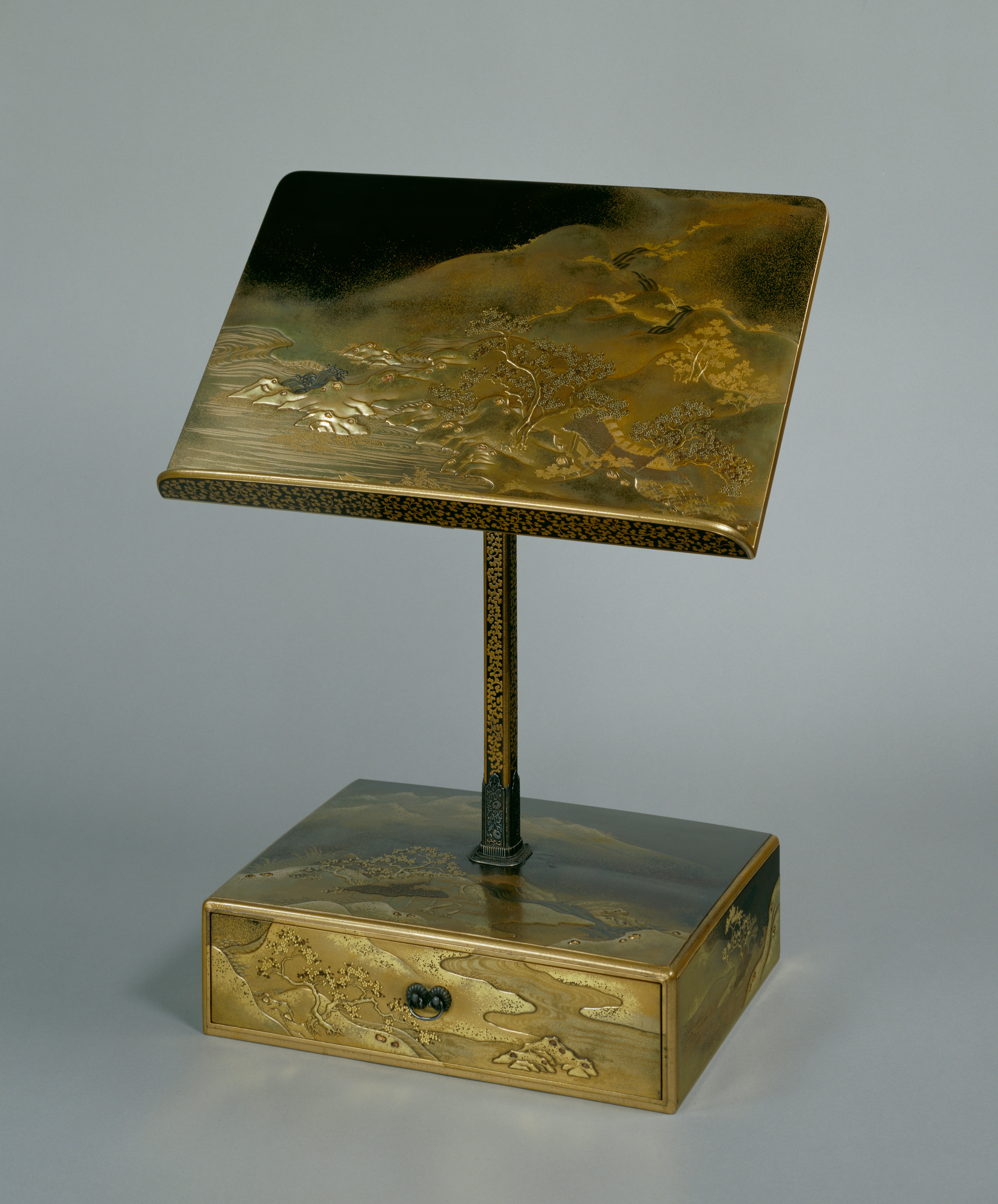
Reading stand with Mt. Yoshino, decorated with lacquer of maki-e technique. 18th century

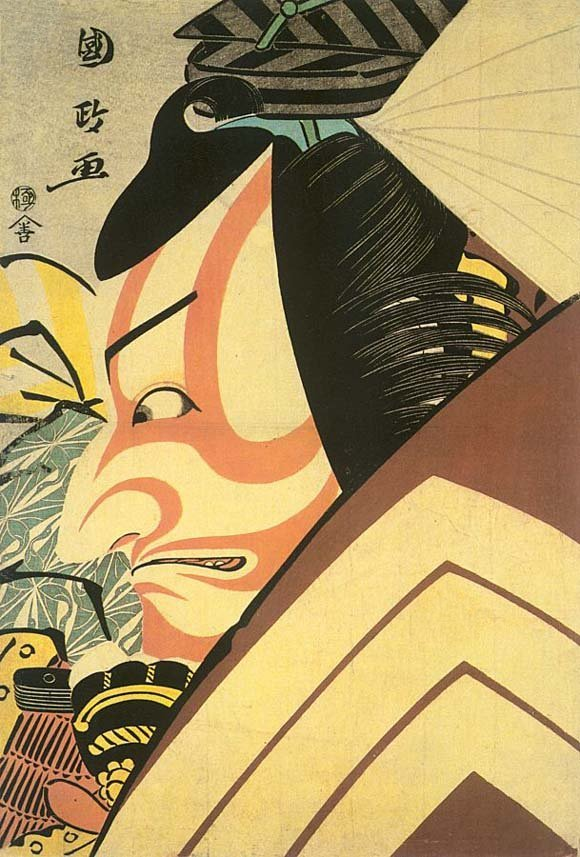
Ukiyo-e based on kabuki actors became popular. Ichikawa Danjūrō V in the popular kabuki play Shibaraku, by Utagawa Kunimasa, 1796

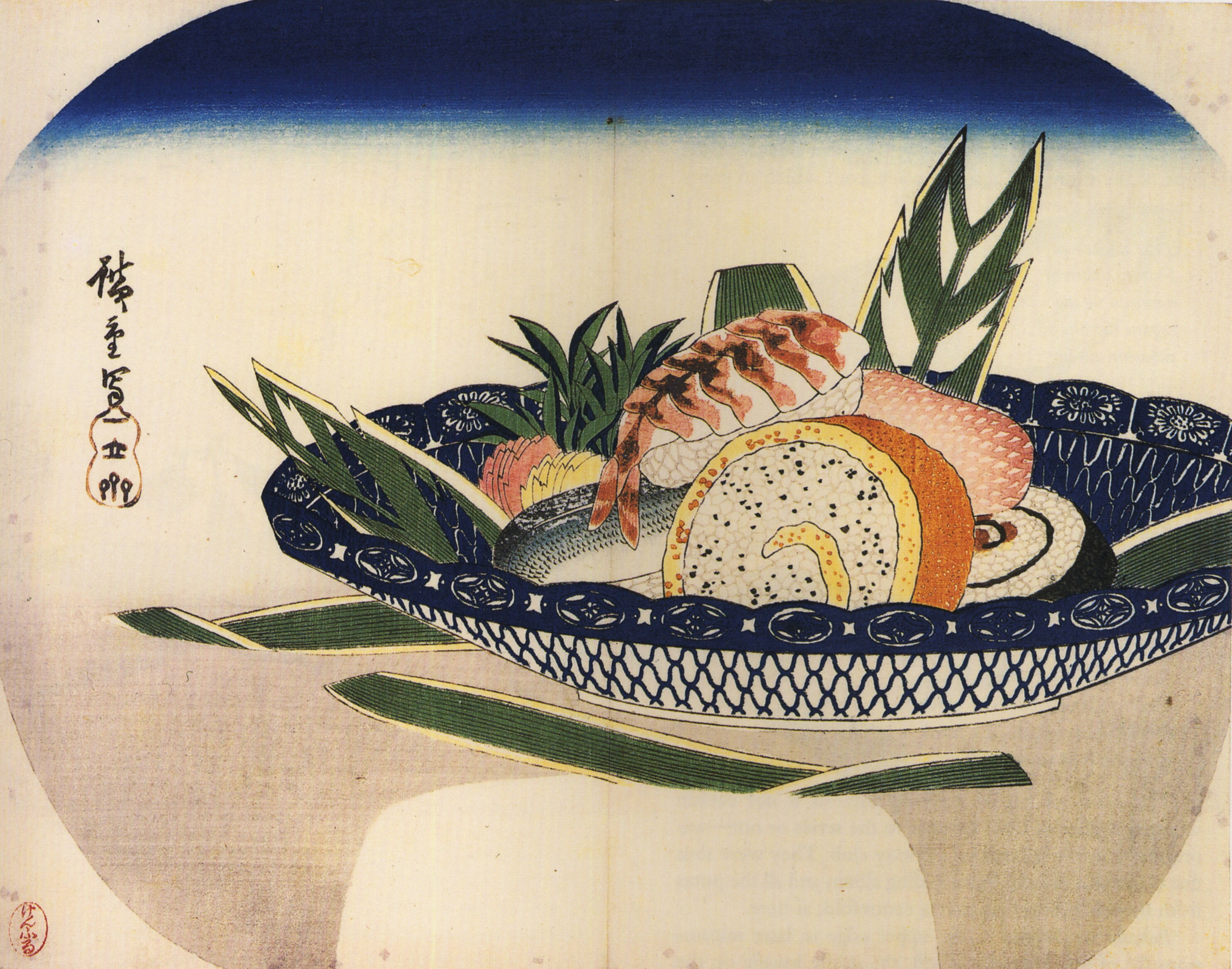
Ukiyo-e depicting Sushi, by Hiroshige

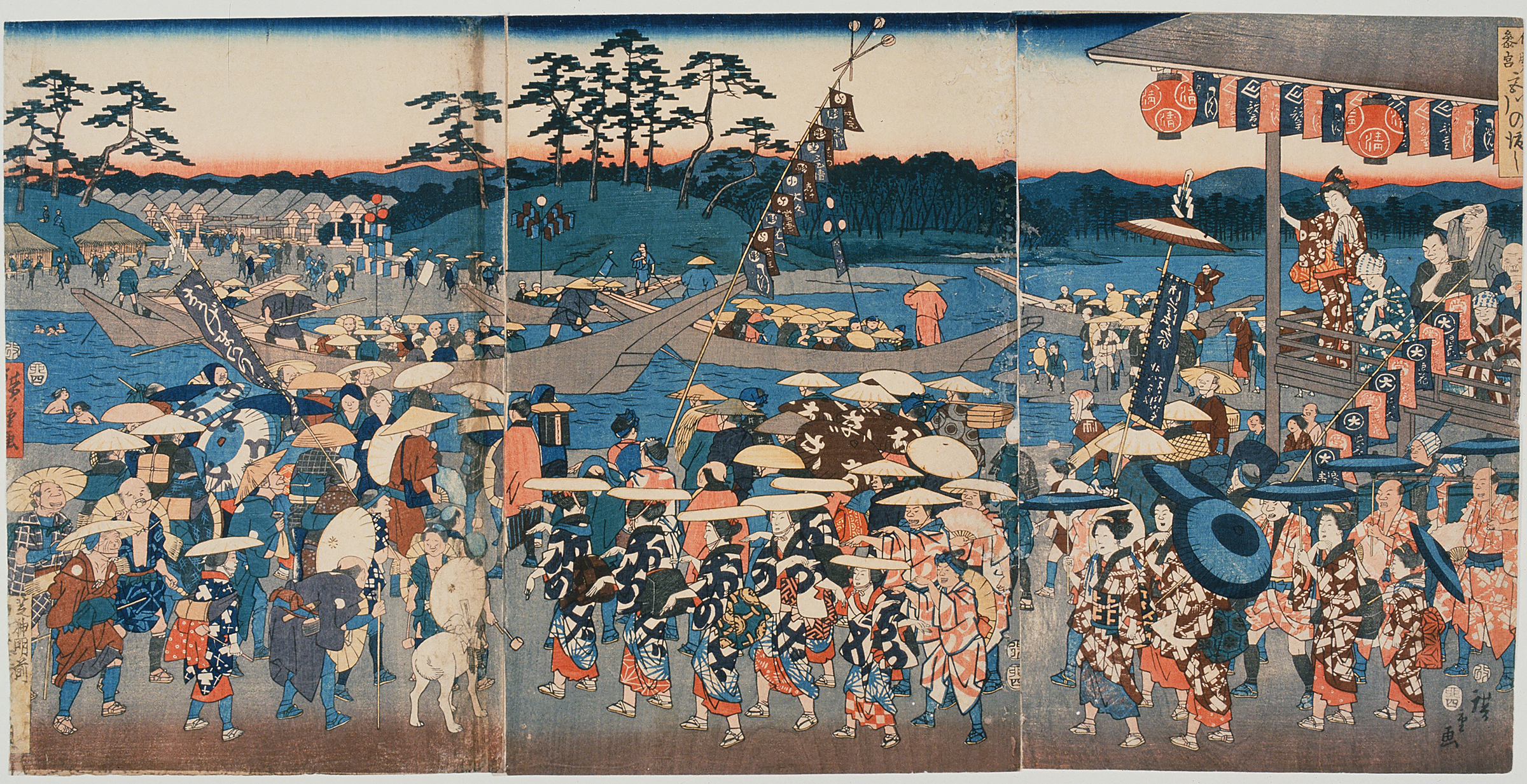
A boarding place for a ferry on the Miya River, which is crowded with people visiting Ise Grand Shrine. By Hiroshige

=== Fashion ===
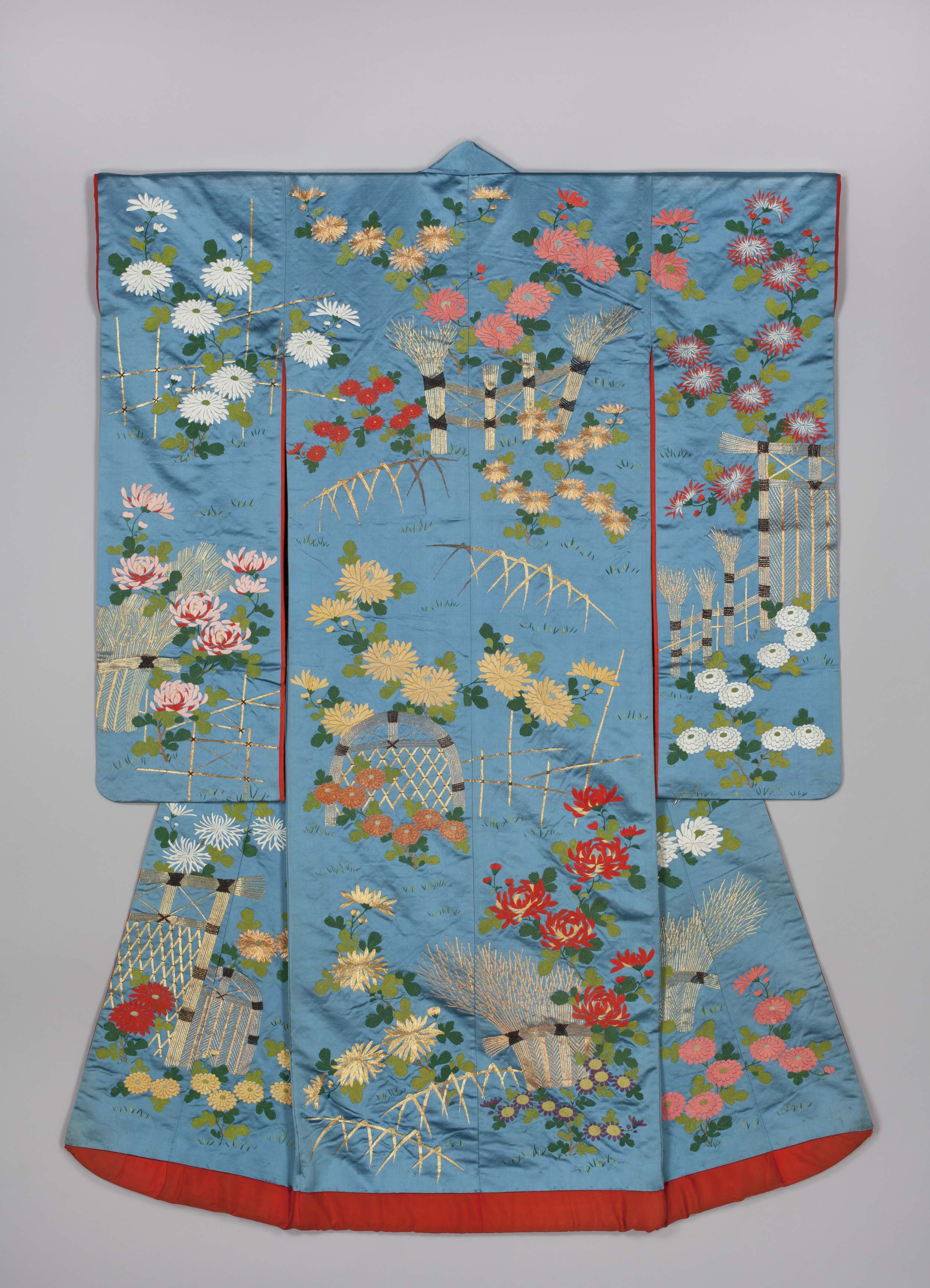
Outer kimono for a young woman (uchikake), 1840–1870, Khalili Collection of Kimono

Clothing acquired a wide variety of designs and decorative techniques, especially for kimono worn by women. The main consumers of kimono were the samurai who used lavish clothing and other material luxuries to signal their place at the top of the social order. Driven by this demand, the textile industry grew and used increasingly sophisticated methods of weaving, dyeing, and embroidery. Over this period, women adopted brighter colours and bolder designs, whereas women's and men's kimono had been very similar. The rise of a merchant class fuelled more demand for elaborate costumes. While ordinary kimono would usually be created by women at home, luxurious silk kimono were designed and created by specialist artists who were usually men.

A kind of kimono specific to the military elite is the goshodoki or "palace court style", which would be worn in the residence of a military leader (a shōgun or daimyo). These would have landscape scenes, among which there are other motifs usually referencing classic literature. Samurai men would dress with a more understated design with geometrical designs concentrated around the waist. The yogi, or sleeping kimono, is a thickly wadded form of wearable bedding, usually with simple designs.

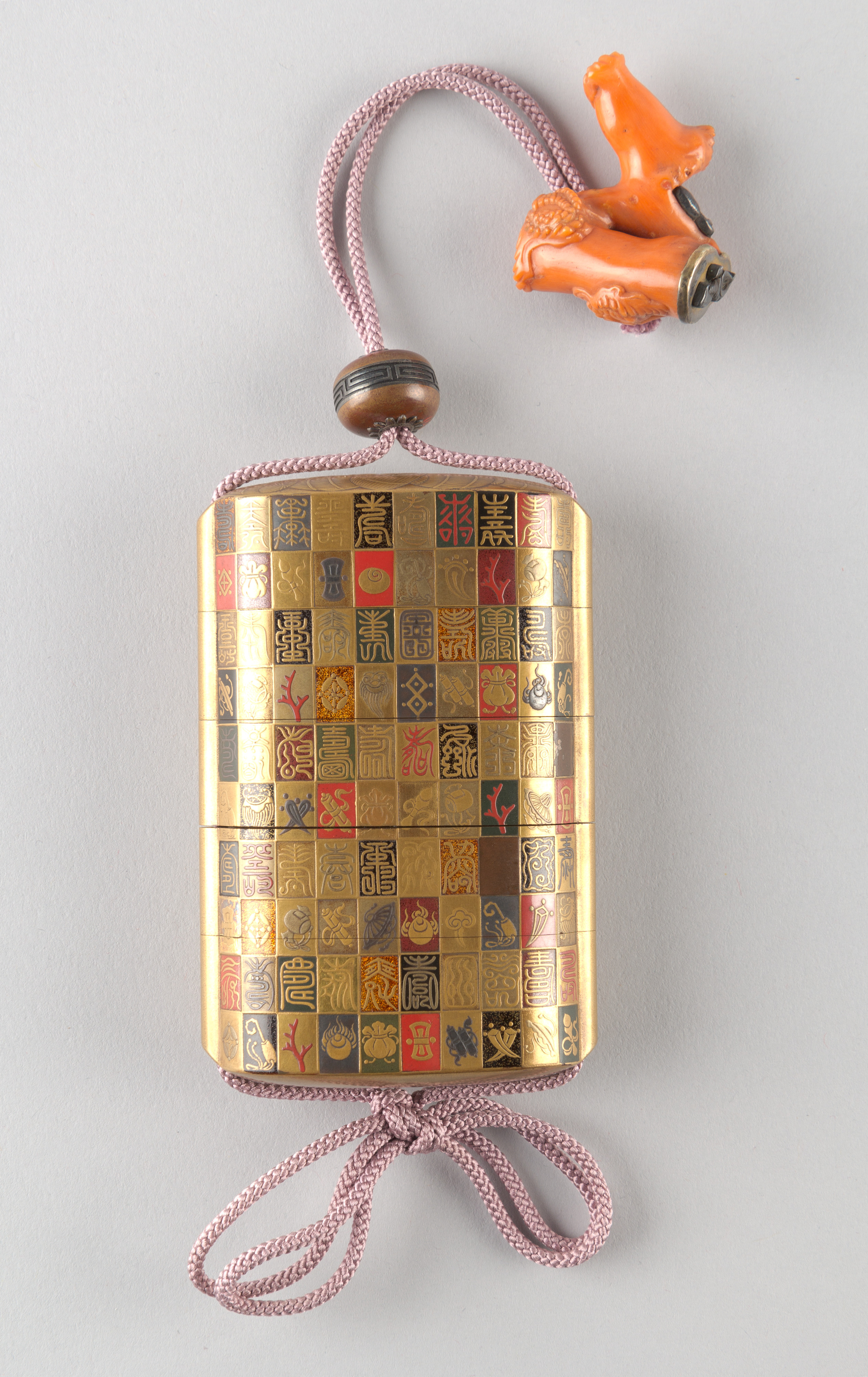
Inro and Netsuke, 18th century

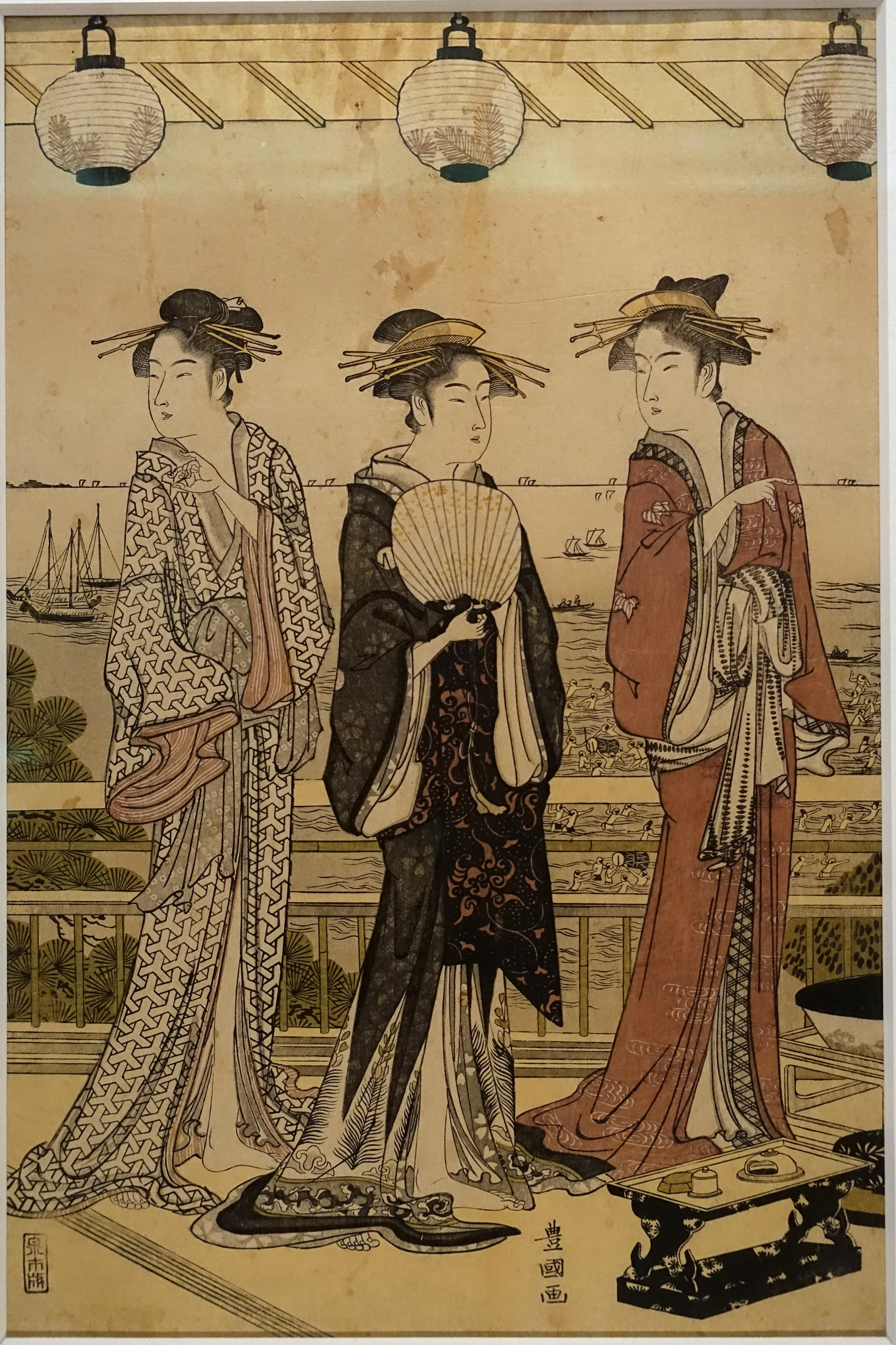
Ladies fashion in 1700s by Utagawa Toyokuni

A style called tsuma moyō had rich decoration from the waist down only, and family emblems on the neck and shoulders. These would be worn by women of the merchant class. The kimono of merchant-class women were more subdued than those of the samurai, but still with bold colours and designs representing nature.

Red was a popular colour for wealthy women, partly because of its cultural association with youth and passion, and partly because the dye – derived from safflower – was very expensive, so a bright red garment was an ostentatious display of wealth. Indian fabrics, brought to Japan by Dutch importers, were received with enthusiasm and found many uses. Japanese designers started printing designs that were influenced by the Indian patterns. Some garments used fabric imported from Britain or France. Ownership of these exotic textiles signified wealth and taste, but they were worn as undergarments where the designs would not be seen.

Inro and netsuke became popular as accessories among men. Originally, inro was a portable case to put a seal or medicine, and netsuke was a fastener attached to the case, and both were practical tools. However, from the middle of the Edo period, products with high artistic value appeared and became popular as male accessories. Especially samurai and wealthy merchants competed to buy inro of high artistic value. At the end of the Edo period, the artistic value of inro further increased and it became regarded as an art collection.

== End of the shogunate ==
=== Decline of the Tokugawa ===
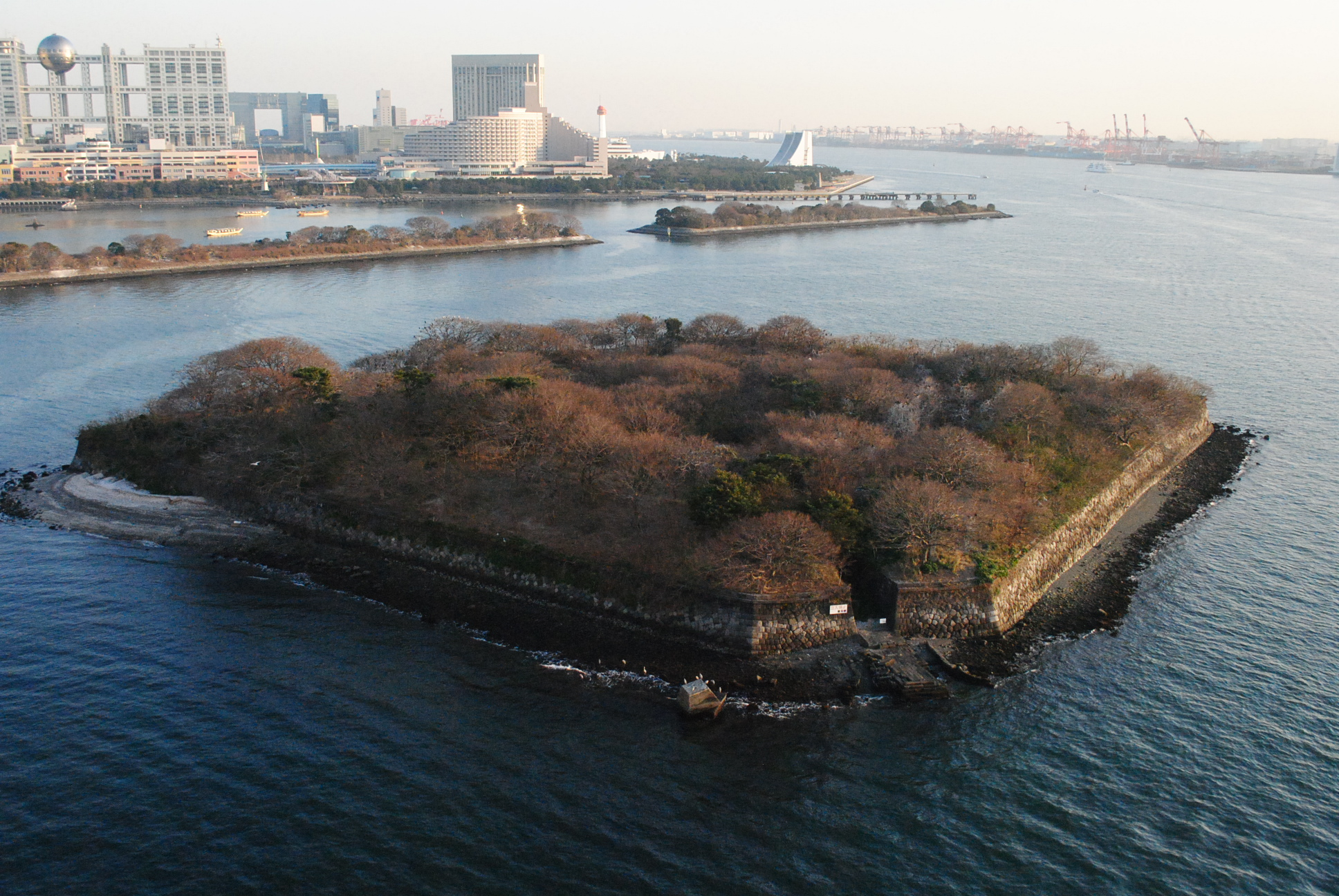
Dai-Roku Daiba (第六台場) or "No. 6 Battery", one of the original Edo-era battery islands

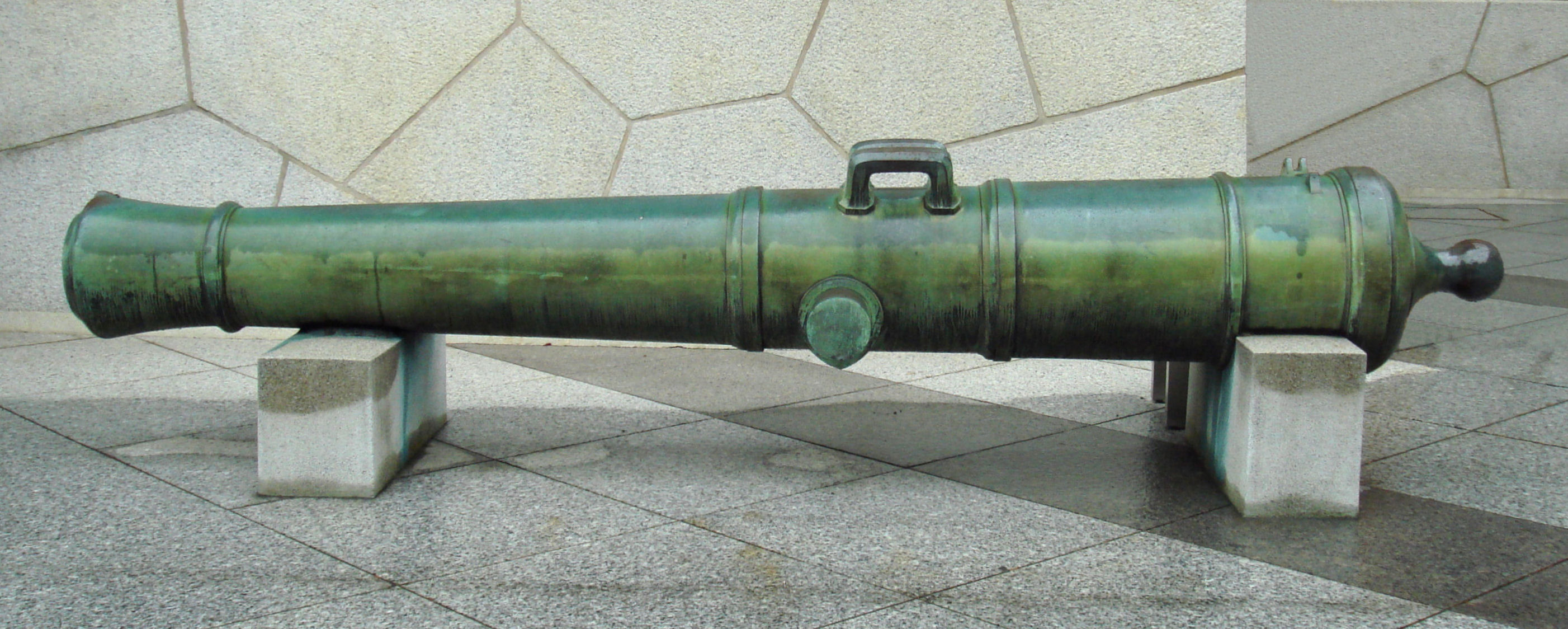
One of the cannons of Odaiba, now at the Yasukuni Shrine. 80-pound bronze, bore: 250mm, length: 3830mm

The end of this period is specifically called the late Tokugawa shogunate. The cause for the end of this period is controversial but is often recounted as resulting from the forced opening of Japan to the world, by Commodore Matthew Perry of the US Navy, whose armada (known by the Japanese as "the black ships") fired weapons from Edo Bay. Several artificial land masses were created to block the range of the armada, and this land remains in what is presently called the Odaiba district.

The Tokugawa did not eventually collapse simply because of intrinsic failures. Foreign intrusions helped to precipitate a complex political struggle between the bakufu and a coalition of its critics. The continuity of the anti-bakufu movement in the mid-19th century would finally bring down the Tokugawa. Historians consider that a major contributing factor to the decline of the Tokugawa was "poor management of the central government by the shōgun, which caused the social classes in Japan to fall apart". From the outset, the Tokugawa attempted to restrict families' accumulation of wealth and fostered a "back to the soil" policy, in which the farmer, the ultimate producer, was the ideal person in society.

The standard of living for urban and rural dwellers alike grew significantly during the Tokugawa period. Better means of crop production, transport, housing, food, and entertainment were all available, as was more leisure time, at least for urban dwellers. The literacy rate was high for a preindustrial society (by some estimates the literacy rate in the city of Edo was 80 percent), and cultural values were redefined and widely imparted throughout the samurai and chōnin classes.

Despite the reappearance of guilds, economic activities went well beyond the restrictive nature of the guilds, and commerce spread and a money economy developed. Although government heavily restricted the merchants and viewed them as unproductive and usurious members of society, the samurai, who gradually became separated from their rural ties, depended greatly on the merchants and artisans for consumer goods, artistic interests, and loans. In this way, a subtle subversion of the warrior class by the chōnin took place.

A struggle arose in the face of political limitations that the shōgun imposed on the entrepreneurial class. The government ideal of an agrarian society failed to square with the reality of commercial distribution. A huge government bureaucracy had evolved, which now stagnated because of its discrepancy with a new and evolving social order. Compounding the situation, the population increased significantly during the first half of the Tokugawa period. Although the magnitude and growth rates are uncertain, there were at least 26 million commoners and about four million members of samurai families and their attendants when the first nationwide census was taken in 1721. Drought, followed by crop shortages and starvation, resulted in twenty great famines between 1675 and 1837. During the Tokugawa period, there were 154 famines, of which 21 were widespread and serious.

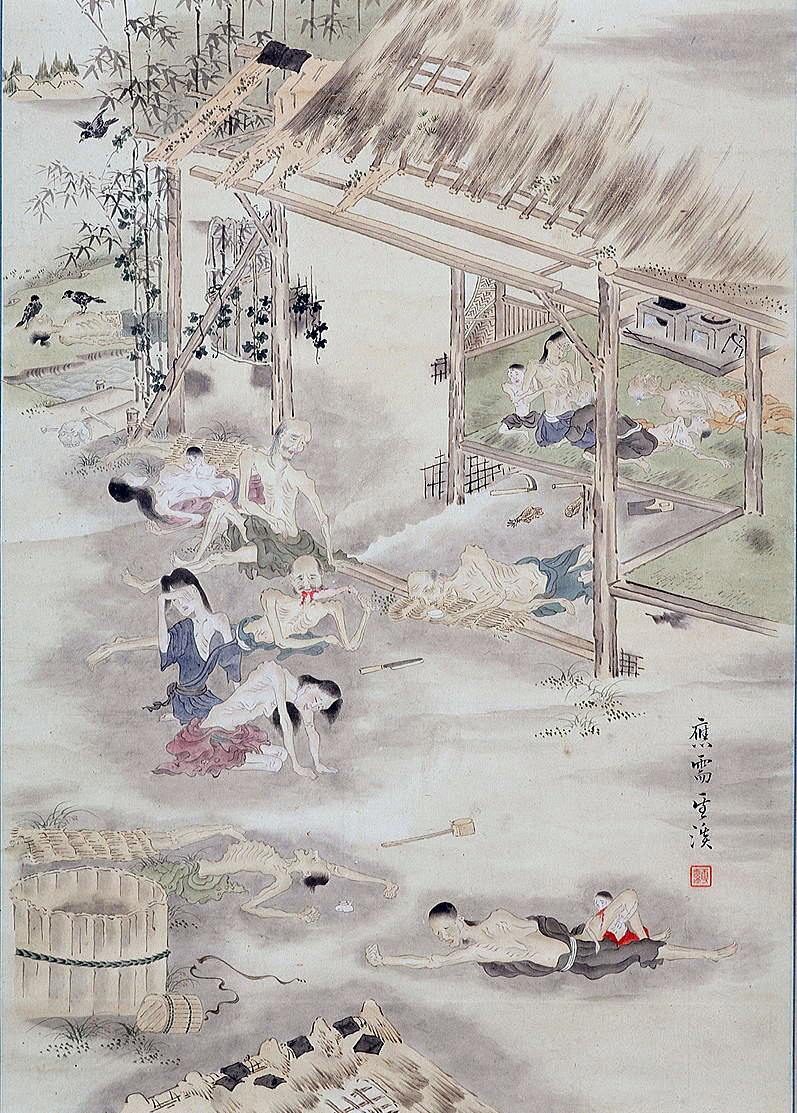
Starving peasants during the Great Tenmei famine

The Great Tenmei famine (1782 until 1788) was the worst famine in the Edo period. Many crops were damaged due to bad weather, serious cold and the 1783 eruption of Mount Asama. A worsening factor of the Great Tenmei famine was a drop in global temperatures due to the eruption of the Icelandic volcano Laki in 1783. The spread of the famine was largely due to mismanagement of the Shogunate and the clan.

Peasant unrest grew, and by the late 18th century, mass protests over taxes and food shortages had become commonplace. Newly landless families became tenant farmers, while the displaced rural poor moved into the cities. As the fortunes of previously well-to-do families declined, others moved in to accumulate land, and a new, wealthy farming class emerged. Those people who benefited were able to diversify production and to hire laborers, while others were left discontented. Many samurai fell on hard times and were forced into handicraft production and wage jobs for merchants.

Although Japan was able to acquire and refine a wide variety of scientific knowledge, the rapid industrialization of the West during the 18th century created a material gap in terms of technologies and armament between Japan and the West, forcing it to abandon its policy of seclusion, which contributed to the end of the Tokugawa regime.

Western intrusions were on the increase in the early 19th century. Russian warships and traders encroached on Sakhalin and on the Kuril Islands, the southernmost of which are considered by the Japanese as the northern islands of Hokkaido. A British warship entered Nagasaki harbour searching for enemy Dutch ships in 1808, and other warships and whalers were seen in Japanese waters with increasing frequency in the 1810s and 1820s. Whalers and trading ships from the United States also arrived on Japan's shores. Although the Japanese made some minor concessions and allowed some landings, they largely attempted to keep all foreigners out, sometimes using force. Rangaku became crucial not only in understanding the foreign "barbarians" but also in using the knowledge gained from the West to fend them off.

By the 1830s, there was a general sense of crisis. Famines and natural disasters hit hard, and unrest led to a peasant uprising against officials and merchants in Osaka in 1837. Although it lasted only a day, the uprising made a dramatic impression. Remedies came in the form of traditional solutions that sought to reform moral decay rather than address institutional problems. The shōgun's advisers pushed for a return to the martial spirit, more restrictions on foreign trade and contacts, suppression of rangaku, censorship of literature, and elimination of "luxury" in the government and samurai class.

Others sought the overthrow of the Tokugawa and espoused the political doctrine of sonnō jōi (revere the emperor, expel the barbarians), which called for unity under imperial rule and opposed foreign intrusions. The bakufu persevered for the time being amidst growing concerns over Western successes in establishing colonial enclaves in China following the First Opium War of 1839–1842. More reforms were ordered, especially in the economic sector, to strengthen Japan against the Western threat.

Japan turned down a demand from the United States, which was greatly expanding its own presence in the Asia-Pacific region, to establish diplomatic relations when Commodore James Biddle appeared in Edo Bay with two warships in July 1846.

=== End of seclusion ===
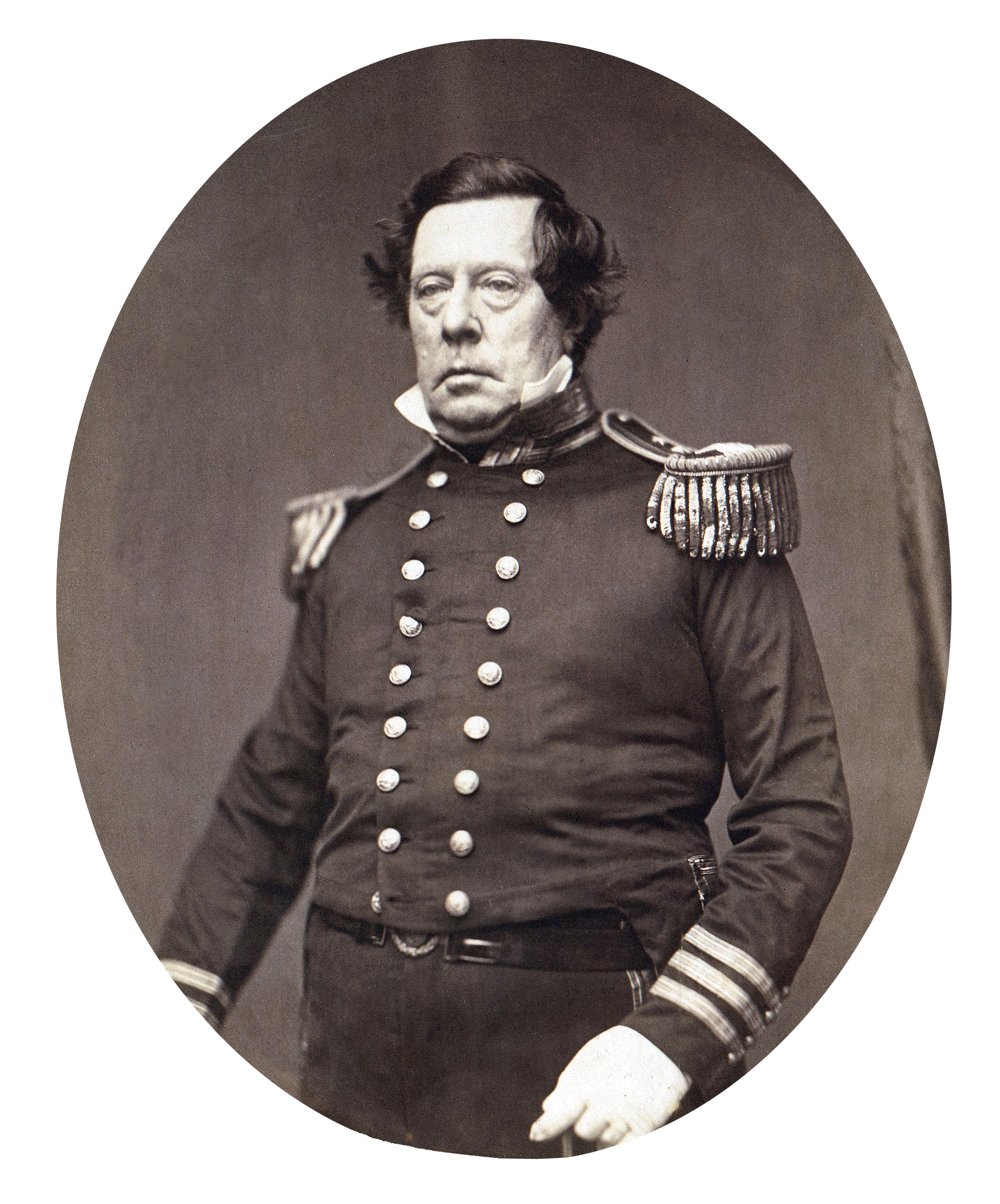
Matthew Calbraith Perry

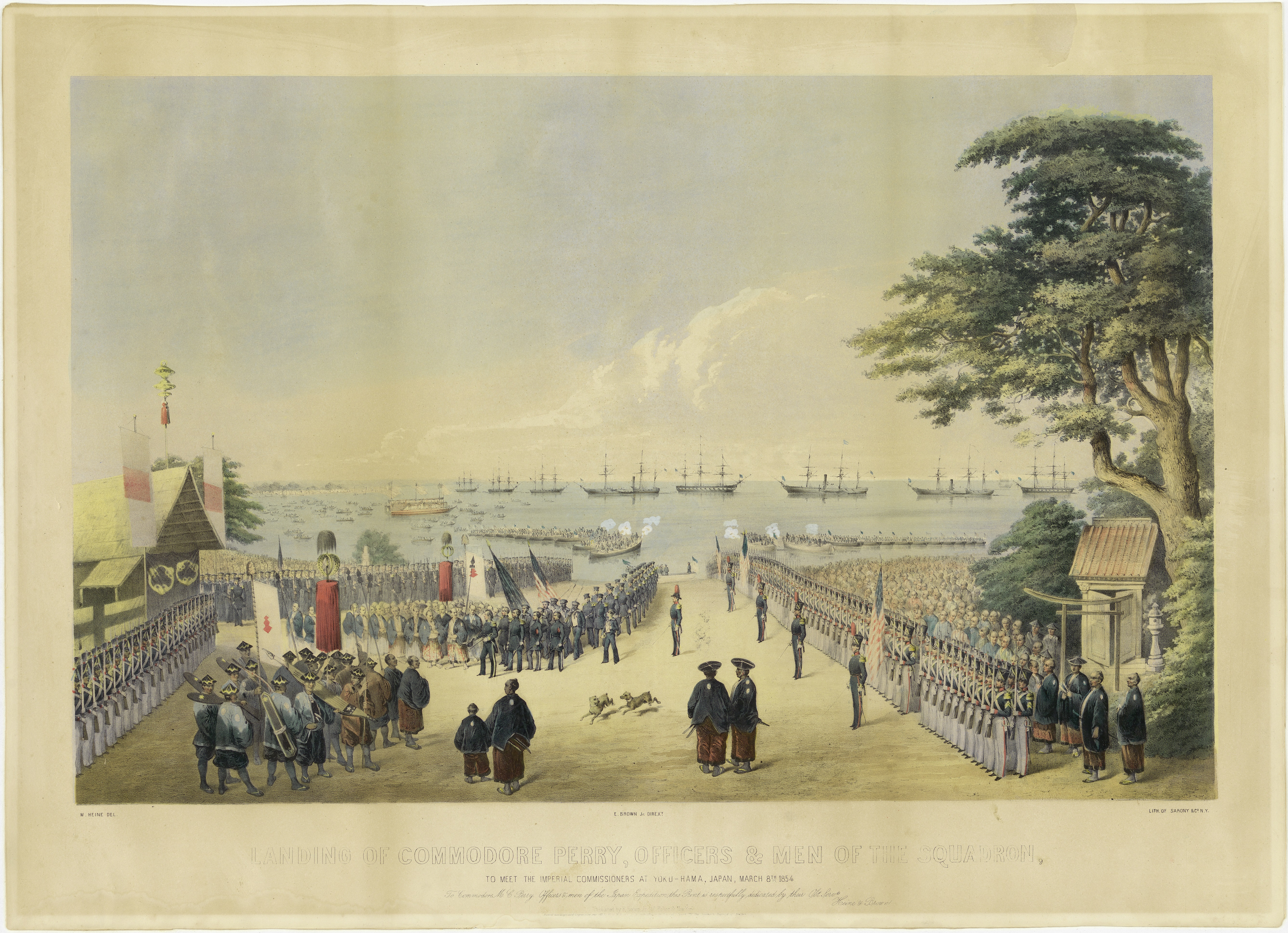
Landing of Commodore Perry, Officers and Men of the Squadron To meet the Imperial Commissioners at Kurihama Yokosuka 8 March 1854

When Commodore Matthew C. Perry's four-ship squadron appeared in Edo Bay in July 1853, the bakufu was thrown into turmoil. The chairman of the senior councillors, Abe Masahiro (1819–1857), was responsible for dealing with the Americans. Having no precedent to manage this threat to national security, Abe tried to balance the desires of the senior councillors to compromise with the foreigners, of the emperor who wanted to keep the foreigners out, and of the daimyo who wanted to go to war. Lacking consensus, Abe decided to compromise by accepting Perry's demands for opening Japan to foreign trade while also making military preparations. In March 1854, the Treaty of Peace and Amity (or Treaty of Kanagawa) opened two ports to American ships seeking provisions, guaranteed good treatment to shipwrecked American sailors, and allowed a United States consul to take up residence in Shimoda, a seaport on the Izu Peninsula, southwest of Edo.

The resulting damage to the bakufu was significant. The devalued price of gold in Japan was one immediate, enormous effect. The European and American traders purchased gold for its original price on the world market and then sold it to the Japanese for triple the price. Along with this, cheap goods from these developed nations, like finished cotton, flooded the market and forced many Japanese out of business. Debate over government policy was unusual and had engendered public criticism of the bakufu. In the hope of enlisting the support of new allies, Abe, to the consternation of the fudai, had consulted with the shinpan and tozama daimyo, further undermining the already weakened bakufu. In the Ansei Reform (1854–1856), Abe then tried to strengthen the regime by ordering Dutch warships and armaments from the Netherlands and building new port defenses. In 1855, a naval training school with Dutch instructors was set up at Nagasaki, and a Western-style military school was established at Edo; by the next year, the government was translating Western books. Opposition to Abe increased within fudai circles, which opposed opening bakufu councils to tozama daimyo, and he was replaced in 1855 as chairman of the senior councilors by Hotta Masayoshi (1810–1864).

At the head of the dissident faction was Tokugawa Nariaki, who had long embraced a militant loyalty to the emperor along with anti-foreign sentiments, and who had been put in charge of national defense in 1854. The Mito school—based on neo-Confucian and Shinto principles—had as its goal the restoration of the imperial institution, the spurning of the West, and the founding of a world empire under the divine imperial house.

In the final years of the Tokugawas, foreign contact increased as more concessions were granted. The Harris Treaty, forced on the bakufu in 1858, secured the privilege of Americans to reside and travel in a limited number of areas. The treaty also banned the opium trade, established extremely low tariffs favorable to American merchants, and guaranteed extraterritoriality for American citizens in Japan. Tokugawa Nariaki opposed the signing of the new treaty, and Hotta, lacking the support of key daimyo, sought imperial sanction. The court officials, perceiving the weakness of the bakufu, rejected Hotta's request and thus suddenly embroiled Kyoto and the emperor in Japan's internal politics for the first time in many centuries.

When the shōgun died without an heir, Nariaki appealed to the court for support of his own son, Tokugawa Yoshinobu, for shōgun, a candidate favored by the shinpan and tozama daimyo. The fudai won the power struggle, however, installing Tokugawa Yoshitomi, arresting Nariaki and Yoshinobu, executing Yoshida Shōin (1830–1859), a leading sonnō-jōi intellectual who had opposed the American treaty and plotted a revolution against the bakufu, and signing treaties with the United States and five other nations, thus ending more than 200 years of exclusion.

Recently some scholars have suggested that there were more events that spurred this opening of Japan. Yoshimune, eighth Tokugawa shōgun from 1716 to 1745, started the first Kyōhō reforms in an attempt to gain more revenue for the government. In 1767 to 1786 Tanuma Okitsugu also initiated some unorthodox economic reforms to expand government income. This led his conservative opponents to attack him and take his position as he was forced from government in disgrace. Similarly, Matsudaira Sadanobu launched the Kansei Reforms in 1787–1793 to stabilize rice prices, cut government costs, and increase revenues. The final economic reform of the Tenpō era of 1841–1843 had similar objectives. Most were ineffective and only worked in some areas. These economic failings would also have been a force in the opening of Japan, as Japanese businessmen desired larger markets. Some scholars also point to internal activism for political change. The Mito school had long been an active force in demanding political changes, such as restoring the powers of the Emperor. This anger can also be seen in the poetry of Matsuo Taseko (a woman who farmed silkworms in the Ina Valley) from Hirata Atsutane's School of National Learning:

It is disgusting
the agitation over thread
In today's world
Ever since the ships
from foreign countries
came for the jeweled
silkworm cocoons
to the land of the gods and the Emperor
Peoples hearts
awesome though they are,
are being pulled apart
and consumed by rage.

— Matsuo Taseko, Gordon 2008, p. 52

This inspired many anti-Tokugawa activists as they blamed the bakufu for impoverishing the people and dishonoring the emperor.

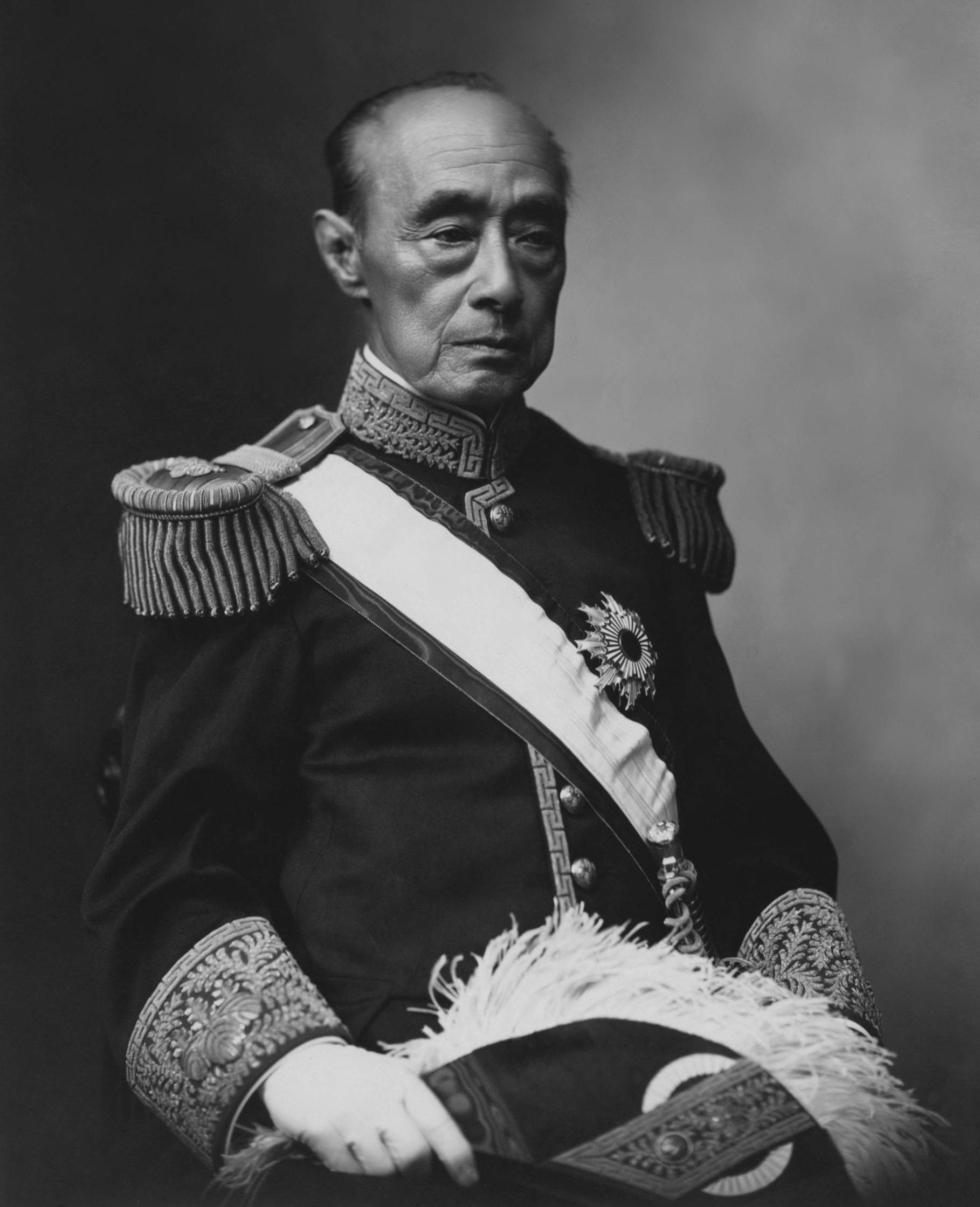
Tokugawa Yoshinobu in later life

=== Bakumatsu modernization and conflicts ===
During the last years of the bakufu, or bakumatsu, the bakufu took strong measures to try to reassert its dominance, although its involvement with modernization and foreign powers was to make it a target of anti-Western sentiment throughout the country.

The army and the navy were modernized. A naval training school was established in Nagasaki in 1855. Naval students were sent to study in Western naval schools for several years, starting a tradition of foreign-educated future leaders, such as Admiral Enomoto. French naval engineers were hired to build naval arsenals, such as Yokosuka and Nagasaki. By the end of the Tokugawa shogunate in 1868, the Japanese navy of the shōgun already possessed eight Western-style steam warships around the flagship Kaiyō Maru, which were used against pro-imperial forces during the Boshin War under the command of Admiral Enomoto. A French military mission was established to help modernize the armies of the bakufu.

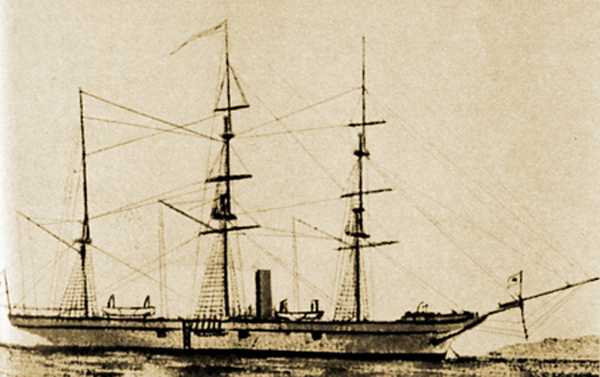
Kanrin Maru, Japan's first screw-driven steam warship, 1855

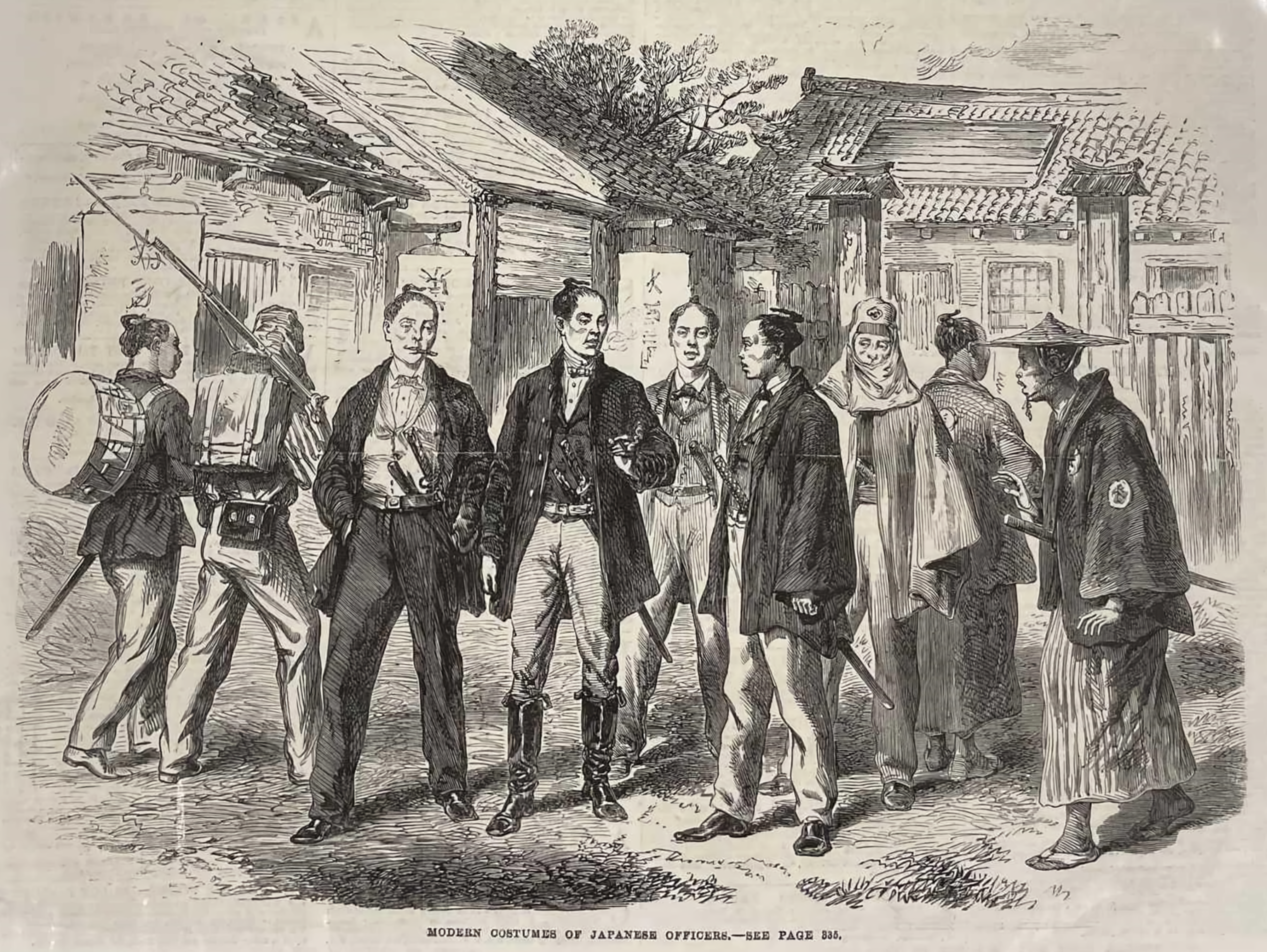
Samurai in western clothing of the Tokugawa Shogunate Army (1866)

Revering the emperor as a symbol of unity, extremists wrought violence and death against the Bakufu and Han authorities and foreigners. Foreign naval retaliation in the Anglo-Satsuma War led to still another concessionary commercial treaty in 1865, but Yoshitomi was unable to enforce the Western treaties. A bakufu army was defeated when it was sent to crush dissent in the Satsuma and Chōshū Domains in 1866. Finally, in 1867, Emperor Kōmei died and was succeeded by his underaged son Emperor Meiji.

Tokugawa Yoshinobu reluctantly became head of the Tokugawa house and shōgun. He tried to reorganize the government under the emperor while preserving the shōgun's leadership role. Fearing the growing power of the Satsuma and Chōshū daimyo, other daimyo called for returning the shōgun's political power to the emperor and a council of daimyo chaired by the former Tokugawa shōgun. Yoshinobu accepted the plan in late 1867 and resigned, announcing an "imperial restoration". The Satsuma, Chōshū, and other han leaders and radical courtiers, however, rebelled, seized the imperial palace, and announced their own restoration on 3 January 1868.

Following the Boshin War (1868–1869), the bakufu was abolished, and Yoshinobu was reduced to the ranks of the common daimyo. Resistance continued in the North throughout 1868, and the bakufu naval forces under Admiral Enomoto Takeaki continued to hold out for another six months in Hokkaido, where they founded the short-lived Republic of Ezo.

Although the Edo Period would soon end, Bushido values would continue to influence Japanese society long after the samurai ceased to exist.

The Edo Period would also have a lasting impact on modern art and culture. The Edo Period lives on in plays, books, anime, and especially jidaigeki (historical period dramas), such as the classic samurai films of Akira Kurosawa. Kurosawa's films would influence Spaghetti Westerns, and even Star Wars.

== Events ==
- 1600: Battle of Sekigahara. Tokugawa Ieyasu defeats a coalition of daimyo and establishes hegemony over most of Japan.
- 1603: The emperor appoints Tokugawa Ieyasu as shōgun, who moves his government to Edo (Tokyo) and founds the Tokugawa dynasty of shōguns.
- 1605: Tokugawa Ieyasu resigns as shōgun and is succeeded by his son Tokugawa Hidetada.
- 1607: The Korean Joseon dynasty sends an embassy to Tokugawa shogunate.
- 1611: Ryūkyū Islands become a vassal state of Satsuma Domain.
- 1614: Tokugawa Ieyasu bans Christianity from Japan.
- 1615: Battle of Osaka. Tokugawa Ieyasu besieges Osaka Castle, all opposition from forces loyal to the Toyotomi family. Tokugawa authority becomes paramount throughout Japan.
- 1616: Tokugawa Ieyasu dies.
- 1620: After Ieyasu dies, the peasants and chōnin increase in population.
- 1623: Tokugawa Iemitsu becomes the third shōgun.
- 1633: Iemitsu forbids travelling abroad and reading foreign books.
- 1635: Iemitsu formalizes the system of mandatory alternative residence (sankin-kōtai) in Edo.
- 1637: Shimabara Rebellion (1637–38) mounted by overtaxed peasants.
- 1638: Iemitsu forbids ship building.
- 1639: Edicts establishing National Seclusion (Sakoku Rei) are completed. All Westerners except the Dutch are prohibited from entering Japan.
- 1641: Iemitsu bans all foreigners, except Chinese, Koreans, and Dutch from Japan.
- 1651: Keian Uprising, a failed Rōnin rebellion against the shogunate led by ronin martial arts instructors Marubashi Chūya and Yui Shōsetsu following Tokugawa Iemitsu's death in 1651.
- 1657: The Great Fire of Meireki destroys most of the city of Edo.
- 1686: Jōkyō uprising, a failed peasant uprising in Azumidaira (part of the Matsumoto Domain at the time) caused by heavy taxation.
- 1700: Kabuki and ukiyo-e become popular.
- 1707: Mount Fuji erupts.
- 1774: The anatomical text Kaitai Shinsho, the first complete Japanese translation of a Western medical work, is published by Sugita Genpaku and Maeno Ryotaku.
- 1787: Matsudaira Sadanobu becomes senior shogunal councillor and institutes the Kansei Reforms.
- 1792: Russian envoy Adam Laxman arrives at Nemuro in eastern Ezo (now Hokkaido).
- 1804: Russian envoy Nikolai Rezanov reaches Nagasaki and unsuccessfully seeks the establishment of trade relations with Japan.
- 1837: Rebellion of Ōshio Heihachirō.
- 1841: Tenpō Reforms.
- 1853: US Navy Commodore Matthew C. Perry's four-ship squadron appeared in Edo Bay (Tokyo Bay).
- 1854: The US forces Japan to sign a trade agreement ("Treaty of Kanagawa") which reopens Japan to foreigners after two centuries.
- 1855: Russia and Japan establish diplomatic relations.
- 1860: Sakuradamon Incident.
- 1862: Namamugi Incident. (Also followed with the Sakashita Gate Incident)
- 1863: Bombardment of Kagoshima.
- 1864: British, French, Dutch and American warships bombard Shimonoseki and open more Japanese ports for foreigners.
- 1868: Tokugawa Yoshinobu resigns, the Tokugawa dynasty ends, and the emperor (or "mikado") Meiji is restored, but with the capital in Edo/Tokyo and divine attributes.

=== Era names ===
The imperial eras proclaimed during the Edo period were:

Eras during the Edo period
Era name	Japanese kanji	Approximate years
Keichō	慶長	1596～1615
Genna	元和	1615～1624
Kan'ei	寛永	1624～1644
Shōhō	正保	1644～1648
Keian	慶安	1648～1652
Jōō	承応	1652～1655
Meireki	明暦	1655～1658
Manji	万治	1658～1661
Kanbun	寛文	1661～1673
Enpō	延宝	1673～1681
Tenna	天和	1681～1684
Jōkyō	貞享	1684～1688
Genroku	元禄	1688～1704
Hōei	宝永	1704～1711
Shōtoku	正徳	1711～1716
Kyōhō	享保	1716～1736
Genbun	元文	1736～1741
Kanpō	寛保	1741～1744
Enkyō	延享	1744～1748
Kan'en	寛延	1748～1751
Hōreki	宝暦	1751～1764
Meiwa	明和	1764～1772
An'ei	安永	1772～1781
Tenmei	天明	1781～1789
Kansei	寛政	1789～1801
Kyōwa	享和	1801～1804
Bunka	文化	1804～1818
Bunsei	文政	1818～1830
Tenpō	天保	1830～1844
Kōka	弘化	1844～1848
Kaei	嘉永	1848～1854
Ansei	安政	1854～1860
Man'en	万延	1860～1861
Bunkyū	文久	1861～1864
Genji	元治	1864～1865
Keiō	慶応	1865～1868

== In popular culture ==
The Edo period is the setting of many works of popular culture. These include novels, comics, stageplays, films, television shows, animated works, and manga.

There is a cultural theme park called Edo Wonderland Nikko Edomura in the Kinugawa Onsen area of Nikkō, Tochigi, north of Tokyo.

== See also ==
- Criminal punishment in Edo-period Japan
- Edomoji, Japanese lettering styles invented in the Edo period
- Ee ja nai ka, an outbreak of mass hysteria at the end of the Edo period
- Gonin Gumi, groups of five households that were held collectively responsible during the Edo period
- Jidaigeki, Japanese period dramas which are usually set in the Edo period
- Jitte (weapon), law enforcement weapon unique to the period
- Karakuri ningyō, Japanese automatons

== General and cited sources ==
- Birmingham Museum of Art (2010), Birmingham Museum of Art: guide to the collection, Birmingham, Alabama: Birmingham Museum of Art, ISBN 978-1-904832-77-5
- Beasley, William G. (1972), The Meiji Restoration, Stanford, California: Stanford University Press, ISBN 0-8047-0815-0
- Diamond, Jared (2005), Collapse: How Societies Choose to Fail or Succeed, New York, N.Y.: Penguin Books, ISBN 0-14-303655-6
- Frédéric, Louis (2002), Japan Encyclopedia, Harvard University Press Reference Library, Belknap, ISBN 9780674017535
- Flath, David (2000), The Japanese Economy, New York: Oxford University Press, ISBN 0-19-877504-0
- Gordon, Andrew (2008), A Modern History of Japan: From Tokugawa Times to Present (Second ed.), New York: Oxford University Press, ISBN 978-0-19-533922-2, archived from the original on 6 February 2010
- Hall, J.W.; McClain, J.L. (1991), The Cambridge History of Japan, Cambridge University Press, ISBN 9780521223553
- Iwao, Nagasaki (2015). "Clad in the aesthetics of tradition: from kosode to kimono". In Jackson, Anna (ed.). Kimono: the art and evolution of Japanese fashion. London: Thames & Hudson. pp. 8–11. ISBN 9780500518021. OCLC 990574229.
- Jackson, Anna (2015). "Dress in the Edo period: the evolution of fashion". In Jackson, Anna (ed.). Kimono: the art and evolution of Japanese fashion. London: Thames & Hudson. pp. 20–103. ISBN 9780500518021. OCLC 990574229.
- Jansen, Marius B. (2002), The Making of Modern Japan (Paperback ed.), Belknap Press of Harvard University Press, ISBN 0-674-00991-6
- Lewis, James Bryant (2003), Frontier Contact Between Choson Korea and Tokugawa Japan, London: Routledge, ISBN 0-7007-1301-8
- Longstreet, Stephen; Longstreet, Ethel (1989), Yoshiwara: the pleasure quarters of old Tokyo, Yenbooks, Rutland, Vermont: Tuttle Publishing, ISBN 0-8048-1599-2
- Nussbaum, Louis-Frédéric (2002). Japan Encyclopedia. Harvard University Press reference library. Translated by Roth, Käthe. Cambridge, Mass.: Harvard University Press. ISBN 978-0-674-01753-5.
- Seigle, Cecilia Segawa (1993), Yoshiwara: The Glittering World of the Japanese Courtesan, Honolulu, Hawaii: University of Hawaii Press, ISBN 0-8248-1488-6
- Totman, Conrad (2000), A history of Japan (2nd ed.), Oxford: Blackwell, ISBN 9780631214472

Attribution

Japan

Preceded by Azuchi–Momoyama period	History of Japan; Edo period 1603–1868	Succeeded by Meiji era (Empire of Japan)
