= Rangaku =

Early modern study of Dutch learning in Japan

The Chinese characters (kanji) for "Rangaku". The first character "ran" is an abbreviation of the ateji for "Holland" (阿蘭陀, or with 2 Kanji 和蘭), o-ran-da; abbreviated to "ran" – because it is the emphasized syllable; cf. List of foreign place names in Japanese). The second character "gaku" means "study" and "learning".

Rangaku (Kyūjitai: 蘭學, (Note: Shinjitai/Modern Japanese: 蘭学) English: Dutch learning), and by extension Yōgaku (Japanese: 洋学; "Western learning"), is a body of knowledge developed by Japan through its contacts with the Dutch enclave of Dejima, which allowed Japan to keep abreast of Western technology and medicine in the period when the country was closed to foreigners from 1641 to 1853 because of the Tokugawa shogunate's policy of national isolation (sakoku).

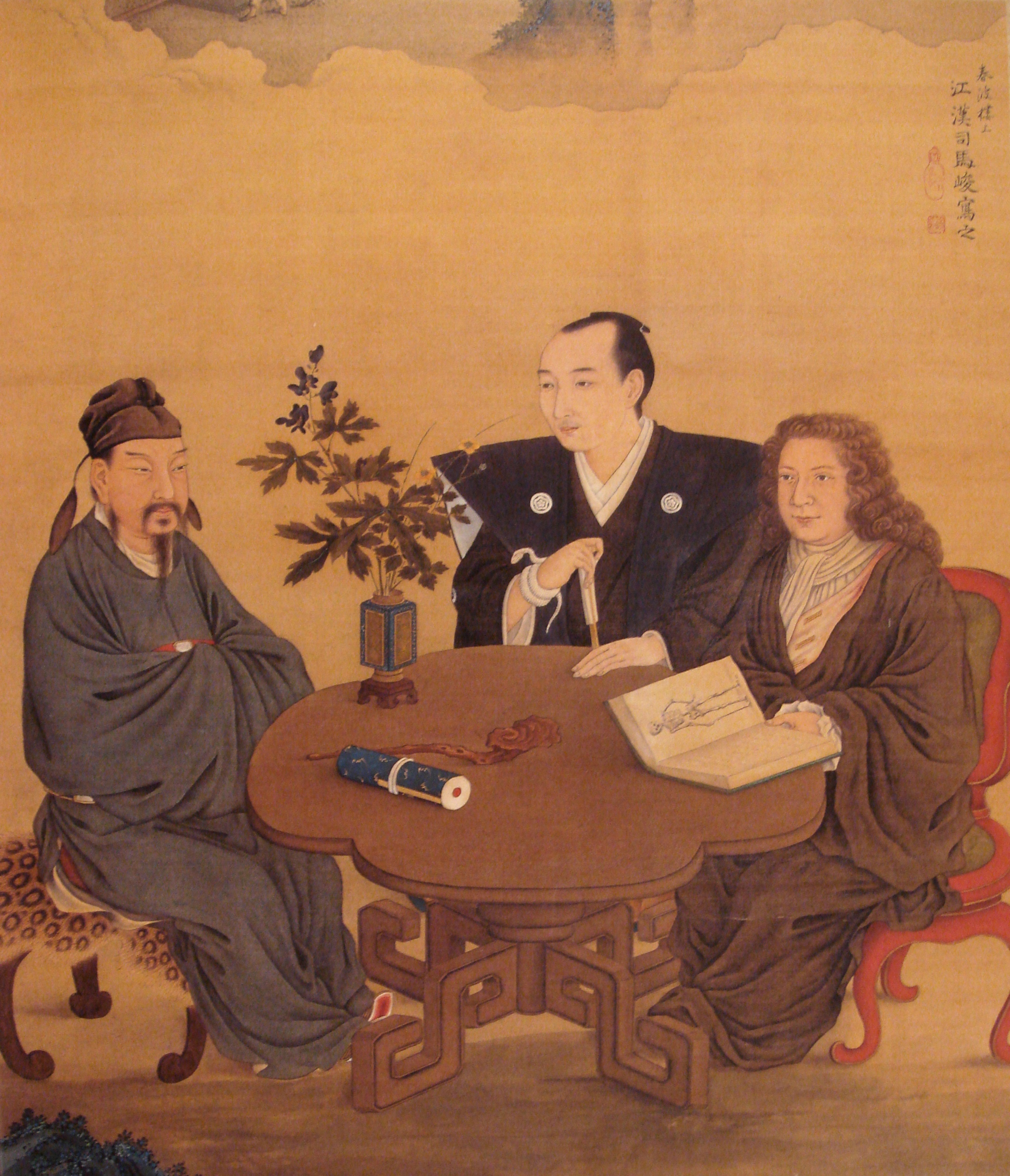
A meeting of Japan, China, and the West, Shiba Kōkan, late 18th century

Through Rangaku, some people in Japan learned many aspects of the scientific and technological revolution occurring in Europe at that time, helping the country build up the beginnings of a theoretical and technological scientific base, which helps to explain Japan's success in its radical and speedy modernization following the forced American opening of the country to foreign trade in 1854.

== History ==
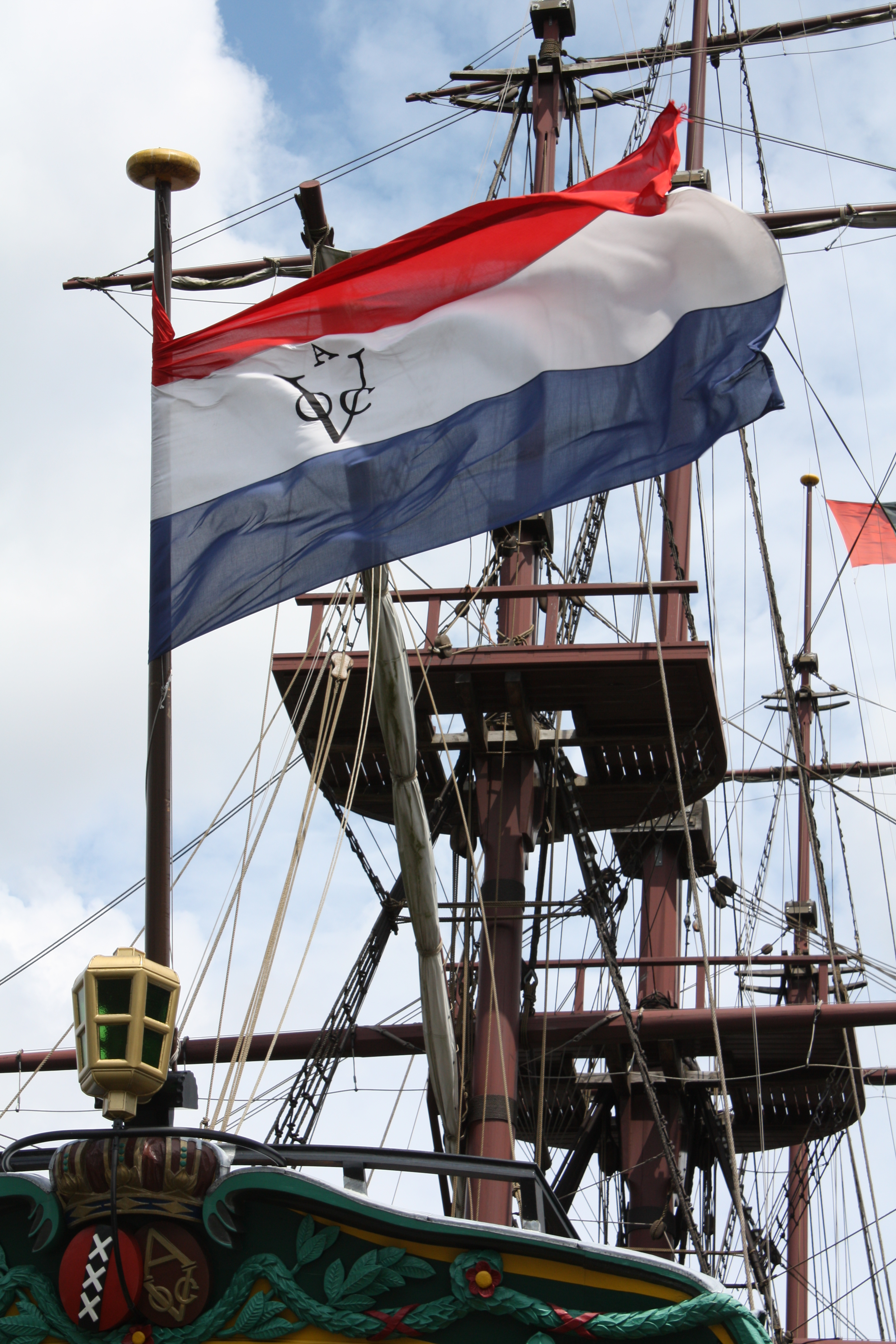
Replica of an East Indiaman of the Dutch East India Company/United East Indies Company (VOC)

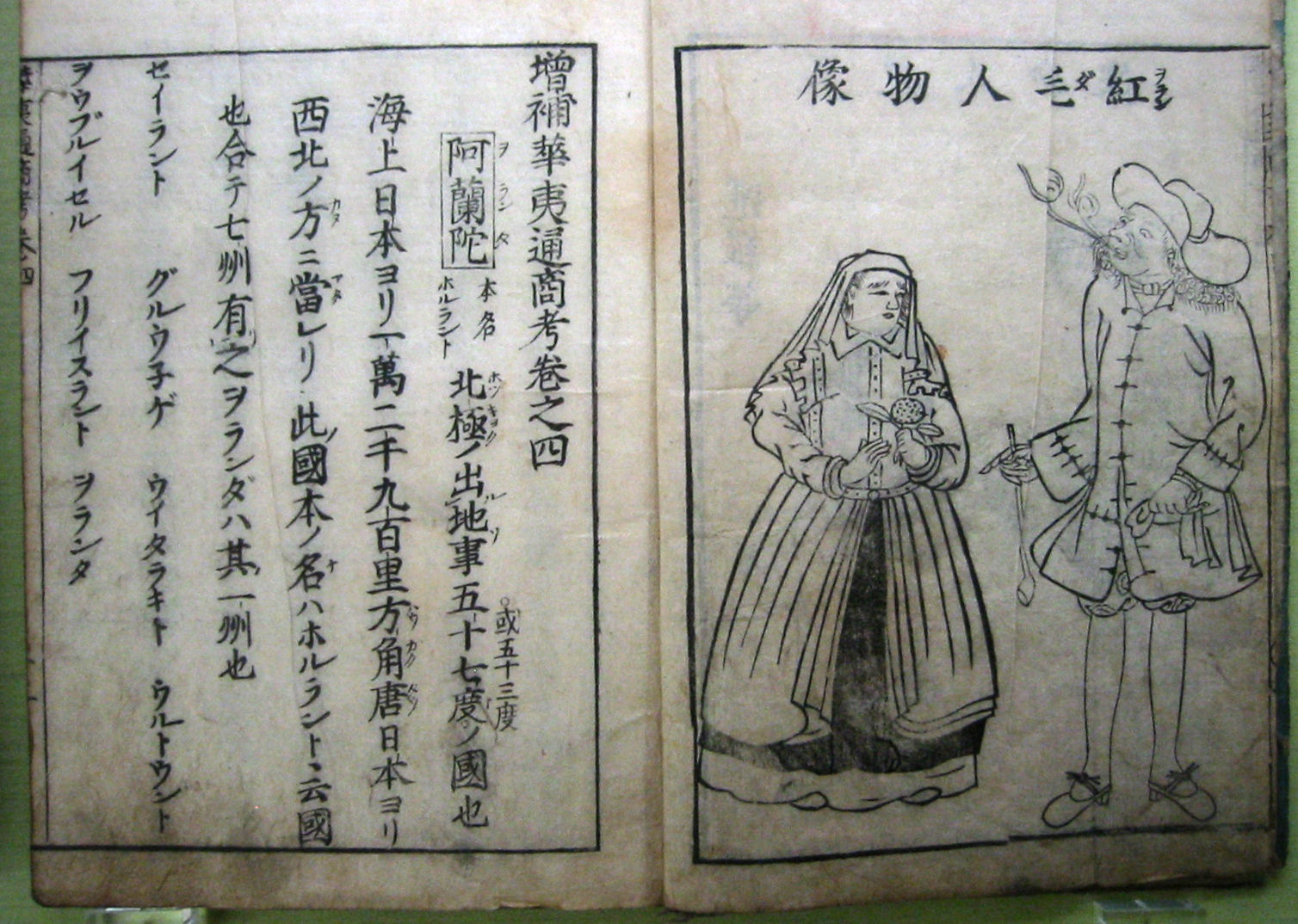
Account of Foreign Countries (増補華夷通商考, Zōho Kaitsū Shōkō), Nishikawa Joken, 1708. Tokyo National Museum

The Dutch traders at Dejima in Nagasaki were the only Europeans tolerated in Japan from 1639 until 1853 (the Dutch had a trading post in Hirado from 1609 till 1641 before they had to move to Dejima), and their movements were carefully watched and strictly controlled, being limited initially to one yearly trip to give their homage to the shōgun in Edo. They became instrumental, however, in transmitting to Japan some knowledge of the Industrial and Scientific Revolution that was occurring in Europe: In 1720 the ban on Dutch books was lifted and the Japanese purchased and translated scientific books from the Dutch, obtained from them Western curiosities and manufactures (such as clocks, medical instruments, celestial and terrestrial globes, maps and plant seeds) and received demonstrations of Western innovations, including of electrical phenomena, as well as the flight of a hot air balloon in the early 19th century. While other European countries faced ideological and political battles associated with the Protestant Reformation, the Netherlands were a free state, attracting leading thinkers such as René Descartes.

Altogether, thousands of such books were published, printed, and circulated. Japan had one of the largest urban populations in the world, with more than one million inhabitants in Edo, and many other large cities such as Osaka and Kyoto, offering a large, literate market to such novelties. In the large cities some shops, open to the general public, specialized in foreign curiosities.

=== Beginnings (1640–1720) ===
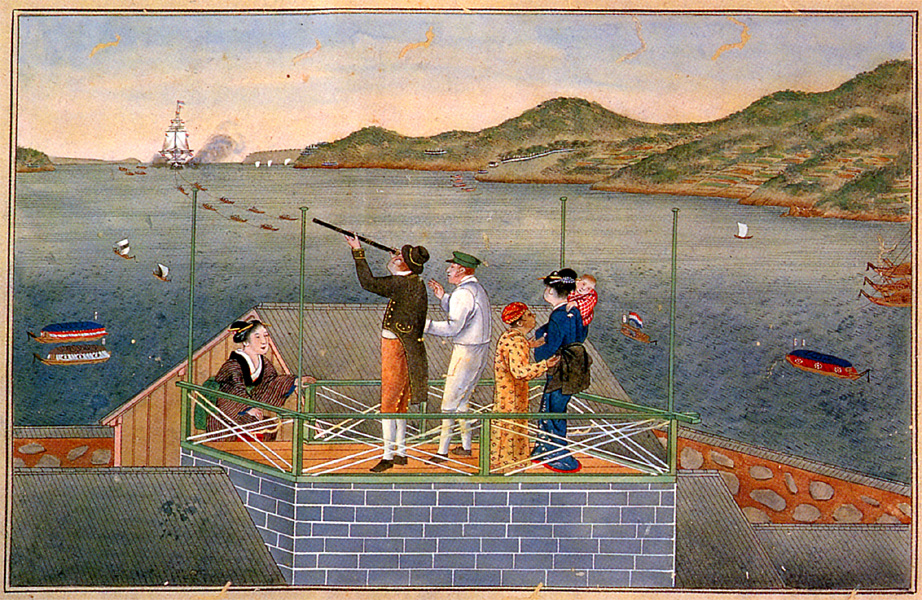
Painting by Kawahara Keiga: Arrival of a Dutch Ship. Philipp Franz von Siebold at Dejima with his Japanese wife Otaki and their baby daughter Ine observing a VOC ship in Nagasaki Bay using a telescope

The first phase of Rangaku was quite limited and highly controlled. After the relocation of the Dutch trading post to Dejima, trade as well as the exchange of information and the activities of the remaining Westerners (dubbed "Redhaired people" (kōmōjin)) were restricted considerably. Western books were prohibited, with the exemption of books on nautical and medical matters. Initially, a small group of hereditary Japanese–Dutch translators labored in Nagasaki to smooth communication with the foreigners and transmit bits of Western novelties.

The Dutch were requested to give updates of world events and to supply novelties to the shōgun every year on their trips to Edo. Finally, the Dutch factories in Nagasaki, in addition to their official trade work in silk and deer hides, were allowed to engage in some level of "private trade". A small, lucrative market for Western curiosities thus developed, focused on the Nagasaki area. With the establishment of a permanent post for a surgeon at the Dutch trading post Dejima, high-ranking Japanese officials started to ask for treatment in cases when local doctors were of no help. One of the most important surgeons was Caspar Schamberger, who induced a continuing interest in medical books, instruments, pharmaceuticals, treatment methods etc. During the second half of the 17th century high-ranking officials ordered telescopes, clocks, oil paintings, microscopes, spectacles, maps, globes, birds, dogs, donkeys, and other rarities for their personal entertainment and for scientific studies.

=== Liberalization of Western knowledge (1720–1838) ===
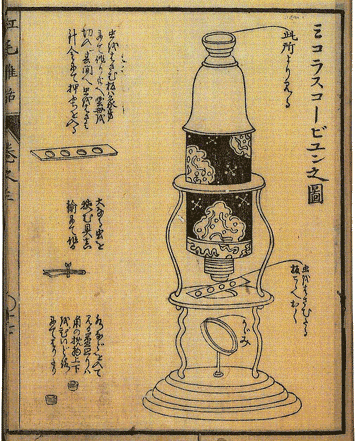
Description of a microscope in Various stories about the Dutch (紅毛雑話), 1787

Although most Western books were forbidden from 1640, rules were relaxed under shōgun Tokugawa Yoshimune in 1720, which started an influx of Dutch books and their translations into Japanese. One example is the 1787 publication of Morishima Chūryō’s Sayings of the Dutch (紅毛雑話, Kōmō Zatsuwa; lit. "Red Hair Chitchat"), recording much knowledge received from the Dutch. The book details a vast array of topics: it includes objects such as microscopes and hot air balloons; discusses Western hospitals and the state of knowledge of illness and disease; outlines techniques for painting and printing with copper plates; it describes the makeup of static electricity generators and large ships; and it relates updated geographical knowledge.

Between 1804 and 1829, schools opened throughout the country by the Shogunate (Bakufu) as well as terakoya (temple schools) helped spread the new ideas further.

By that time, Dutch emissaries and scientists were allowed much more free access to Japanese society. The German physician Philipp Franz von Siebold, attached to the Dutch delegation, established exchanges with Japanese students. He invited Japanese scientists to show them Western science. In 1824, von Siebold began a medical school in the outskirts of Nagasaki. Soon this Narutaki-juku (鳴滝塾) grew into a meeting place for about fifty students from all over the country. While receiving a thorough medical education they helped with the naturalistic studies of von Siebold.

=== Expansion and politicization (1839–present) ===
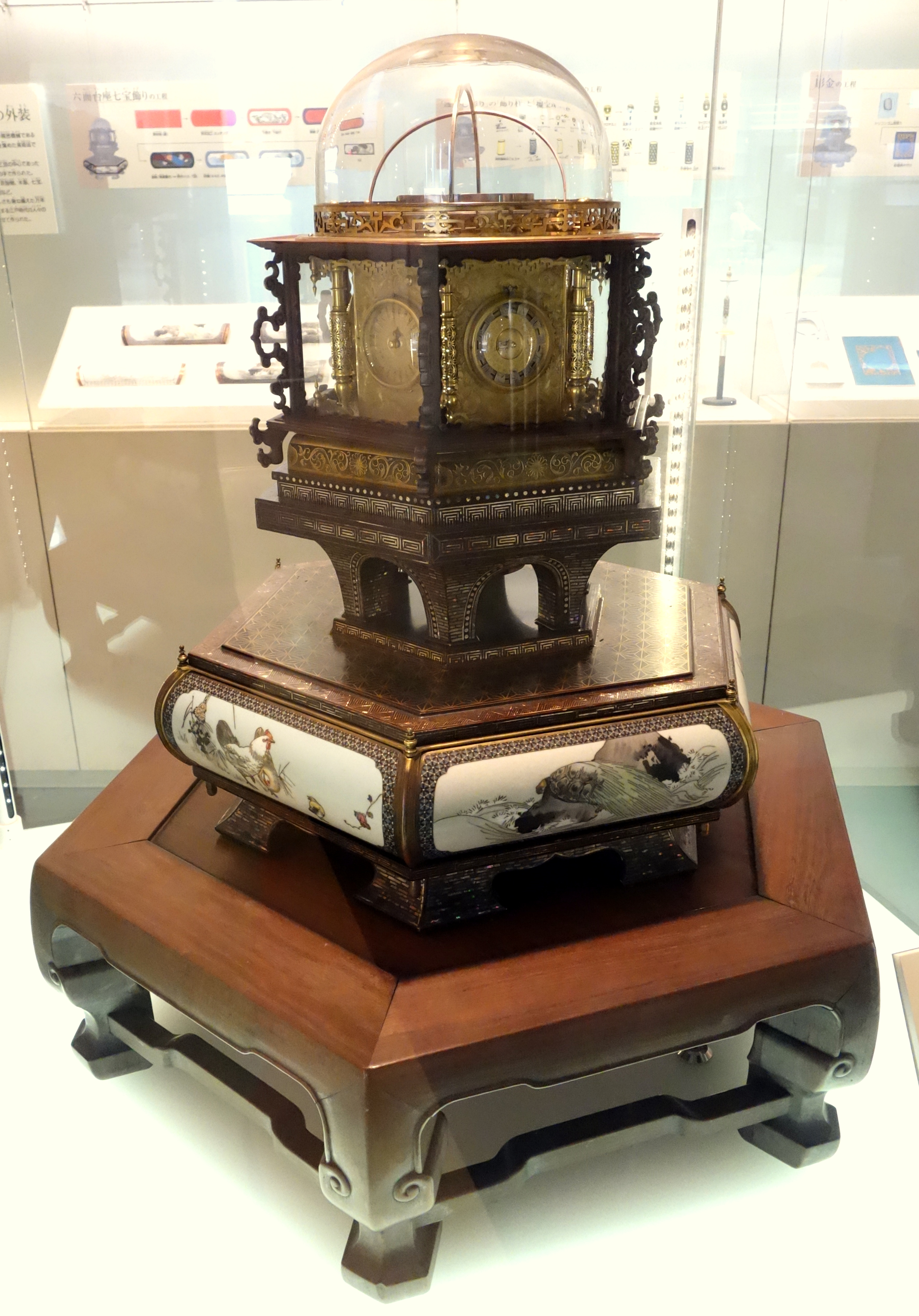
The Myriad year clock, a Japanese-made perpetual clock-watch (wadokei), made by Tanaka Hisashige in 1851 (National Museum of Nature and Science, Tokyo)

The Rangaku movement became increasingly involved in Japan's political debate over foreign isolation, arguing that the imitating of Western culture would strengthen rather than harm Japan. The Rangaku increasingly disseminated contemporary Western innovations.

In 1839, scholars of Western studies (called 蘭学者 "rangaku-sha") briefly suffered repression by the Edo shogunate in the Bansha no goku (蛮社の獄; roughly "imprisonment of the society for barbarian studies") incident, due to their opposition to the introduction of the death penalty against foreigners (other than Dutch) coming ashore, recently enacted by the Bakufu. The incident was provoked by actions such as the Morrison Incident, in which an unarmed American merchant ship was fired upon under the Edict to Repel Foreign Ships. The edict was eventually repealed in 1842.

Rangaku ultimately became obsolete when Japan opened up during the last decades of the Tokugawa regime (1853–67). Students were sent abroad, and foreign employees (o-yatoi gaikokujin) came to Japan to teach and advise in large numbers, leading to an unprecedented and rapid modernization of the country.

== Types ==
=== Medical sciences ===
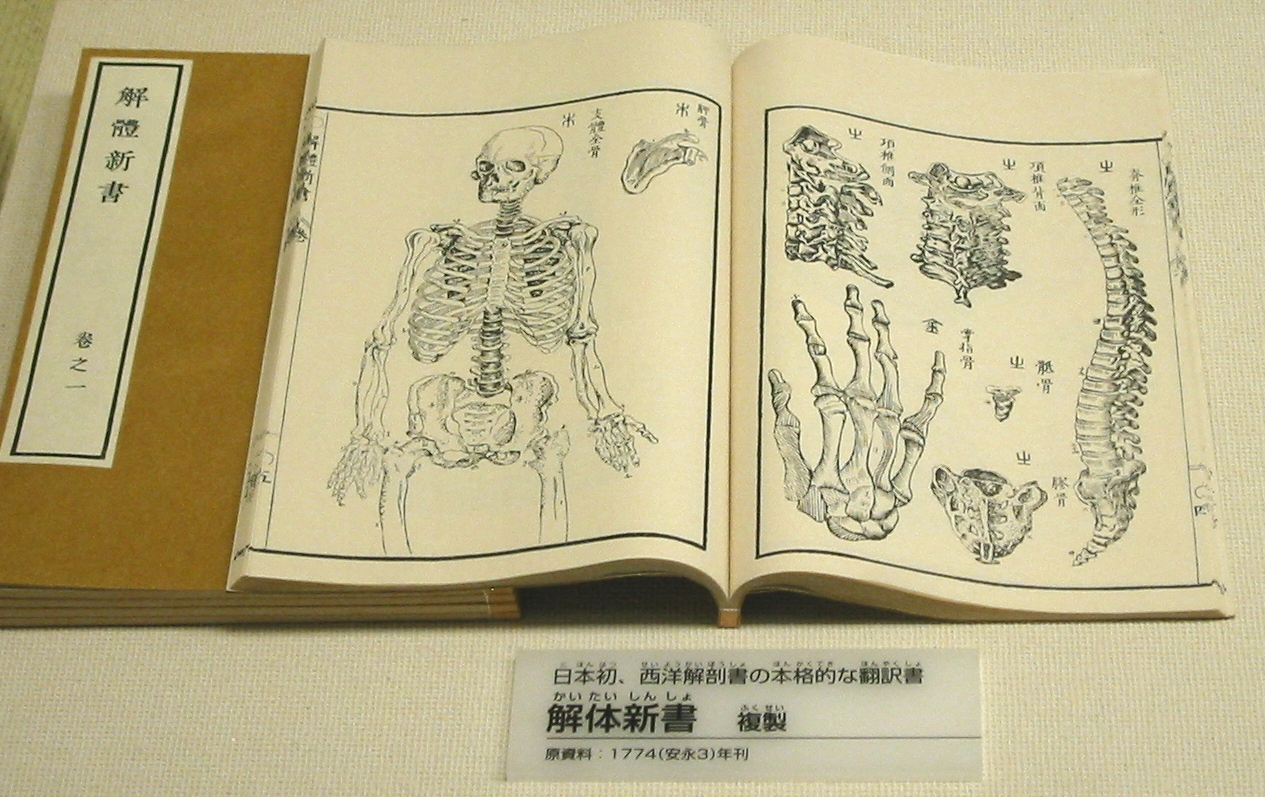
Japan's first full translation of a Western book on anatomy (Kaitai Shinsho), published in 1774 (National Museum of Nature and Science, Tokyo)

From around 1720, books on medical sciences were obtained from the Dutch, and then analyzed and translated into Japanese. Great debates occurred between the proponents of traditional Chinese medicine and those of the new Western learning, leading to waves of experiments and dissections. The accuracy of Western learning made a sensation among the population, and new publications such as the Anatomy (蔵志, Zōshi; lit. "Stored Will") of 1759 and the New Text on Anatomy (解体新書, Kaitai Shinsho; lit. "Understanding [of the] Body New Text") of 1774 became references. The latter was a compilation made by several Japanese scholars, led by Sugita Genpaku, mostly based on the Dutch-language Ontleedkundige Tafelen of 1734, itself a translation of Anatomische Tabellen (1732) by the German author Johann Adam Kulmus.

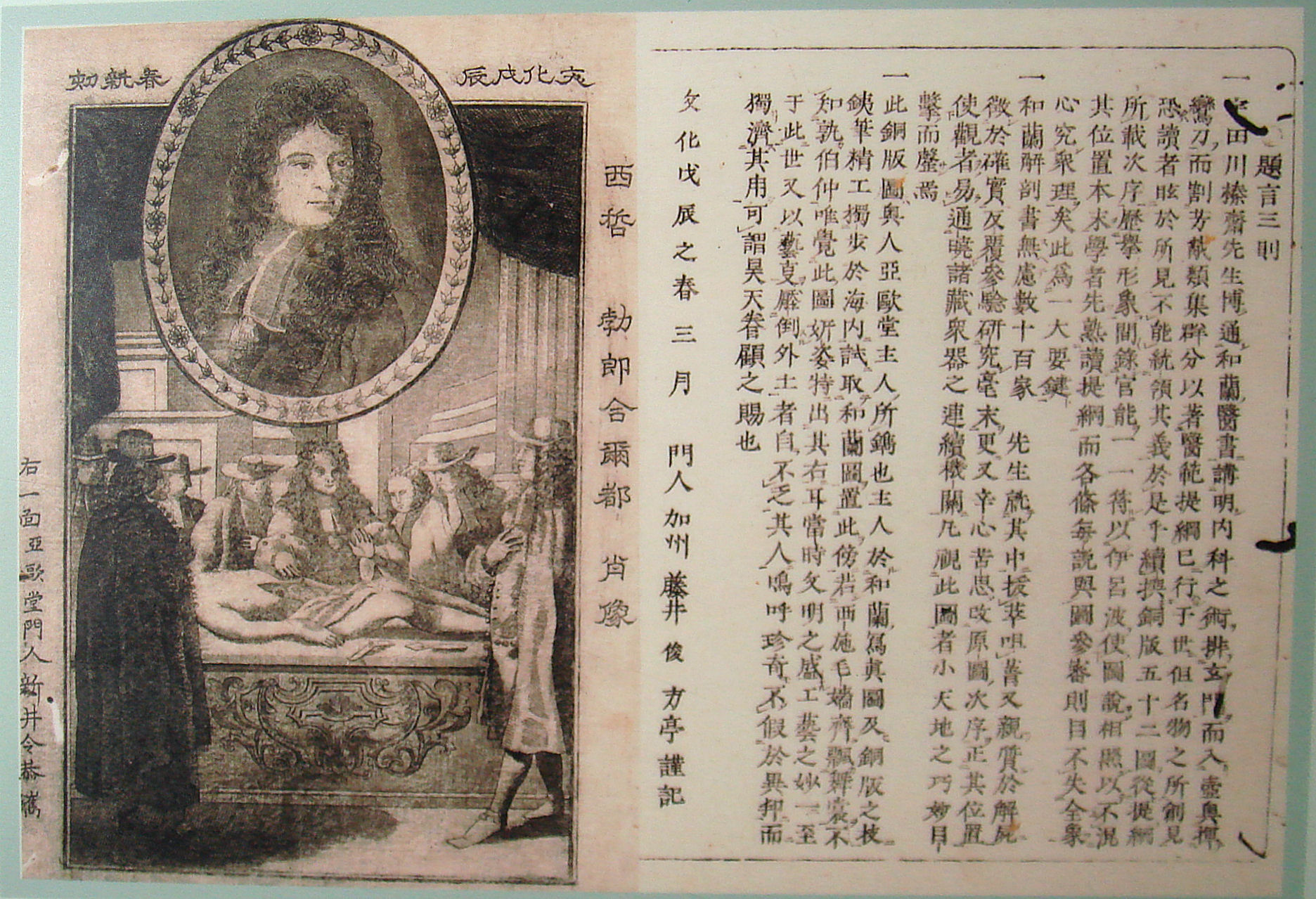
A Western book on medicine, translated into Kanbun, published in March 1808

In 1804, Hanaoka Seishū performed the world's first general anaesthesia during surgery for breast cancer (mastectomy). The surgery involved combining Chinese herbal medicine and Western surgery techniques, 40 years before the better-known Western innovations of Long, Wells and Morton, with the introduction of diethyl ether (1846) and chloroform (1847) as general anaesthetics.

In 1838, the physician and scholar Ogata Kōan established the Rangaku school named Tekijuku. Famous alumni of the Tekijuku include Fukuzawa Yukichi and Ōtori Keisuke, who would become key players in Japan's modernization. He was the author of 1849's Introduction to the Study of Disease (病学通論, Byōgaku Tsūron), which was the first book on Western pathology to be published in Japan.

=== Physical sciences ===
Some of the first scholars of Rangaku were involved with the assimilation of 17th century theories in the physical sciences. This is the case of Shizuki Tadao (ja:志筑忠雄) an eighth-generation descendant of the Shizuki house of Nagasaki Dutch translators, who after having completed for the first time a systematic analysis of Dutch grammar, went on to translate the Dutch edition of Introductio ad Veram Physicam of the British author John Keil on the theories of Newton (Japanese title: Rekishō Shinsho (暦象新書; roughly: "New Text on Transitive Effects"), 1798). Shizuki coined several key scientific terms for the translation, which are still in use in modern Japanese; for example, "gravity" (重力, jūryoku), "attraction" (引力, inryoku) (as in electromagnetism), and "centrifugal force" (遠心力, enshinryoku). A second Rangaku scholar, Hoashi Banri (ja:帆足万里), published a manual of physical sciences in 1810 – Kyūri-Tsū (窮理通; roughly "On Natural Laws") – based on a combination of thirteen Dutch books, after learning Dutch from just one Dutch-Japanese dictionary.

=== Electrical sciences ===
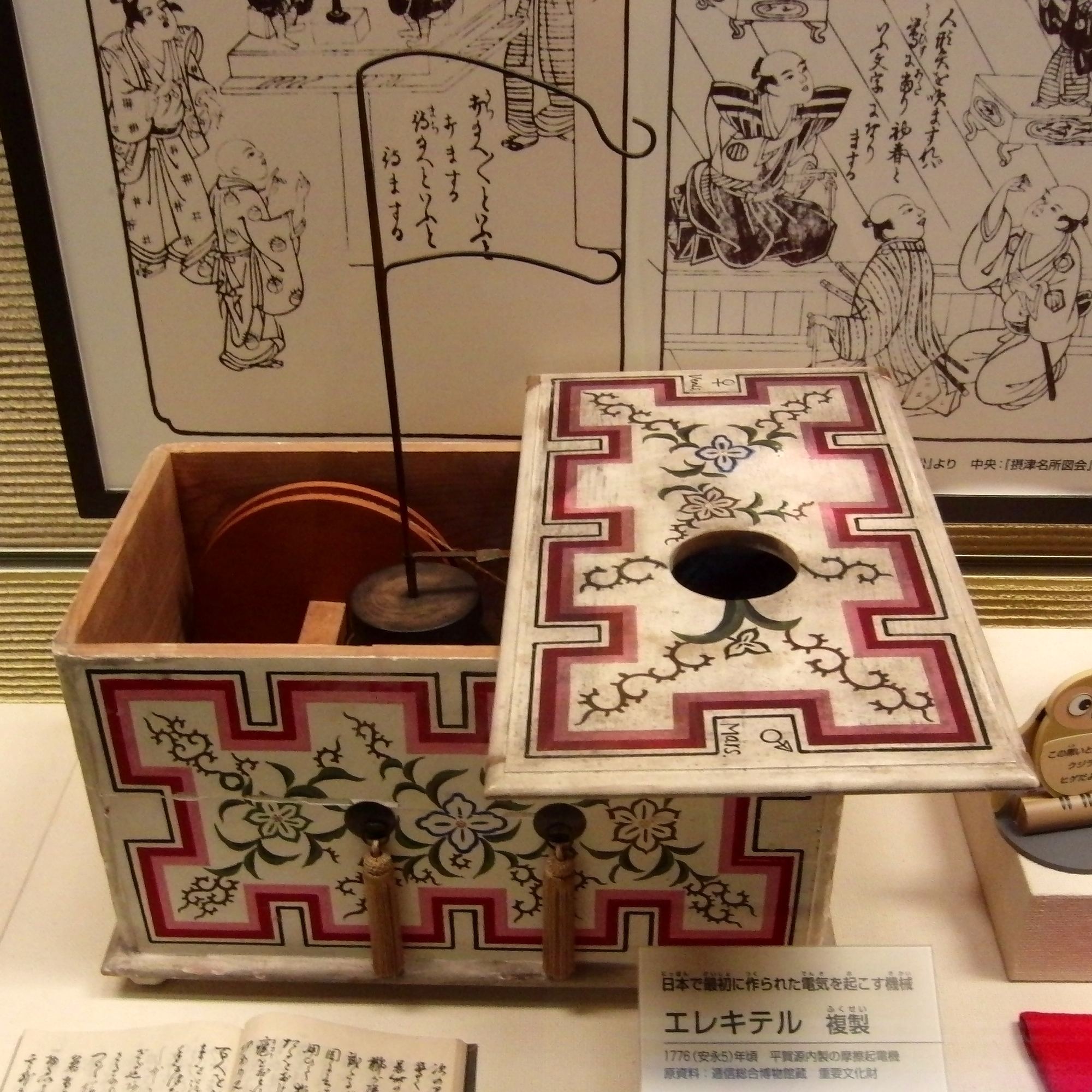
Japan's first electrostatic generator (1776), called Elekiteru, developed through Rangaku (National Museum of Nature and Science)

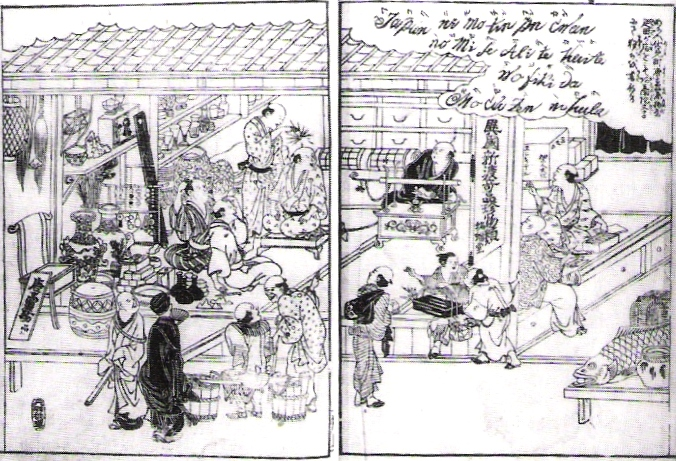
A curio shop in Osaka demonstrating and selling an Elekiteru. The sign at the entrance says "Newest curiosities from foreign countries."

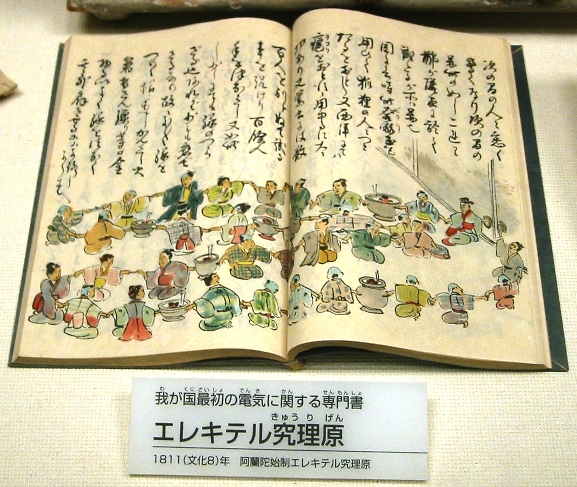
A later copy of Japan's first manual on electric phenomena by Hashimoto Soukichi, originally written in 1811

Electrical experiments were widely popular from around 1770. Following the invention of the Leyden jar in 1745, similar electrostatic generators were obtained for the first time in Japan from the Dutch around 1770 by Hiraga Gennai. Static electricity was produced by the friction of a glass tube with a gold-plated stick, creating electrical effects. The jars were reproduced and adapted by the Japanese, who called it "Elekiteru" (エレキテル, Erekiteru). As in Europe, these generators were used as curiosities, such as making sparks fly from the head of a subject or for supposed pseudoscientific medical advantages. In Sayings of the Dutch, the elekiteru is described as a machine that allows one to take sparks out of the human body, to treat sick parts. Elekiterus were sold widely to the public in curiosity shops. Many electric machines derived from the elekiteru were then invented, particularly by Sakuma Shōzan.

Japan's first electricity manual, Fundamentals of the elekiteru Mastered by the Dutch (阿蘭陀始制エレキテル究理原, Oranda Shisei Erekiteru Kyūri-Gen) by Hashimoto Soukichi (ja:橋本宗吉), written in 1811 (and never published and only manually transcribed copies remain), describes electrical phenomena, such as experiments with electric generators, conductivity through the human body, and the 1750 experiments of Benjamin Franklin with lightning.

=== Chemistry ===
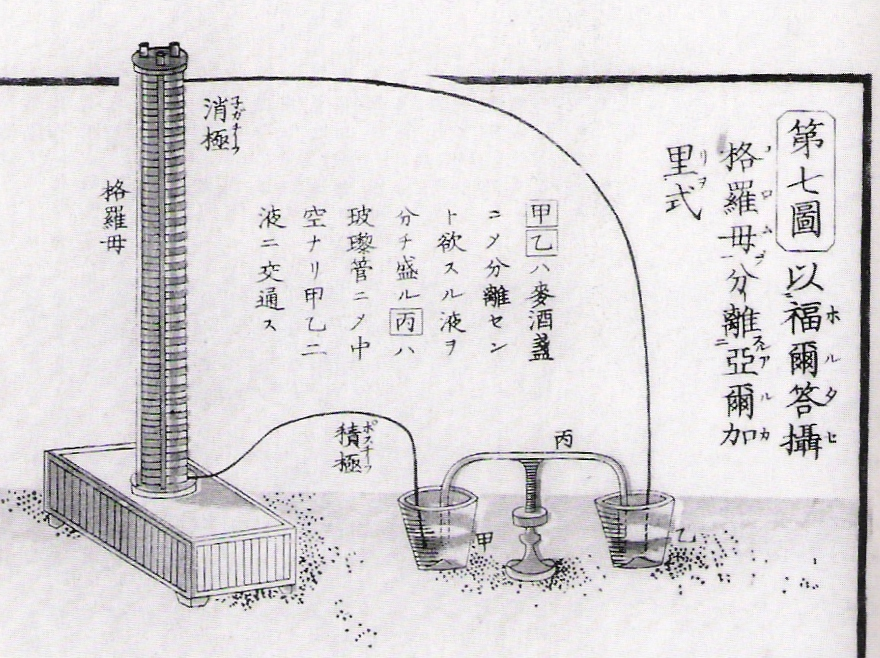
A description of a Volta battery in Udagawa's Opening Principles of Chemistry, published in 1840. The title reads "Decomposition of an alkali with a Volta column."

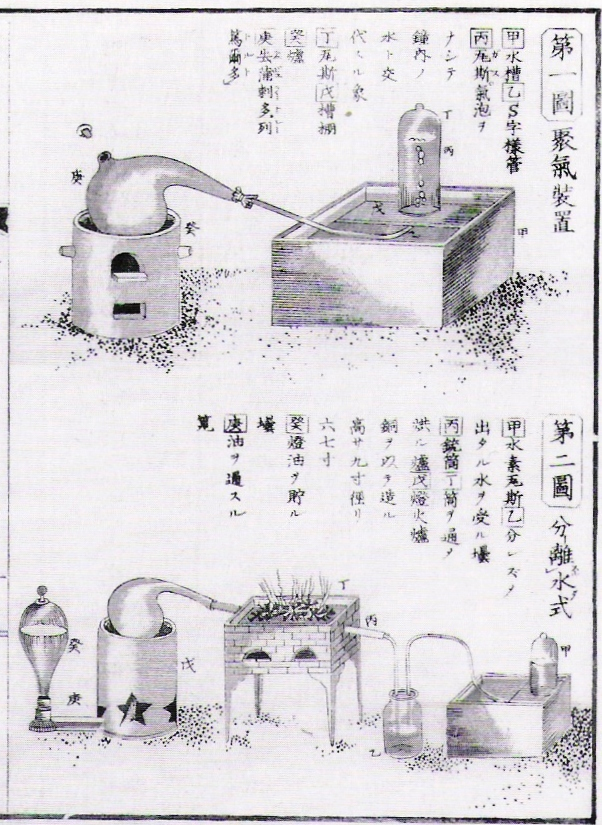
Antoine Lavoisier's chemical experiments with oxygen in Udagawa's 1840 Seimi Kaisō

In 1840, Udagawa Yōan published his Opening Principles of Chemistry (舎密開宗, Seimi Kaisō), a compilation of scientific books in Dutch, which describes a wide range of scientific knowledge from the West. Most of the Dutch original material appears to be derived from William Henry’s 1799 Elements of Experimental Chemistry. In particular, the book contains a detailed description of the electric battery invented by Volta forty years earlier in 1800. The battery itself was constructed by Udagawa in 1831 and used in experiments, including medical ones, based on a belief that electricity could help cure illnesses.

Udagawa's work reports for the first time in details the findings and theories of Lavoisier in Japan. Accordingly, Udagawa made scientific experiments and created new scientific terms, which are still in current use in modern scientific Japanese, like "oxidation" (酸化, sanka), "reduction" (還元, kangen), "saturation" (飽和, hōwa), and "element" (元素, genso).

=== Optical sciences ===
==== Telescopes ====
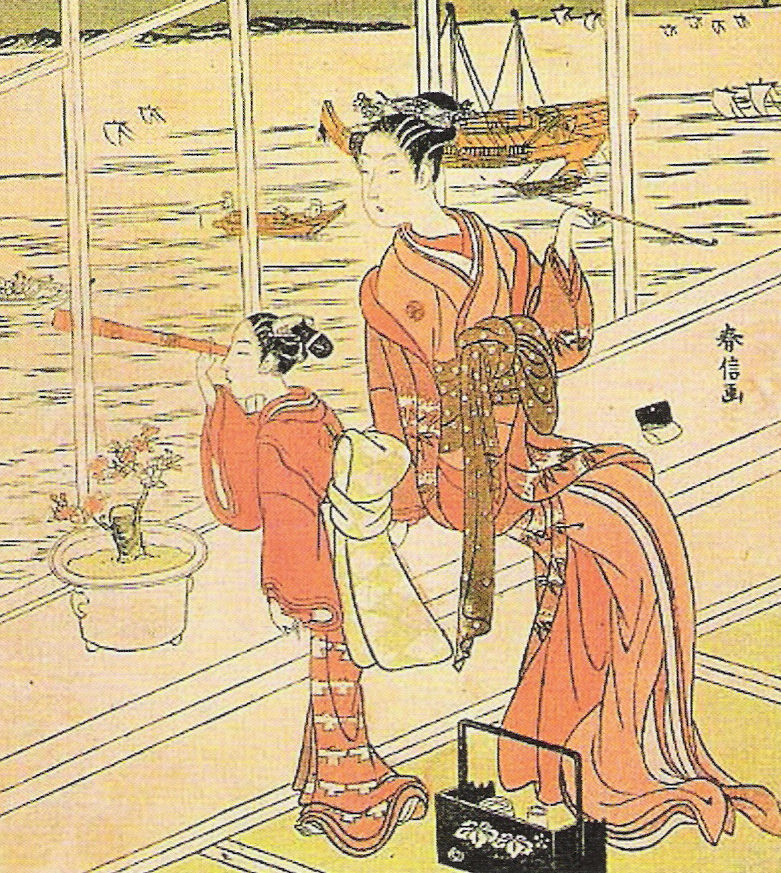
Edo women using a telescope. Early 19th century.

Japan's first telescope was offered by the English captain John Saris to Tokugawa Ieyasu in 1614, with the assistance of William Adams, during Saris's mission to open trade between England and Japan. This followed the invention of the telescope by Dutchman Hans Lippershey in 1608 by a mere six years. Refracting telescopes were widely used by the populace during the Edo period, both for pleasure and for the observation of the stars.

After 1640, the Dutch continued to inform the Japanese about the evolution of telescope technology. Until 1676 more than 150 telescopes were brought to Nagasaki. In 1831, after having spent several months in Edo where he could get accustomed with Dutch wares, Kunitomo Ikkansai (a former gun manufacturer) built Japan's first reflecting telescope of the Gregorian type. Kunitomo's telescope had a magnification of 60, and allowed him to make very detailed studies of sun spots and lunar topography. Four of his telescopes remain to this day.

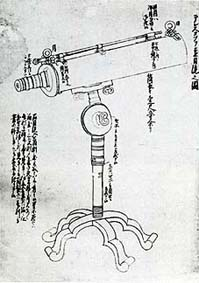
Kunitomo's reflecting telescope, 1831

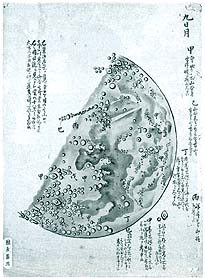
Observation of the moon by Kunitomo in 1836

==== Microscopes ====
Microscopes were invented in the Netherlands during the 17th century, but it is unclear when exactly they reached Japan. Clear descriptions of microscopes are made in the 1720 Nagasaki Night Stories Written (長崎夜話草, Nagasaki Yawasō) and in the 1787 book Saying of the Dutch. Although Europeans mainly used microscopes to observe small cellular organisms, the Japanese mainly used them for entomological purposes, creating detailed descriptions of insects.

==== Magic lanterns ====
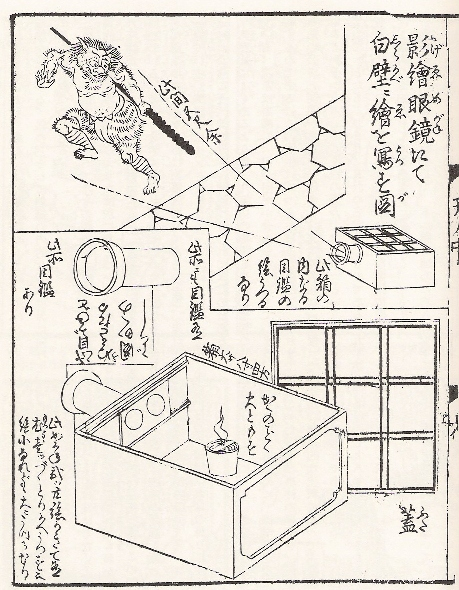
Mechanism of a magic lantern, from Tengu-tsū, 1779

Magic lanterns, first described in the West by Athanasius Kircher in 1671, became very popular attractions in multiple forms in 18th-century Japan.

The mechanism of a magic lantern, called "shadow picture glasses" (影絵眼鏡, Kagee Gankyō) was described using technical drawings in the book titled Tengu-tsū (天狗通) in 1779.

=== Mechanical sciences ===
==== Automata ====
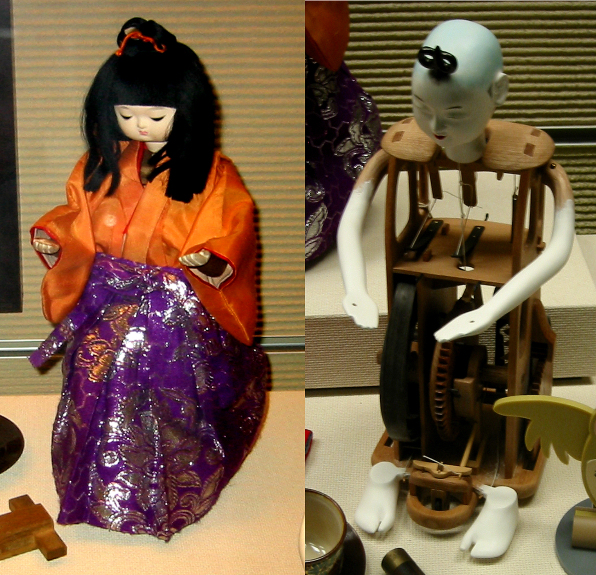
Tea-serving karakuri, with mechanism, 19th century. National Museum of Nature and Science, Tokyo.

Karakuri are mechanized puppets or automata from Japan from the 18th century to 19th century. The word means "device" and carries the connotations of mechanical devices as well as deceptive ones. Japan adapted and transformed the Western automata, which were fascinating the likes of Descartes, giving him the incentive for his mechanist theories of organisms, and Frederick the Great, who loved playing with automatons and miniature wargames.

Many were developed, mostly for entertainment purposes, ranging from tea-serving to arrow-shooting mechanisms. These ingenious mechanical toys were to become prototypes for the engines of the industrial revolution. They were powered by spring mechanisms similar to those of clocks.

==== Clocks ====
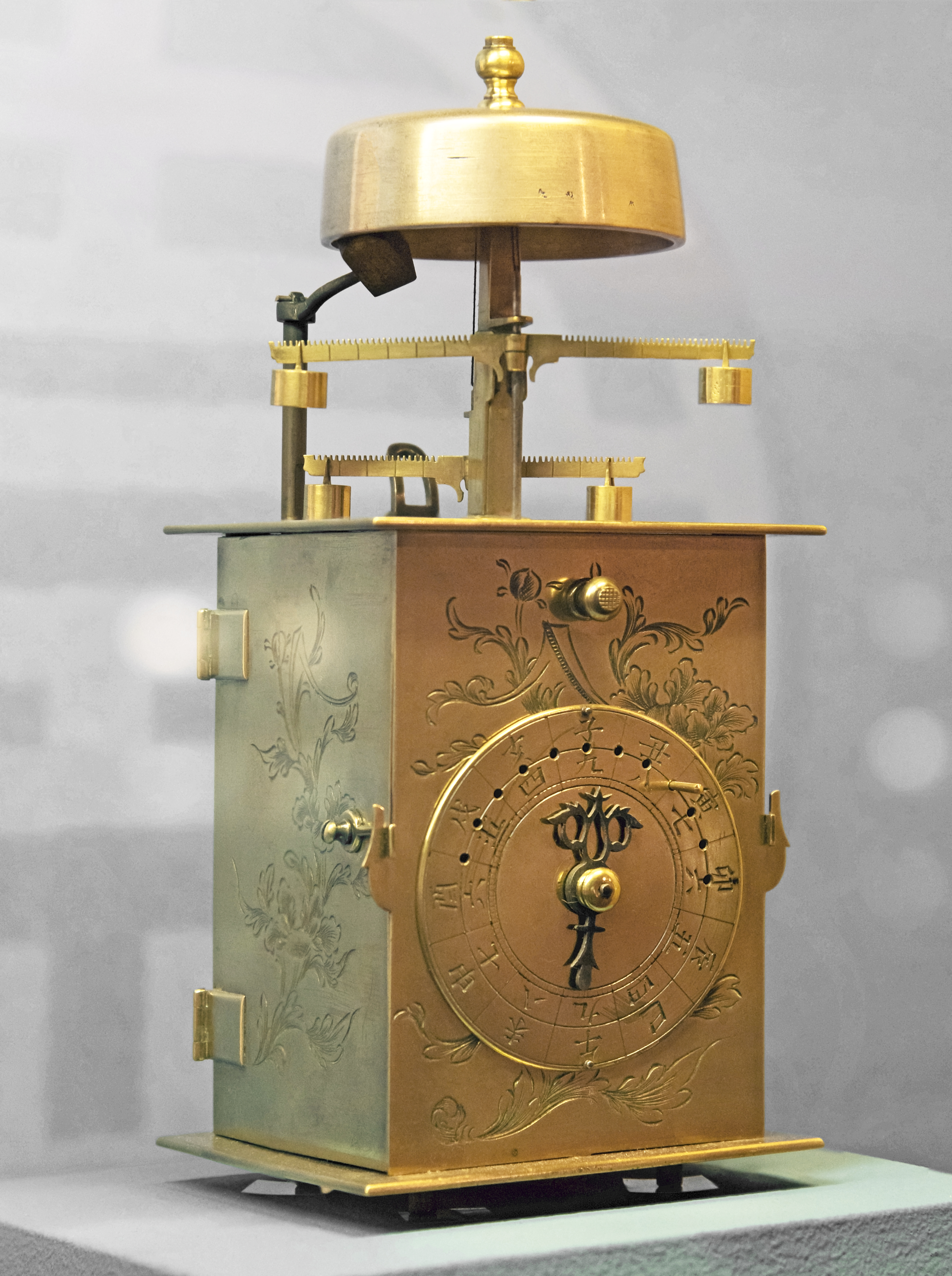
An 18th-century wadokei (Japanese clock)

Mechanical clocks were introduced into Japan by Jesuit missionaries or Dutch merchants in the sixteenth century. These clocks were of the lantern clock design, typically made of brass or iron, and used the relatively primitive verge and foliot escapement. These led to the development of an original Japanese clock, called Wadokei.

Neither the pendulum nor the balance spring were in use among European clocks of the period, and as such they were not included among the technologies available to the Japanese clockmakers at the start of the isolationist period in Japanese history, which began in 1641. As the length of an hour changed during winter, Japanese clock makers had to combine two clockworks in one clock. While drawing from European technology they managed to develop more sophisticated clocks, leading to spectacular developments such as the Universal Myriad year clock designed in 1850 by the inventor Tanaka Hisashige, the founder of what would become the Toshiba corporation.

==== Pumps ====
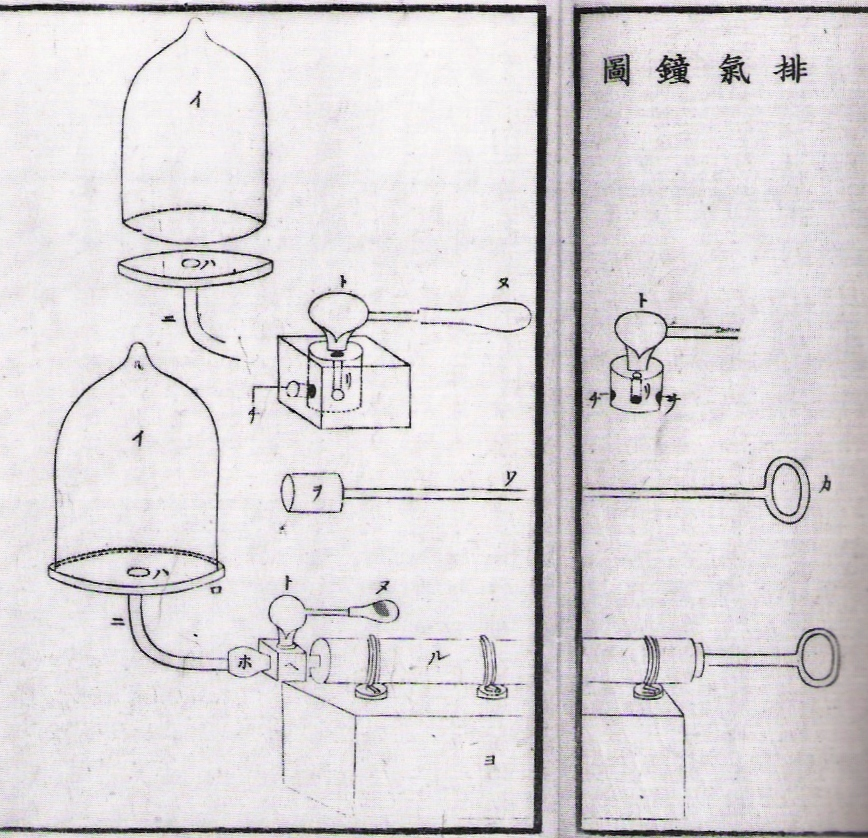
Vacuum pump drawing by Udagawa, 1834

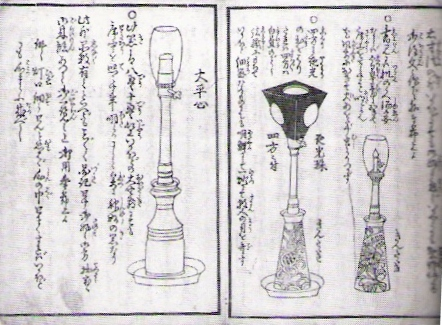
Description of perpetual lamps (無尽灯) using compressed air fuelling mechanisms

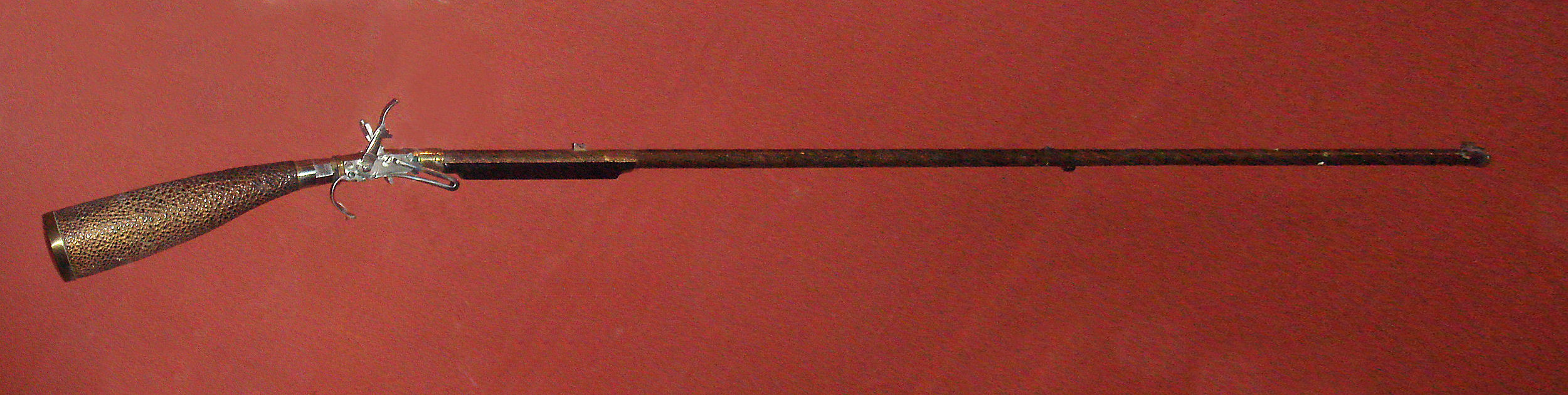
Air gun developed by Kunitomo, circa 1820–1830

Air pump mechanisms became popular in Europe from around 1660 following the experiments of Boyle. In Japan, the first description of a vacuum pump appear in Aochi Rinsō (ja:青地林宗)’s 1825 Atmospheric Observations (気海観瀾, Kikai Kanran), and slightly later pressure pumps and void pumps appear in Udagawa Shinsai (宇田川榛斎(玄真))’s 1834 Appendix of Far-Western Medical and Notable Things and Thoughts (遠西医方名物考補遺, Ensei Ihō Meibutsu Kō Hoi). These mechanisms were used to demonstrate the necessity of air for animal life and combustion, typically by putting a lamp or a small dog in a vacuum, and were used to make calculations of pressure and air density.

Many practical applications were found as well, such as in the manufacture of air guns by Kunitomo Ikkansai, after he repaired and analyzed the mechanism of some Dutch air guns which had been offered to the shōgun in Edo. A vast industry of perpetual oil lamps (無尽灯, Mujintō) developed, also derived by Kunitomo from the mechanism of air guns, in which oil was continuously supplied through a compressed air mechanism. Kunitomo developed agricultural applications of these technologies, such as a giant pump powered by an ox, to lift irrigation water.

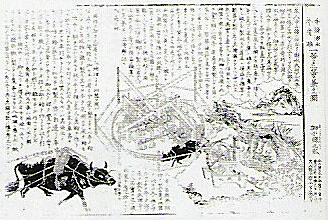
Kunitomo's "Aspiration pump driven by an ox" (1810 advertisement)

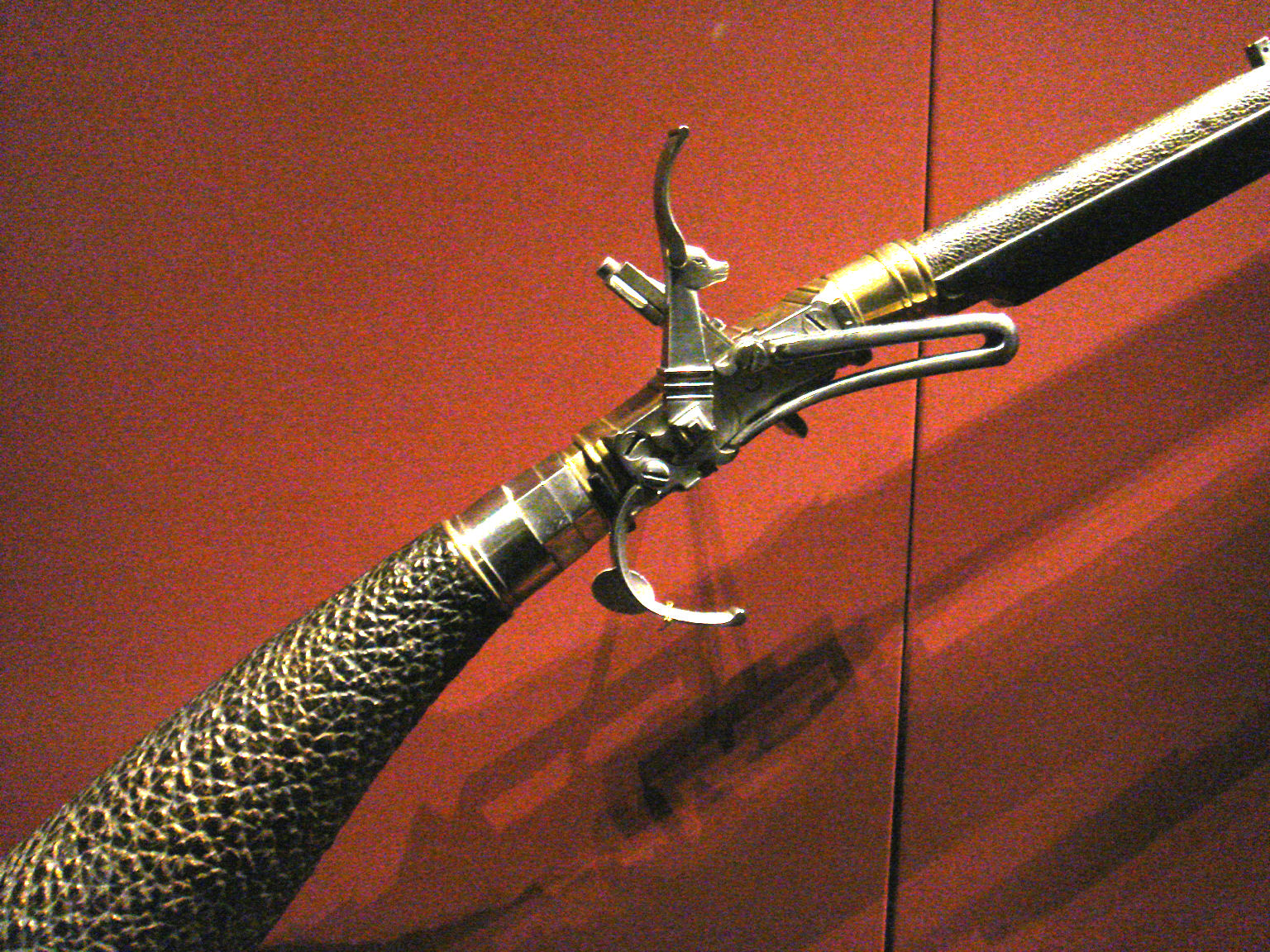
Air gun trigger mechanism

==== Aerial knowledge and experiments ====
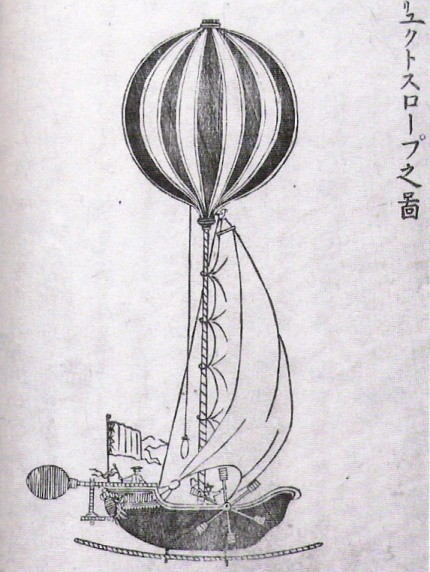
Drawing of a Western hot air balloon, from the 1787 Sayings of the Dutch

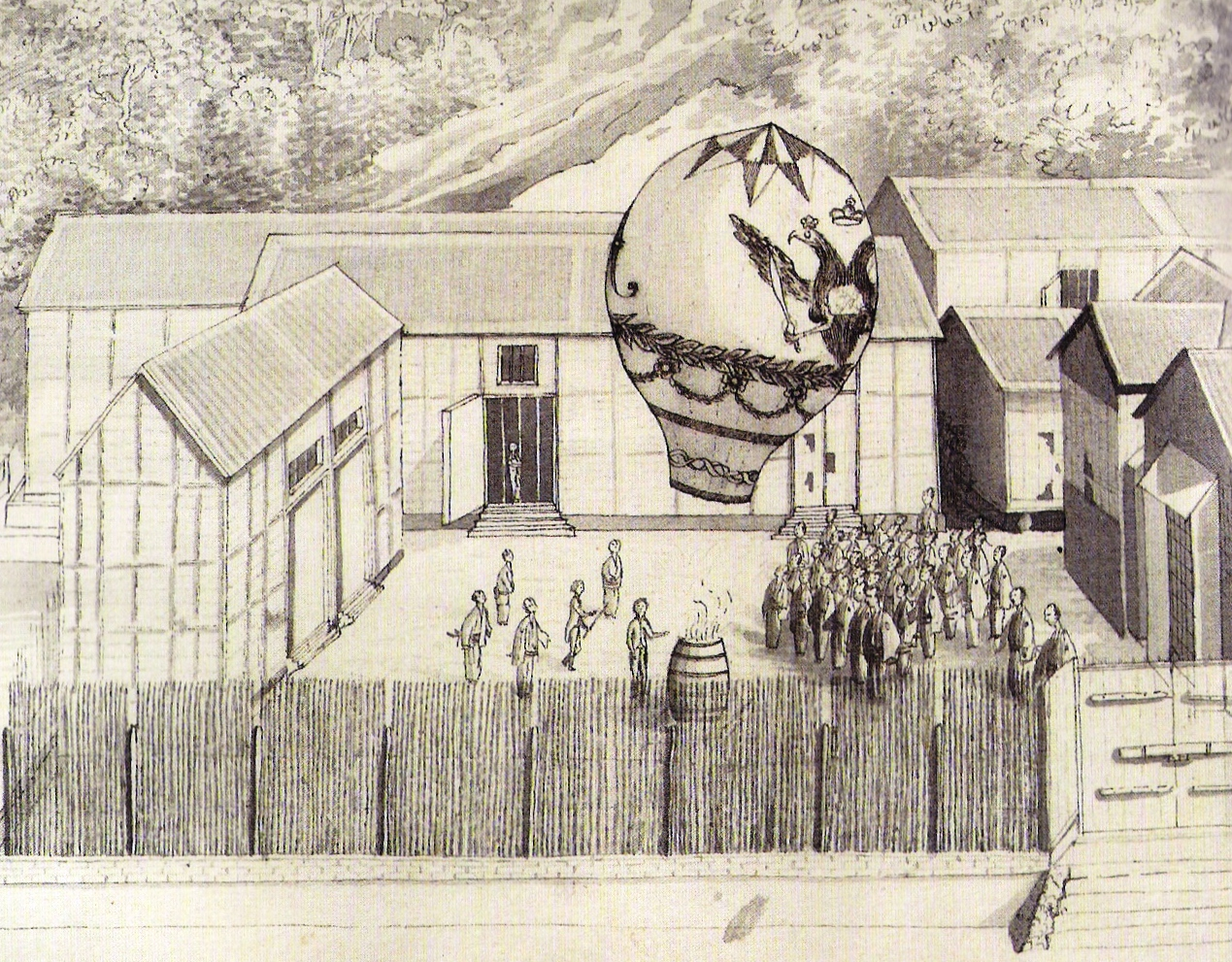
First demonstration of a hot air balloon in Umegasaki, Japan, in 1805 by Johann Caspar Horner

The first flight of a hot air balloon by the brothers Montgolfier in France in 1783, was reported less than four years later by the Dutch in Dejima, and published in the 1787 Sayings of the Dutch.

In 1805, almost twenty years later, the Swiss Johann Caspar Horner and the Prussian Georg Heinrich von Langsdorff, two scientists of the Kruzenshtern mission that also brought the Russian ambassador Nikolai Rezanov to Japan, made a hot air balloon out of Japanese paper (washi) and made a demonstration of the new technology in front of about 30 Japanese delegates.

Hot air balloons would mainly remain curiosities, becoming the object of experiments and popular depictions, until the development of military usages during the early Meiji period.

==== Steam engines ====
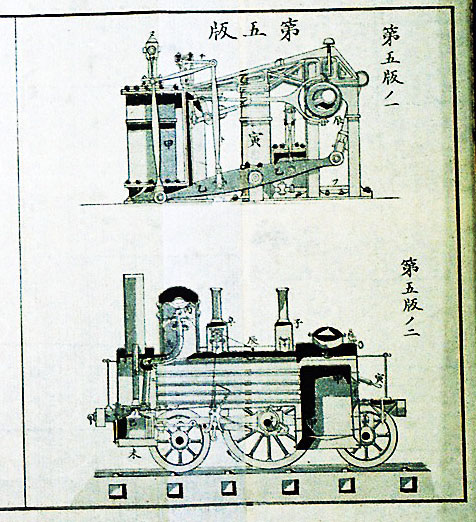
Drawing from the Japanese book Odd Devices of the Far West, completed in 1845 but published in 1854

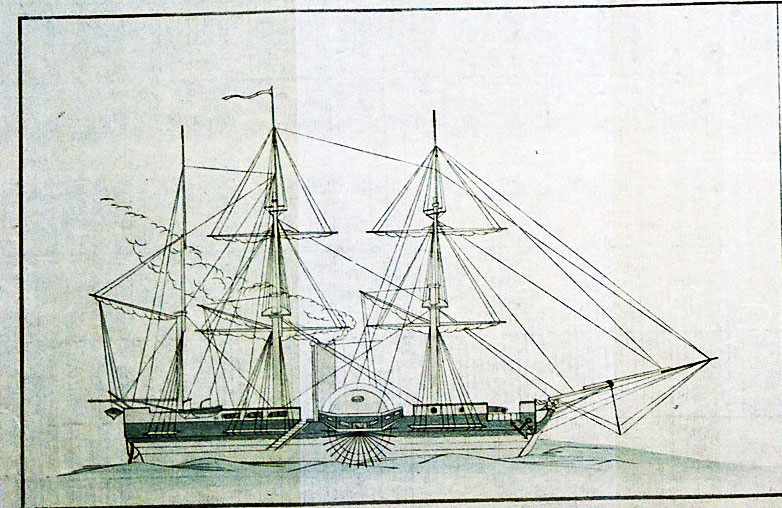
A steamship described in Odd Devices of the Far West

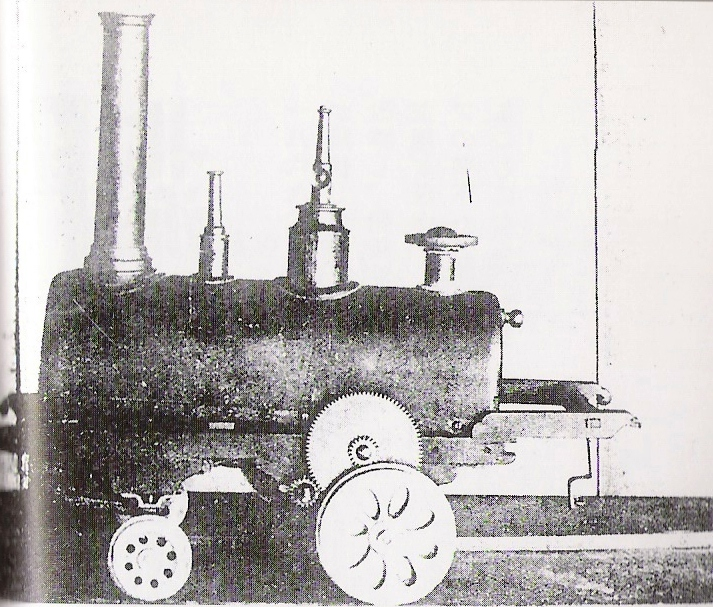
Japan's first steam engine, manufactured in 1853 by Tanaka Hisashige

Knowledge of the steam engine started to spread in Japan during the first half of the 19th century, although the first recorded attempts at manufacturing one date to the efforts of Tanaka Hisashige in 1853, following the demonstration of a steam engine by the Russian embassy of Yevfimiy Putyatin after his arrival in Nagasaki on August 12, 1853.

The Rangaku scholar Kawamoto Kōmin completed a book named Odd Devices of the Far West (遠西奇器述, Ensei Kiki-Jutsu) in 1845, which was finally published in 1854 as the need to spread Western knowledge became even more obvious with Commodore Perry’s opening of Japan and the subsequent increased contact with industrial Western nations. The book contains detailed descriptions of steam engines and steamships. Kawamoto had apparently postponed the book's publication due to the Bakufu's prohibition against the building of large ships.

=== Geography ===
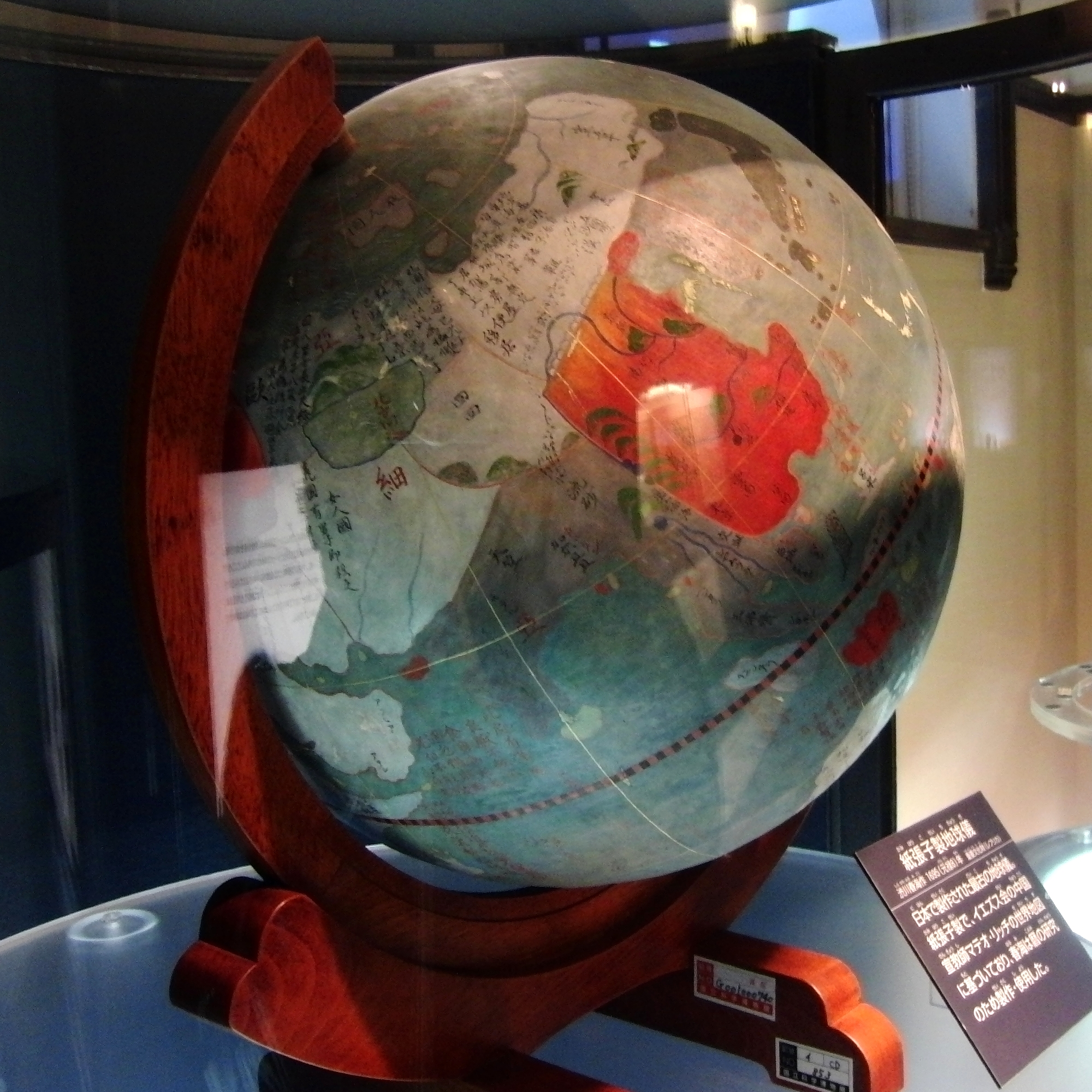
Papier-mâché globe created by Shibukawa Shunkai in 1695. One of the Important Cultural Properties of Japan. Exhibit in the National Museum of Nature and Science, Tokyo

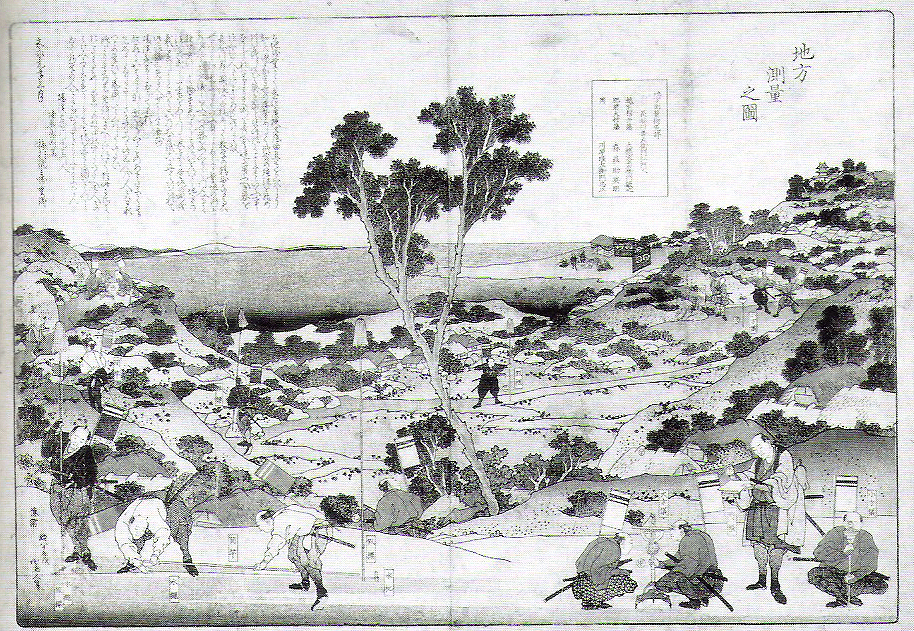
Topographical work via European methods, 1848 print from Regional Survey Maps (地方測量之図, Jikata Sokuryō no Zu)

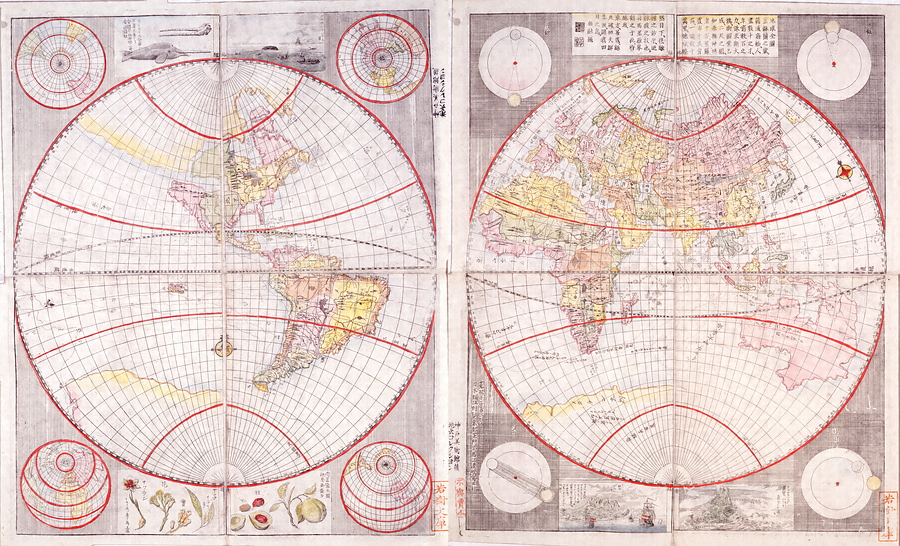
Japanese world map published in 1792, by Shiba Kōkan, "Complete Map of the Earth" (地球全図, Chikyū Zenzu)

Modern geographical knowledge of the world was transmitted to Japan during the 17th century through Chinese prints of Matteo Ricci's maps as well as globes brought to Edo by chiefs of the VOC trading post Dejima. This knowledge was regularly updated through information received from the Dutch, so that Japan had an understanding of the geographical world roughly equivalent to that of contemporary Western countries. With this knowledge, Shibukawa Shunkai made the first Japanese globe in 1690.

Throughout the 18th and 19th centuries, considerable efforts were made at surveying and mapping the country, usually with Western techniques and tools. The most famous maps using modern surveying techniques were made by Inō Tadataka between 1800 and 1818 and used as definitive maps of Japan for nearly a century. They do not significantly differ in accuracy with modern ones, just like contemporary maps of European lands.

=== Biology ===
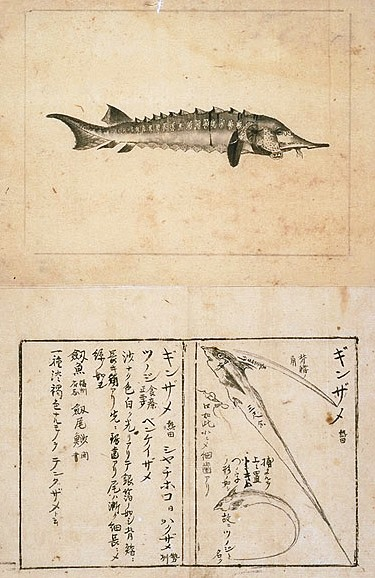
Animal plate by Itō Keisuke

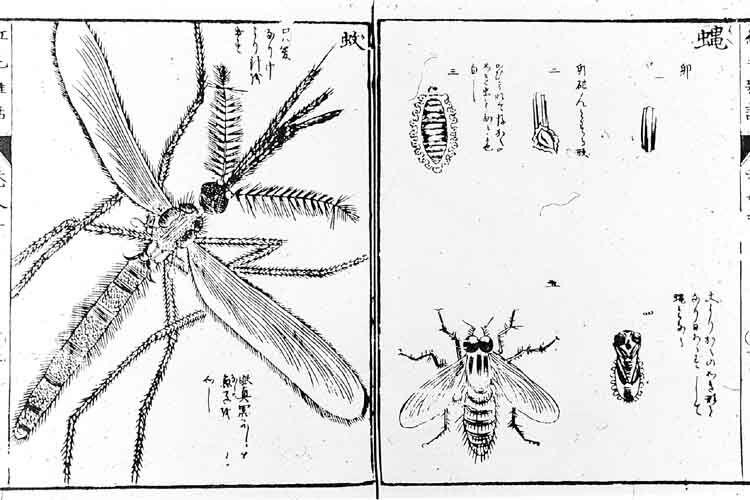
Description of insects in the Sayings of the Dutch, 1787

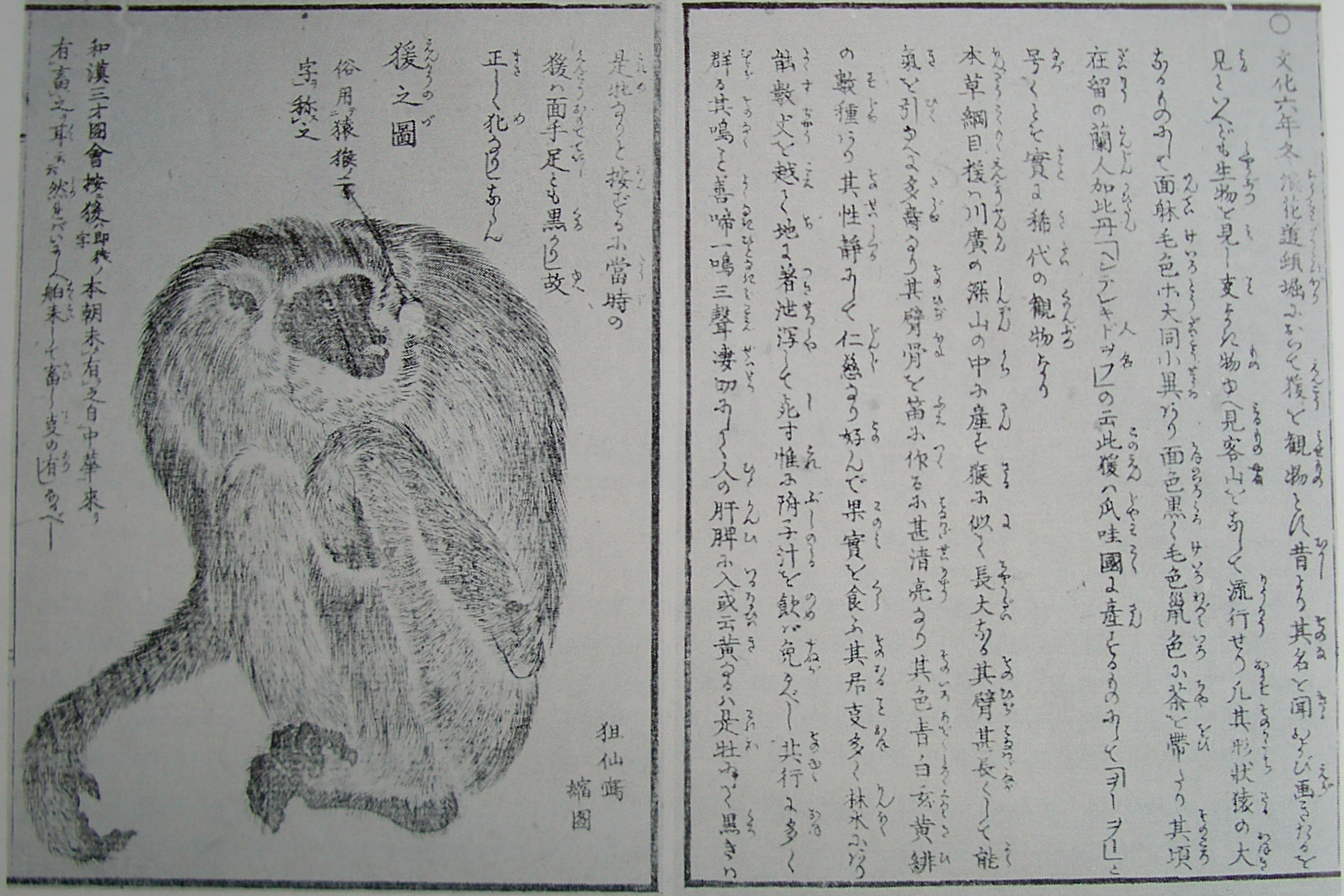
The first gibbon brought to Japan in modern times (1809), drawn by Mori Sosen

The description of the natural world made considerable progress through Rangaku; this was influenced by the Encyclopedists and promoted by von Siebold (a German doctor in the service of the Dutch at Dejima). Itō Keisuke created books describing animal species of the Japanese islands, with drawings of a near-photographic quality.

Entomology was extremely popular, and details about insects, often obtained through the use of microscopes (see above), were widely publicized.

In a rather rare case of "reverse Rangaku" (that is, the science of isolationist Japan making its way to the West), an 1803 treatise on the raising of silk worms and manufacture of silk, the Secret Notes on Sericulture (養蚕秘録, Yōsan Hiroku) was brought to Europe by von Siebold and translated into French and Italian in 1848, contributing to the development of the silk industry in Europe.

Plants were requested by the Japanese and delivered from the 1640s on, including flowers such as precious tulips and useful items such as the cabbage and the tomato.

=== Other publications ===
- Automatons: Karakuri Instructional Pattern Notes (機訓蒙鑑草, Karakuri Kinmō Kagami-Gusa), 1730.
- Mathematics: Western-Style Calculation Text (西洋算書, Seiyō Sansho).
- Optics: Telescope Production (遠鏡製造, Enkyō Seizō).
- Glass-making: Glass Production (硝子製造, Garasu Seizō).
- Military: Tactics of the Three Combat Arms (三兵答古知幾, Sanpei Takuchiiki), by Takano Chōei concerning the tactics of the Prussian Army, 1850.
- Description of the method of amalgam for gold plating in Sōken Kishō (装劍奇賞), or 装剣奇賞 in Shinjitai, by Inaba Shin'emon (稲葉新右衛門), 1781.

== Aftermath ==
=== Commodore Perry ===
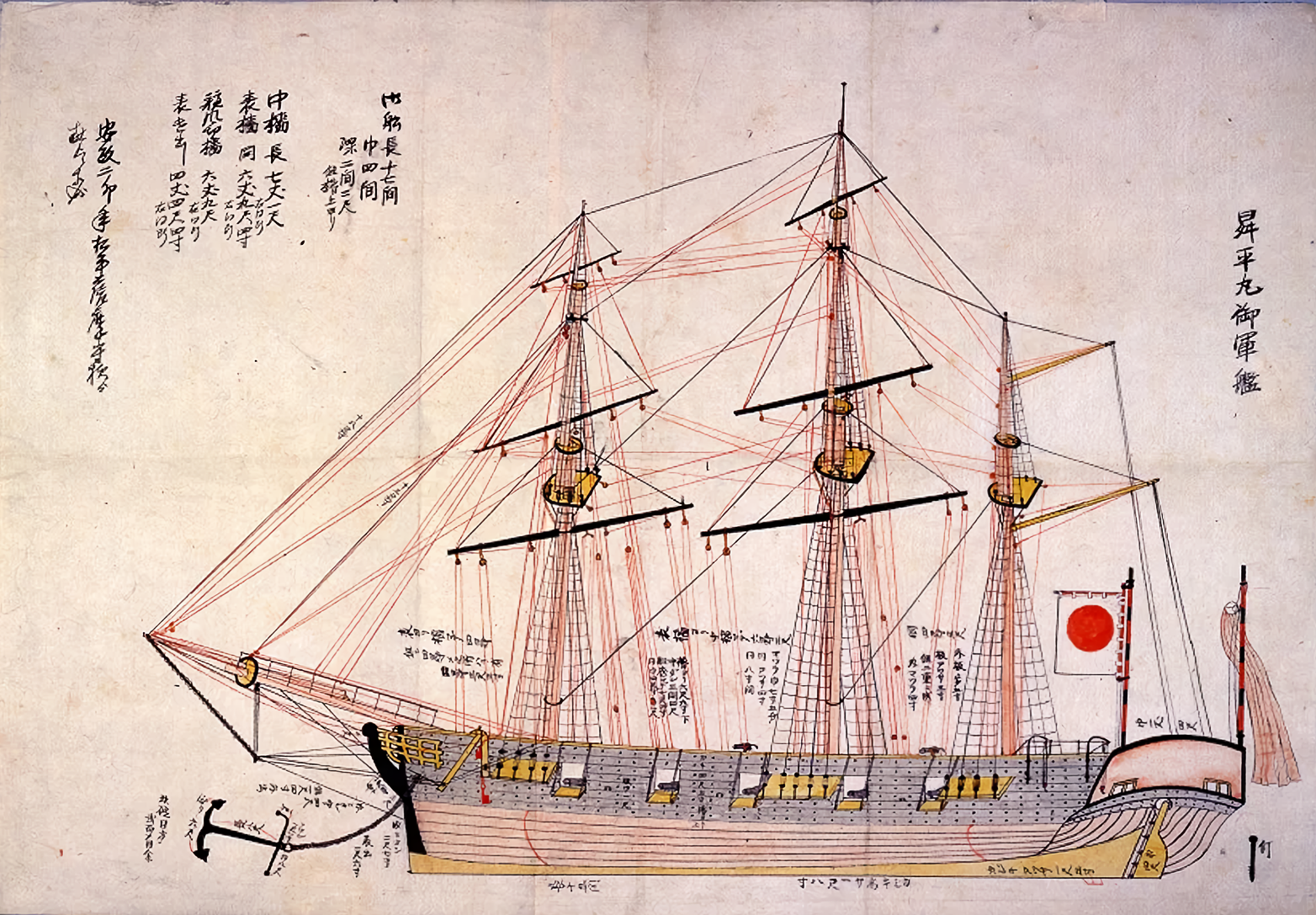
The 1854 Shōhei Maru was built from Dutch technical drawings.

When Commodore Perry obtained the signature of treaties at the Convention of Kanagawa in 1854, he brought technological gifts to the Japanese representatives. Among them was a small telegraph and a small steam train complete with tracks. These were promptly studied by the Japanese as well.

Essentially considering the arrival of Western ships as a threat and a factor for destabilization, the Bakufu ordered several of its fiefs to build warships along Western designs. These ships, such as the Hōō-Maru, the Shōhei-Maru, and the Asahi-Maru, were designed and built, mainly based on Dutch books and plans. Some were built within a mere year or two of Perry's visit. Similarly, steam engines were immediately studied. Tanaka Hisashige, who had made the Myriad year clock, created Japan's first steam engine, based on Dutch drawings and the observation of a Russian steam ship in Nagasaki in 1853. These developments led to the Satsuma fief building Japan's first steam ship, the Unkō-Maru (雲行丸), in 1855, barely two years after Japan's first encounter with such ships in 1853 during Perry's visit.

In 1858, the Dutch officer Kattendijke commented:

There are some imperfections in the details, but I take my hat off to the genius of the people who were able to build these without seeing an actual machine, but only relied on simple drawings.

=== Last phase of "Dutch" learning ===
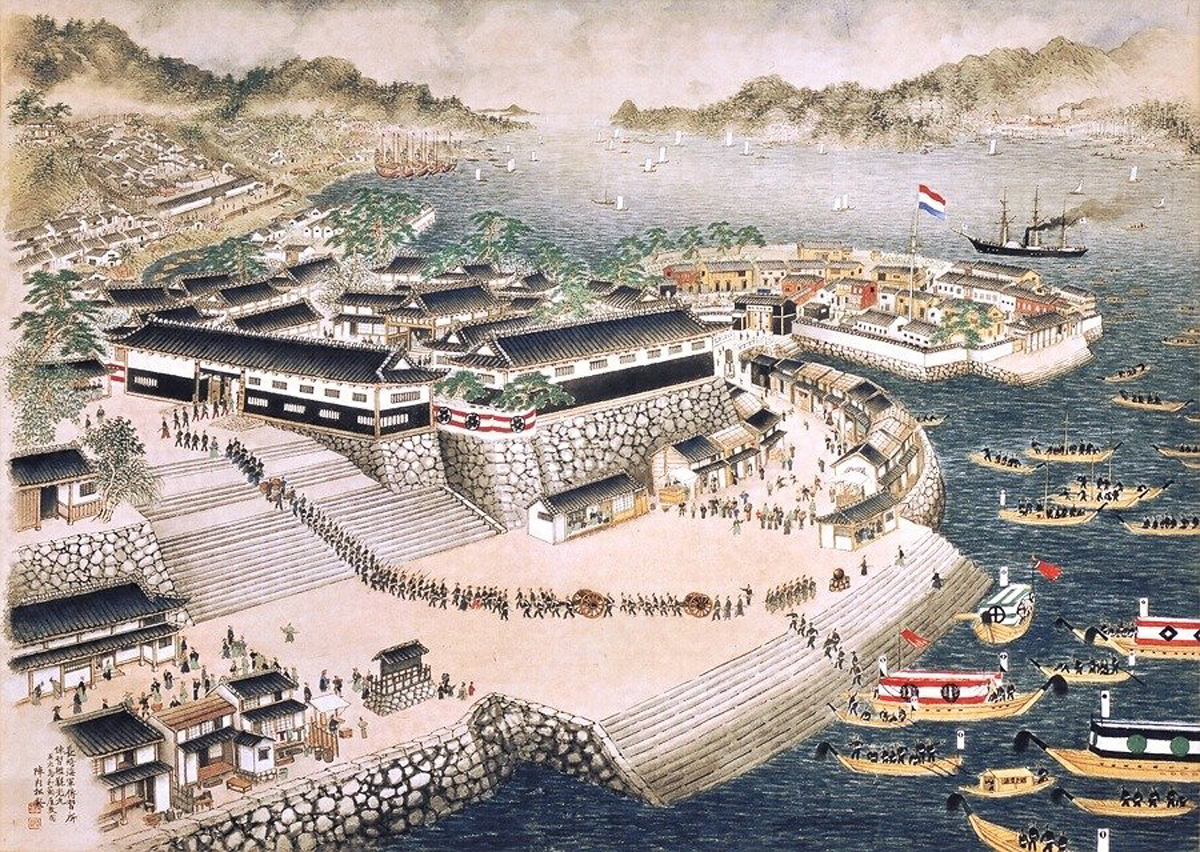
The Nagasaki Naval Training Center, in Nagasaki, next to Dejima

Following Commodore Perry's visit, the Netherlands continued to have a key role in transmitting Western know-how to Japan for some time. The Bakufu relied heavily on Dutch expertise to learn about modern Western shipping methods. Thus, the Nagasaki Naval Training Center was established in 1855 right at the entrance of the Dutch trading post of Dejima, allowing for maximum interaction with Dutch naval knowledge. From 1855 to 1859, education was directed by Dutch naval officers, before the transfer of the school to Tsukiji in Tokyo, where English educators became prominent.

The center was equipped with Japan's first steam warship, the Kankō Maru, given by the government of the Netherlands the same year, which may be one of the last great contributions of the Dutch to Japanese modernization, before Japan opened itself to multiple foreign influences. The future Admiral Enomoto Takeaki was one of the students of the Training Center. He was also sent to the Netherlands for five years (1862–1867), with several other students, to develop his knowledge of naval warfare, before coming back to become the admiral of the shōgun's fleet.

=== Enduring influence of Rangaku ===
Scholars of Rangaku continued to play a key role in the modernization of Japan. Scholars such as Fukuzawa Yukichi, Ōtori Keisuke, Yoshida Shōin, Katsu Kaishū, and Sakamoto Ryōma built on the knowledge acquired during Japan's isolation and then progressively shifted the main language of learning from Dutch to English.

As these Rangaku scholars usually took a pro-Western stance, which was in line with the policy of the Shogunate (Bakufu) but against anti-foreign imperialistic movements, several were assassinated, such as Sakuma Shōzan in 1864 and Sakamoto Ryōma in 1867.

== Notable scholars ==
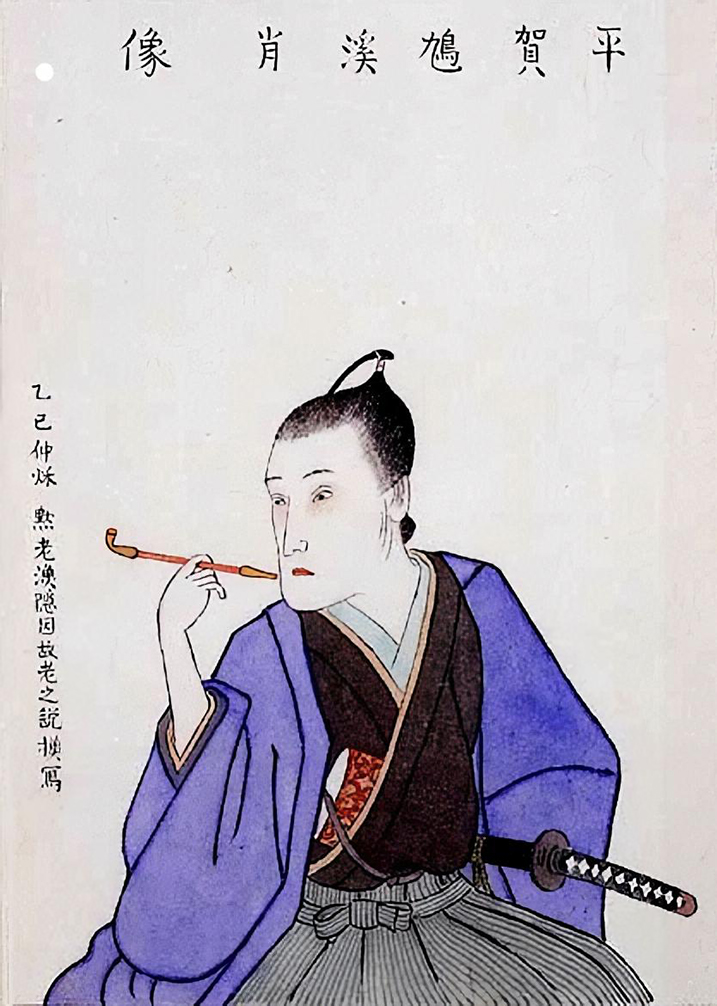
Hiraga Gennai (平賀源内, 1729–79)

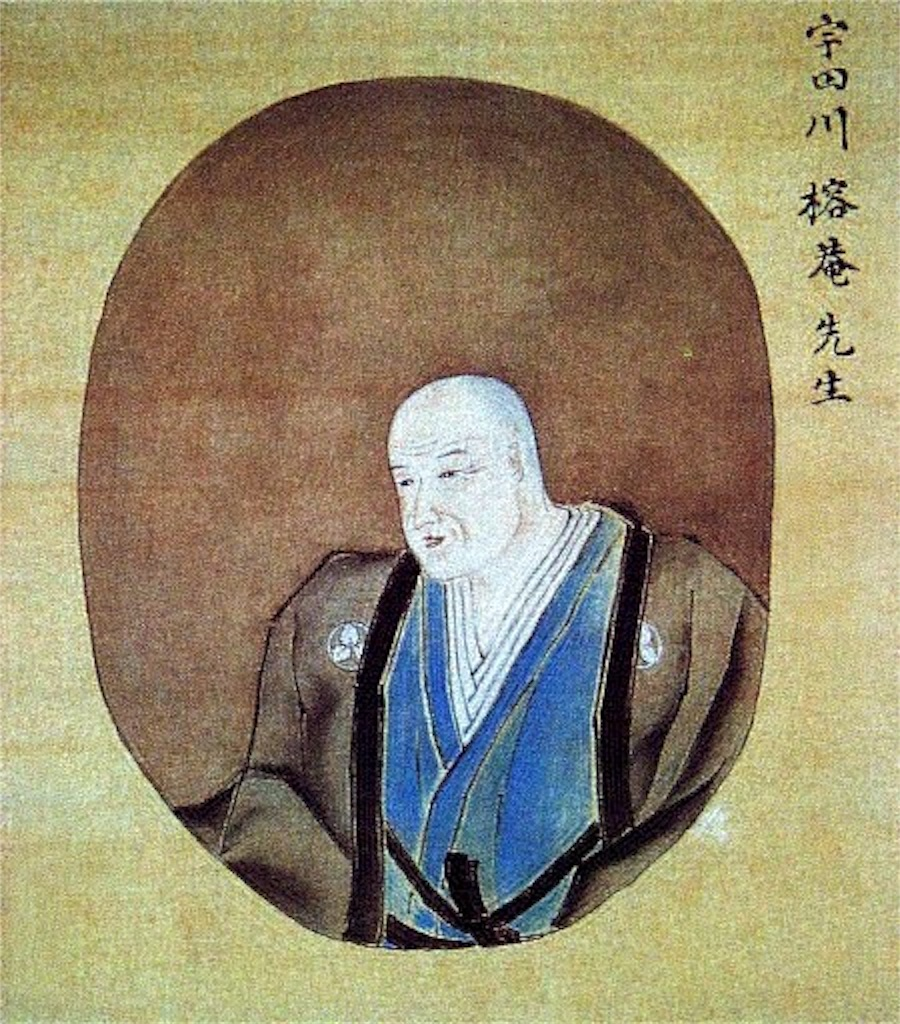
Udagawa Yōan (宇田川榕菴, 1798–1846)

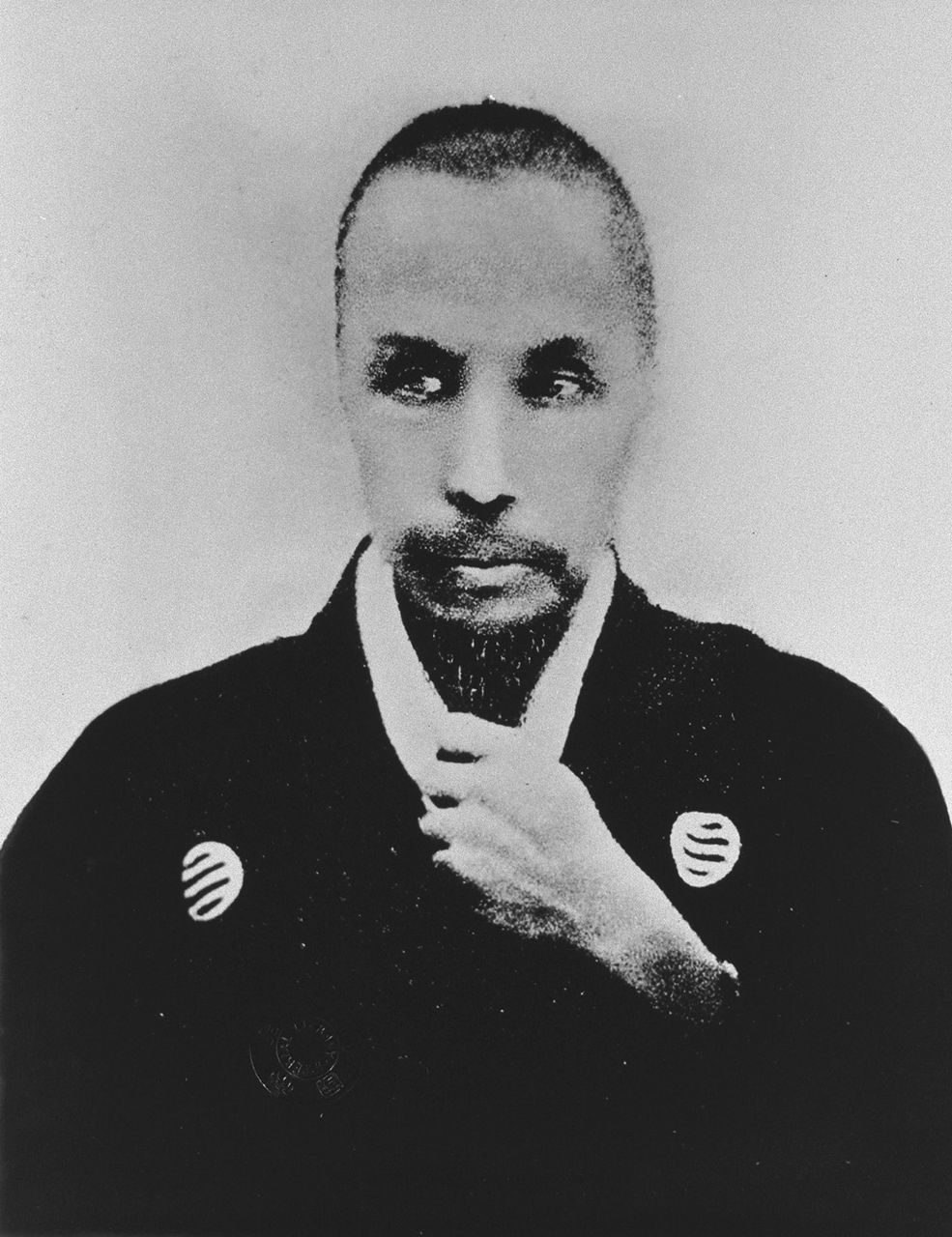
Sakuma Shōzan (佐久間象山, 1811–64)

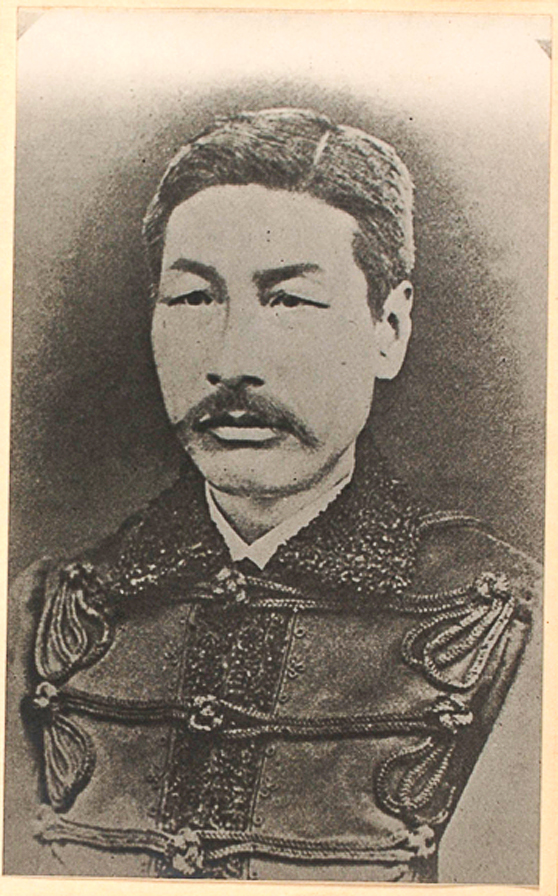
Takeda Ayasaburō (武田斐三郎, 1827–80)

- Arai Hakuseki (新井 白石, 1657–1725), author of Sairan Igen and Seiyō Kibun
- Aoki Kon'yō (青木 昆陽, 1698–1769)
- Maeno Ryōtaku (前野 良沢, 1723–1803)
- Yoshio Kōgyū (吉雄 耕牛, 1724–1800)
- Ono Ranzan (小野 蘭山, 1729–1810), author of Botanical Classification (本草綱目啓蒙, Honzō Kōmoku Keimō).
- Hiraga Gennai (平賀 源内, 1729–79) proponent of the "Elekiter"
- Gotō Gonzan (後藤 艮山)
- Kagawa Shūan (香川 修庵)
- Sugita Genpaku (杉田 玄白, 1733–1817) author of New Treatise on Anatomy (解体新書, Kaitai Shinsho).
- Asada Gōryū (麻田 剛立, 1734–99)
- Motoki Ryōei (本木 良永, 1735–94), author of Usage of Planetary and Heavenly Spheres (天地二球用法, Tenchi Nikyū Yōhō)
- Shiba Kōkan (司馬江漢, 1747–1818), painter.
- Shizuki Tadao (志筑 忠雄, 1760–1806), author of New Book on Calendar Phenomena (暦象新書, Rekishō Shinsho), 1798 and translator of Engelbert Kaempfer's Sakokuron.
- Hanaoka Seishū (華岡 青洲, 1760–1835), first physician who performed surgery using general anaesthesia.
- Takahashi Yoshitoki (高橋 至時, 1764–1804)
- Motoki Shōei (本木 正栄, 1767–1822)
- Udagawa Genshin (宇田川 玄真, 1769–1834), author of New Volume on Public Welfare (厚生新編, Kōsei Shinpen).
- Aoji Rinsō (青地 林宗, 1775–1833), author of Study of the Atmosphere (気海観瀾, Kikai Kanran), 1825.
- Hoashi Banri (帆足 万里, 1778–1852), author of Physical Sciences (究理通, Kyūri Tsū).
- Takahashi Kageyasu (高橋 景保, 1785–1829)
- Matsuoka Joan (松岡 恕庵)
- Udagawa Yōan (宇田川 榕菴, 1798–1846), author of Botanica Sutra (菩多尼訶経, Botanika Kyō; using the Latin "botanica" in ateji) and Chemical Sciences (舎密開宗, Seimi Kaisō)
- Itō Keisuke (伊藤 圭介, 1803–1901), author of Western Plant Taxonomy (泰西本草名疏, Taisei Honzō Meiso)
- Takano Chōei (高野 長英, 1804–50), physician, dissident, co-translator of a book on the tactics of the Prussian Army, Tactics of the Three Combat Arms (三兵答古知幾, Sanpei Takuchiiki), 1850.
- Ōshima Takatō (大島 高任, 1810–71), engineer — established the first western style blast furnace and made the first Western-style cannon in Japan.
- Kawamoto Kōmin (川本 幸民, 1810–71), author of Strange Machines of the Far West (遠西奇器述, Ensei Kikijutsu), completed in 1845, published in 1854.
- Ogata Kōan (緒方 洪庵, 1810–63), founder of the Tekijuku, and author of Introduction to Pathology (病学通論, Byōgaku Tsūron), Japan's first treatise on the subject.
- Sakuma Shōzan (佐久間 象山, 1811–64)
- Hashimoto Sōkichi (橋本 宗吉)
- Hazama Shigetomi (間 重富)
- Hirose Genkyō (広瀬 元恭), author of Science Compendium (理学提要, Rigaku Teiyō).
- Takeda Ayasaburō (武田 斐三郎, 1827–80), architect of the fortress of Goryōkaku
- Ōkuma Shigenobu (大隈 重信, 1838–1922)
- Yoshio Kōgyū (吉雄 耕牛, 1724–1800), translator, collector and scholar

== See also ==
- Dutch missions to Edo
- Glossary of Japanese words of Dutch origin
- Japan–Netherlands relations
- Keio University
- Meiji Restoration
- Nakatsu Castle
- Uki-e
