= Johann Horner =

Johann or Johan Horner may refer to:

- Johan Hörner (1711–1763), Swedish-born Danish painter
- Johann Caspar Horner (1774–1834), Swiss physicist and astronomer
- Johann Friedrich Horner (1831–1886), Swiss ophthalmologist
