= Kawamoto Kōmin =

Japanese Rangaku scholar and doctor

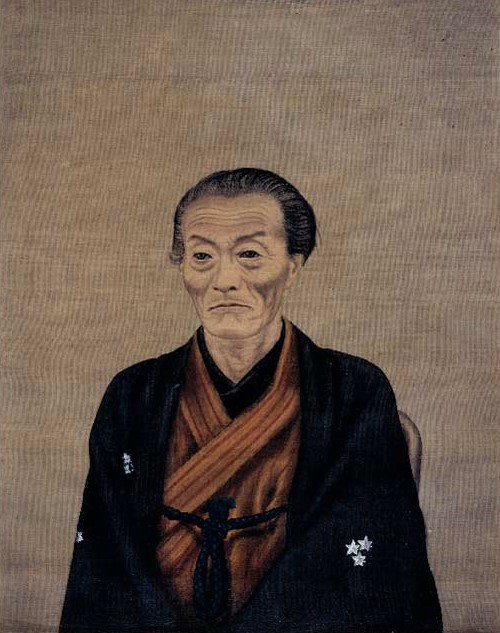
Kawamoto Kōmin

Kawamoto Kōmin (川本 幸民; 1810 – June 1, 1871) was a 19th-century Japanese scholar of Rangaku and doctor. His true name was Yutaka (裕), art name Yuken (裕軒). His father was Kawamoto Shuan (川本 周安), a clan doctor of Sanda Domain. Today he is known as a "father of chemistry in Japan" thanks to his works.

He published various publications on science and technology such as Kagaku Shinsho (化学新書). Based on his specialized knowledge, he test-manufactured sugar, (Note: He supervised test-manufacturing of sugar in Satsuma Domain, where he belonged at the time.) matches, and daguerreotype, which contributed to the development of technology in Japan. He is assumed to have brewed beer for the first time in Japan. (Note: The legend says that he brewed beer and held a sampling party in Asakusa after the Perry Expedition, but there are no extant records showing his brew. Some literature, however, refers clearly to his successful brewing of beer.) He is also noted as the first person to have used the Sino-Xenic term kagaku (化学) for chemistry now standard for Japanese and other influenced Eastern languages.

== Biography ==
Kawamoto Kōmin was born in Sanda Domain (now Sanda, Hyogo) in 1810.

He started his education at the school of Sanda Domain at the age of 10 (in East Asian age reckoning). In 1827, he studied kampo (traditional Chinese pharmacology) at Konashi (木梨) Village (now Kato, Hyogo) for about a year.

Two years later in 1829, Kuki Takakuni (九鬼隆国), the lord of Sanda Domain, was impressed by Kawamoto's talent and had him study Western medicine in Edo (now Tokyo). Studying under Adachi Choshun (足立長雋) and Tsuboi Nobumichi (坪井信道), Kawamoto was quite at home with physics and chemistry.

In 1833, he followed in his father's footsteps and was appointed to the position of clan doctor. That same year, he married Hideko (秀子), whose father was Aochi Rinso (青地林宗). In 1834, however, he was found guilty of having injured someone and was sentenced to house arrest for six years. After the house arrest, he was caught in a fire twice. This was a dark period in his life.

Despite this, he kept achieving great works in science and technology into the late 1840s. According to his essay Yuken Zuihitsu (裕軒随筆), he test-manufactured white phosphorus matches in 1848. He also issued many publications including translations, starting with Kikai Kanran Kogi (気海観瀾広義), which was published in 1851. Shimazu Nariakira (島津斉彬), the lord of Satsuma Domain, specifically chose Kawamoto to come to the Satsuma Domain to work as a technical adviser. In 1859, Kawamoto became a professor at Bansho Shirabesho (蕃書調所), the predecessor of the present University of Tokyo. Two years later in 1861, he published his famous Kagaku Shinsho (化学新書), which introduced modern chemistry from the West to a Japanese audience. This is considered one of the most important works on chemistry in the Edo period, as well as Seimi Kaiso (舎密開宗) written by Udagawa Yōan. Kawamoto's work was used as a textbook in Bansho Shirabesho.

In 1868, he went back to his hometown of Sanda and opened Eiran Juku (英蘭塾), a private school. The school soon became very popular and even a branch school was opened. Later, his son Kiyojiro (清二郎) was appointed to Dajō-kan, and he went up to Tokyo again accompanying his son. On June 1, 1871, he died in Tokyo at the age of 62.

== After his death ==
In 1953, a monument was built in front of Sanda Elementary School in Sanda City in honor of Kawamoto.

In 2010, to commemorate the 200th anniversary of Kawamoto's birth, Konishi Brewing Company brewed beer with the manufacturing process in those days, referring to his translation, Kagaku Shinsho (化学新書), and the product has been on sale.

Japan Academy possesses various related materials including Kagaku Shinsho, which were recognized as Chemical Heritage in Japan by Chemical Society of Japan in 2011.

== Major works ==
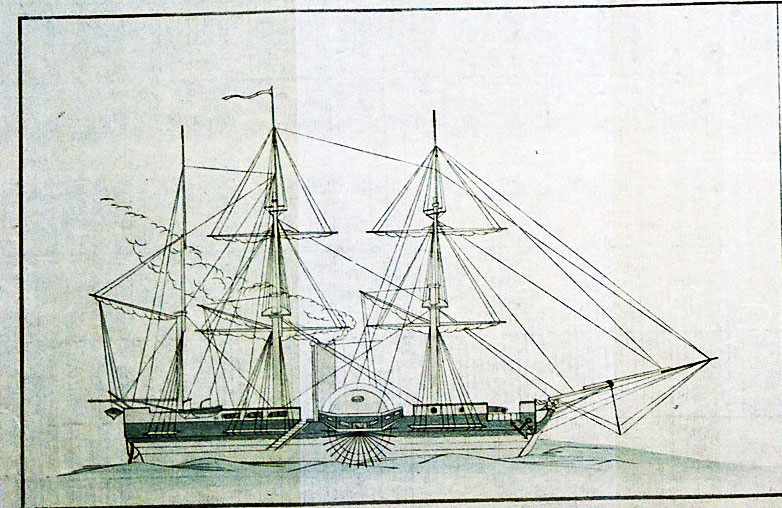
Drawing of steamship from Ensei Kiki Jutsu

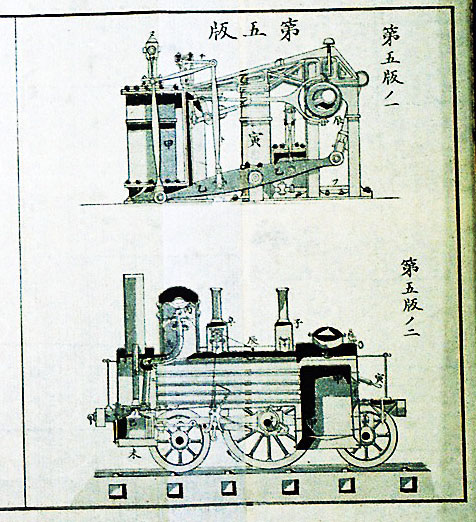
Drawing of steam engine and locomotive from Ensei Kiki Jutsu

=== Kikai Kanran Kogi ===
Kikai Kanran Kogi (気海観瀾広義) was first published in 1851. The book consists of five volumes. Kawamoto improved Kikai Kanran (気海観瀾), the first book on physics in Japan, originally written by Aochi Rinso (青地林宗), who was his father-in-law.

=== Ensei Kiki Jutsu ===
Ensei Kiki Jutsu (遠西奇器述) was published in 1854, a manual on many kinds of machinery and instruments such as steamship, daguerreotype, and telegraph.

=== Kagaku Shinsho ===
Kagaku Shinsho (化学新書) was published in 1861. He translated the Dutch translation of "Die Schule der Chemie" written by Julius Adolph Stöckhardt, a German scientist. In the book, he used the word Kagaku (化学) or chemistry for the first time instead of the word Seimi (舎密), which was more popular at the time. (Note: The word Kagaku was not a word of his coinage, but was borrowed from Chinese book. In fact Kōmin wrote a book named Banyū Kagaku (万有化学) in 1860, in which he adopted the word Kagaku for the first time. However Tokugawa shogunate prohibited the publication.)

Kagaku Shinsho consists of fifteen volumes and two sections: inorganic chemistry and organic chemistry. It was not printed, and its manuscripts were used as textbooks at Bansho Shirabesho, where Kōmin was working as a professor. In Meiji Era he integrated it with other books on chemistry and published Kagaku Tsū (化学通).

It is now considered to be one of the most prominent books on chemistry in late Edo period as well as Seimi Kaisō (舎密開宗) written by Udagawa Yōan. Compared to Seimi Kaisō the latest concepts at the time like atom, molecule, chemical compounds and chemical equation were explained in it.

The inorganic chemistry section contains detailed specifics on chemical elements and chemical compounds. It covers various elements and compounds of acids (e.g. sulfuric acid, hydrochloric acid), light metals (e.g. sodium, potassium) and heavy metals (e.g.manganese, cobalt, lead). Kōmin assigned kanji to each element as an element symbol e.g. "水", "炭", "窒" and "酸", which indicate hydrogen, carbon, nitrogen and oxygen for each. With this style of element symbol, for example, nitrogen dioxide (NO_{2}) was expressed like this: "窒酸_{二}", where "二" means two in Japanese. In the explanation of chemical compounds, the concept of formation of molecules with bonding was described with figures, in which John Dalton's atomic theory was first introduced to Japan.

In organic chemistry section, it was explained that plant component consists of four kinds of elements i.e. hydrogen, carbon, nitrogen and oxygen. The concept of isomers was explained with molecular formula. It also contains the latest knowledge at that time on organic chemistry e.g. protein, acetyl group, aldehyde and radical. In addition brewing of alcoholic drink was explained in detail. Kōmin is assumed to have brewed beer based on the knowledge gained through this.

== Sources ==
- Okuno, Hisateru (1980). 江戸の化学 (玉川選書) (in Japanese). Tamagawa University Press. ISBN 978-4472152115.
- Kita, Yasutoshi (2008). 蘭学者川本幸民 近代の扉を開いた万能科学者の生涯 (in Japanese). PHP Institute. ISBN 9784569699639.
