= Bansha no goku =

The Bansha no goku (蛮社の獄, literally "Indictment of the society for western (or barbarian) study") refers to the 1839 suppression of scholars of Western Studies (rangaku) by the Edo Shogunate government of Japan.

The incident was provoked by criticism of the isolationist sakoku policy due to actions such as the Morrison Incident when an unarmed American merchant ship was fired upon under the Edict to Repel Foreign Ships.

Among those who suffered from this action were Watanabe Kazan, Takano Chōei and Koseki Sanei.
