= Erekiteru =

Japanese name for a type of generator

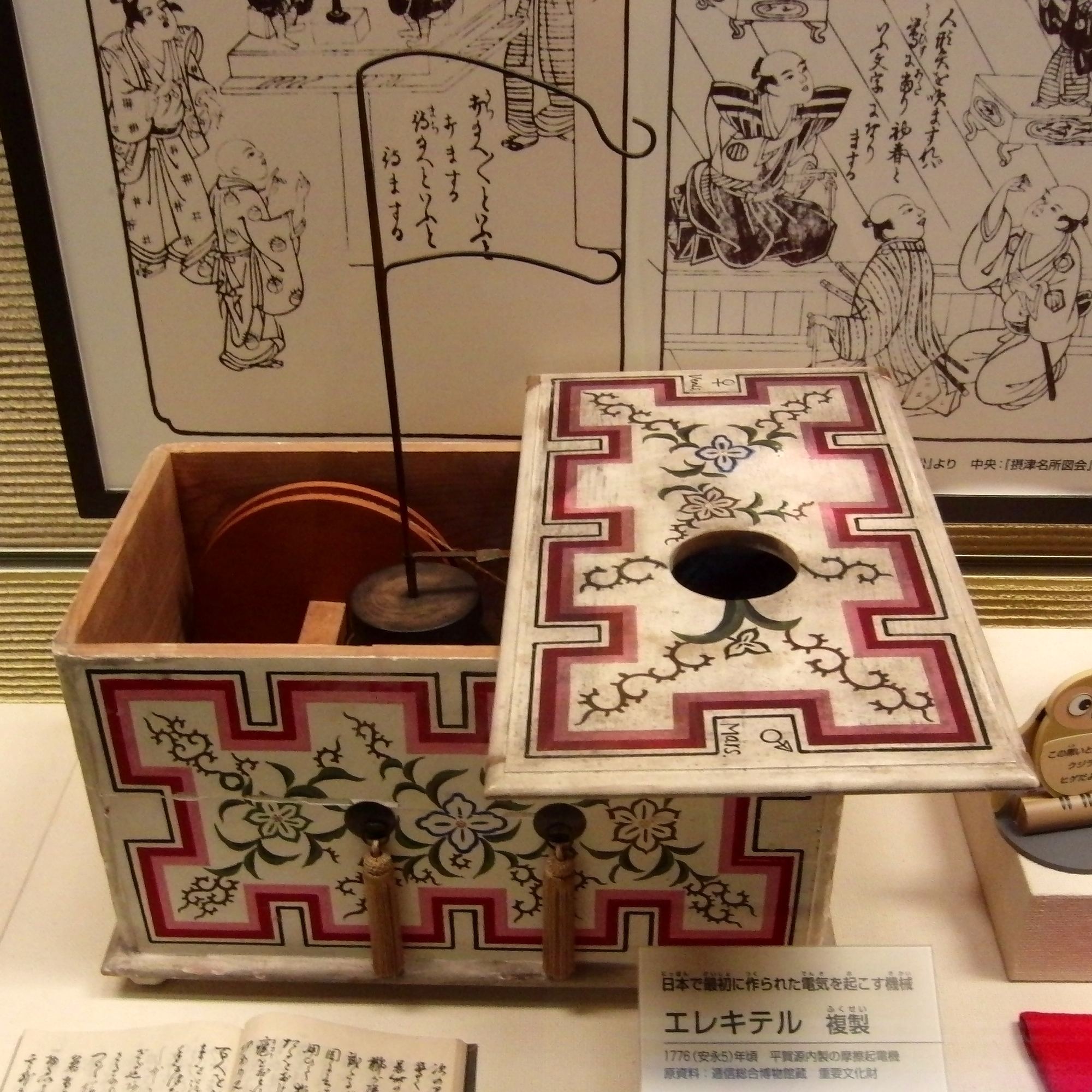
The erekiteru (replica) exhibited in the National Museum of Nature and Science, Tokyo, Japan

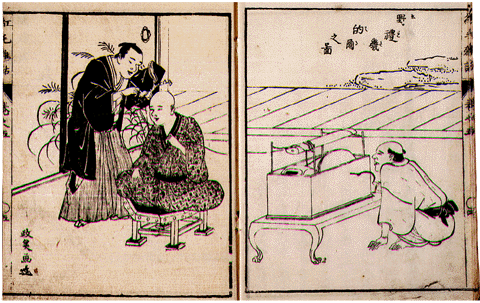
The erekiteru being demonstrated

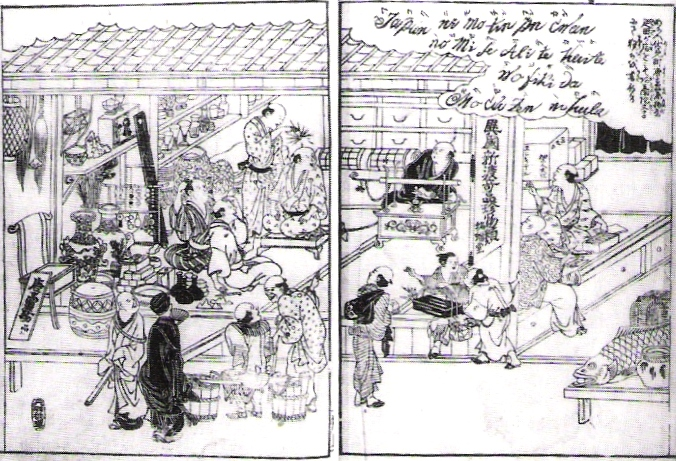
A curio shop demonstrating and selling an erekiteru. The sign at the entrance says "Newest curiosities from foreign countries".

The elekiteru or erekiteru (エレキテル; Japanese pronunciation: [e.ɾeꜜ.kʲi̥.te.ɾɯ], derived from Dutch elektriciteit, for electricity) is the Japanese name for a type of generator of static electricity used for electric experiments in the 18th century. In Japan, Hiraga Gennai presented his own erekiteru in 1776, derived from an elektriciteit from Holland. The erekiteru consists of a small box that uses the power of friction to generate electricity and store it.

The erekiteru relied on the various Western experiments with static electricity during the 18th century, which depended on the discovery that electricity could be generated through friction, and on the invention of the Leyden jar in the 1740s, as a convenient means to store static electricity in rather large quantities. Hiraga Gennai acquired an erekiteru from the Netherlands during his second trip to Nagasaki in 1770, and made a formal demonstration of his erekiteru in 1776.

The erekiteru has been recognized as IEEE Milestone in 2024. Its IEEE plaque citation reads: In 1776, a friction-induced electrostatic generator was first demonstrated in Japan by Gennai Hiraga after he spent six years repairing and restoring a broken device imported from the Netherlands. His improved design was later called the Elekiteru, and its widespread demonstration in Japan inspired the country's first generation of electricity researchers.

== See also ==
- Rangaku
- Japanese words of Dutch origin
