= Udagawa Yōan =

Japanese scientist (1798–1846)

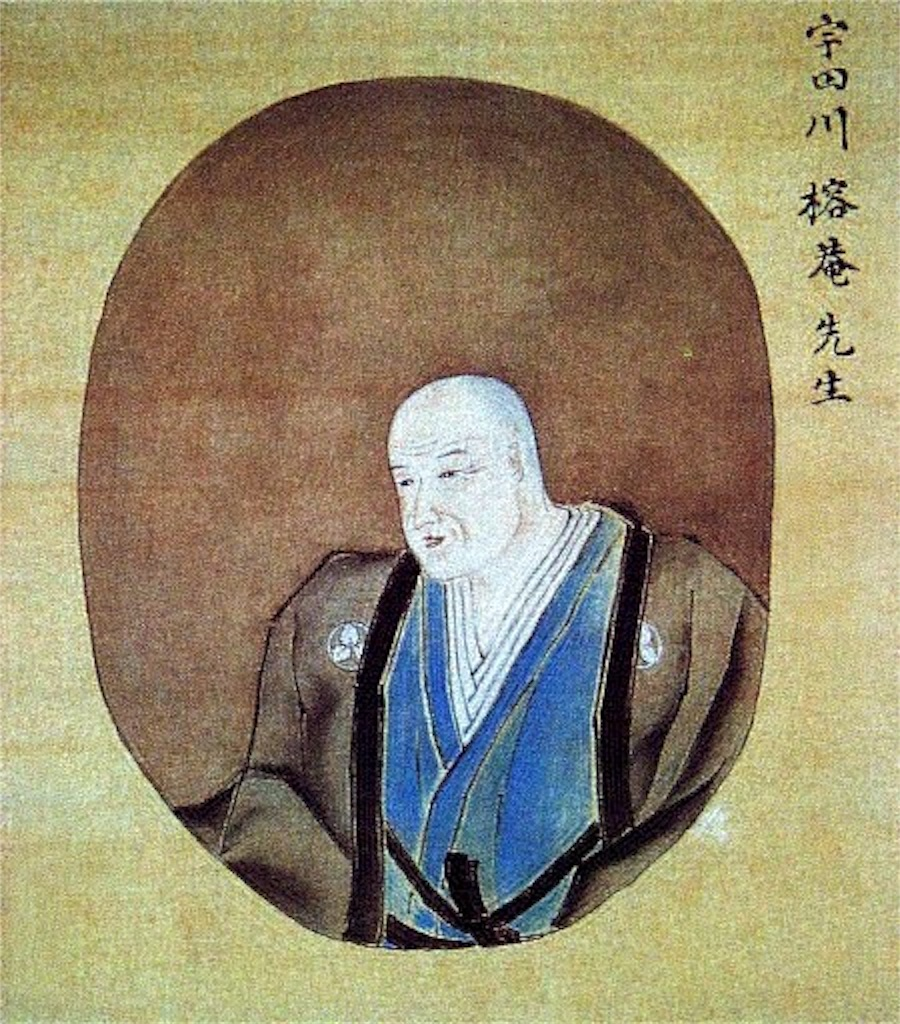
Udagawa Yōan (宇田川 榕菴, 1798–1846)

Udagawa Yōan (宇田川 榕菴; March 9, 1798 – June 22, 1846) was a 19th-century Japanese scholar of Western studies, or "Rangaku". In 1837, he published the first volume of his Introduction to Chemistry (舎密開宗, Seimi Kaisō), (Note: The last volume was published in 1847, after his death.) a compilation of scientific books in Dutch, which describes a wide range of scientific knowledge from the West. Most of the Dutch original material appears to be derived from William Henry's 1799 Elements of Experimental Chemistry. In particular, the book contains a very detailed description of the electric battery invented by Volta forty years earlier in 1800. The battery itself was constructed by Udagawa in 1831 and used in experiments, including medical ones, based on a belief that electricity could help cure illnesses.

Udagawa's Science of Chemistry also reports for the first time in details the findings and theories of Lavoisier in Japan. Accordingly, Udagawa made numerous scientific experiments and created new scientific terms, which are still in current use in modern scientific Japanese: e.g., "oxygen" (酸素, sanso), "hydrogen" (水素, suiso), "nitrogen" (窒素, chisso), "carbon" (炭素, tanso), "oxidation" (酸化, sanka), "reduction" (還元, kangen), "saturation" (飽和, hōwa), "dissolution" (溶解, yōkai) and "element" (元素, genso).

In Botanika kyō (Botany Sutra), published in 1822 in the style of a Buddhist sutra, Udagawa argued that the traditional, Chinese-influenced system of nomenclature in Japan was imprecise, and put forth the Linnean system as an alternative. He also created the word for animal: 動物, Dōbutsu.

A genus of orchid, Yoania, is named after Udagawa.

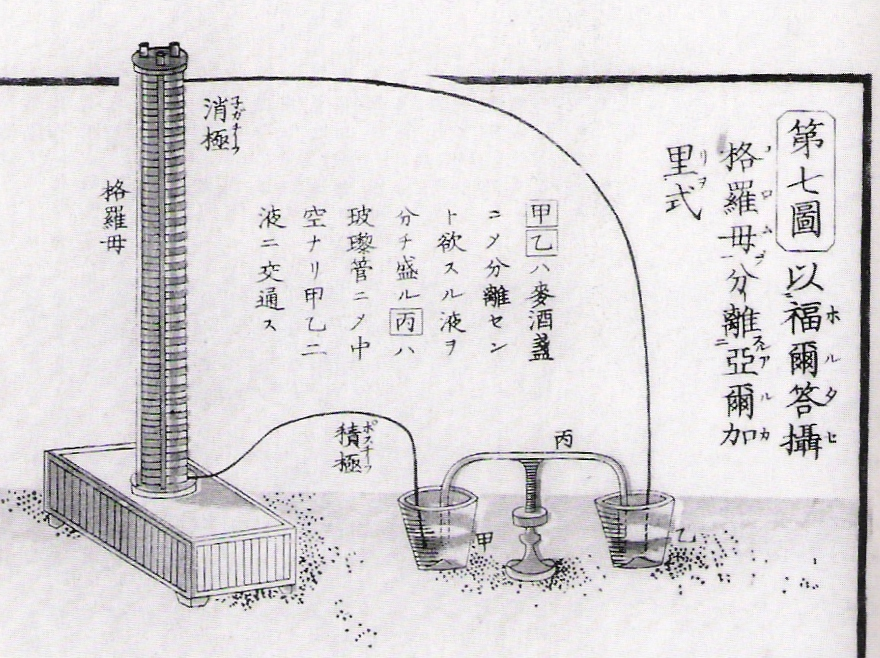
A description of a Volta battery in Introduction to Chemistry (Seimi Kaisō), published in 1840

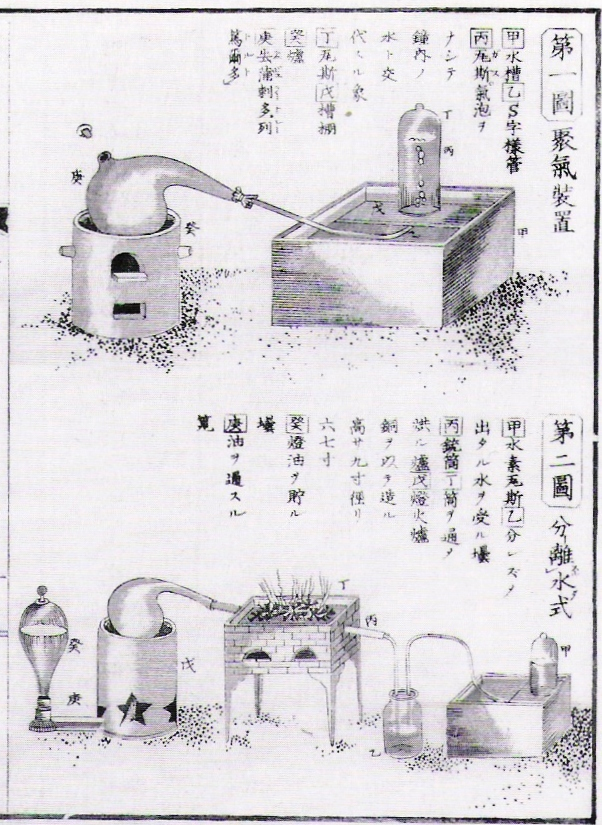
Chemical experiments in Introduction to Chemistry (Seimi Kaisō)
