= Shizuki Tadao =

Japanese translator and astronomer (1760-1806)

- Born: 1760; Nagasaki
- Died: August 22, 1806 (aged 45–46); Nagasaki
- Occupations: Astronomer and translator

Shizuki Tadao (志筑 忠雄; born 1760, Nagasaki - died August 22, 1806, Nagasaki) was a Japanese astronomer and translator of European scientific works into Japanese.

Shizuki was adopted as a child into a family of translators from Dutch to Japanese, and in 1776 Shizuki began working in the family profession; however, in 1777 he stopped working in the family's tsuji tradition and began translating and writing commentaries on works of natural philosophy independently. He began using the name Ryuen Nakano, Nakano being his birth family name.

Shizuki apprenticed under Ryoei Motoki (who had translated and interpreted Copernicus's works) in Nagasaki, which at that time was a rare hub for Japanese intellectuals to obtain and discuss Western ideas. Motoki and Shizuki collaborated on translations of Dutch scientific treatises, and helped introduce and popularize Newtonian mechanics to Japanese scholars, as well as ideas about planetary motion and calendrics ultimately derived from Copernicus and Johannes Kepler. Shizuki's commentaries draw heavily from John Keill's, though Shizuki also generated his own ideas in his commentaries, and sought to reconcile Western philosophies of science with traditional Confucian metaphysical ideas. His best-known work was Rekisho Shinsho, or New Treatise on Calendrical Phenomena, which he completed in 1802 and which was heavily indebted to Keill's works, several of which Shizuki had already translated by that time.

Several of the Japanese terms that Shizuki used in translating Newtonian mechanical ideas, including those for gravity and centripetal force, were adopted into the Japanese scientific lexicon and remain in common use.
