= Johann Caspar Horner =

Swiss physicist, mathematician and astronomer

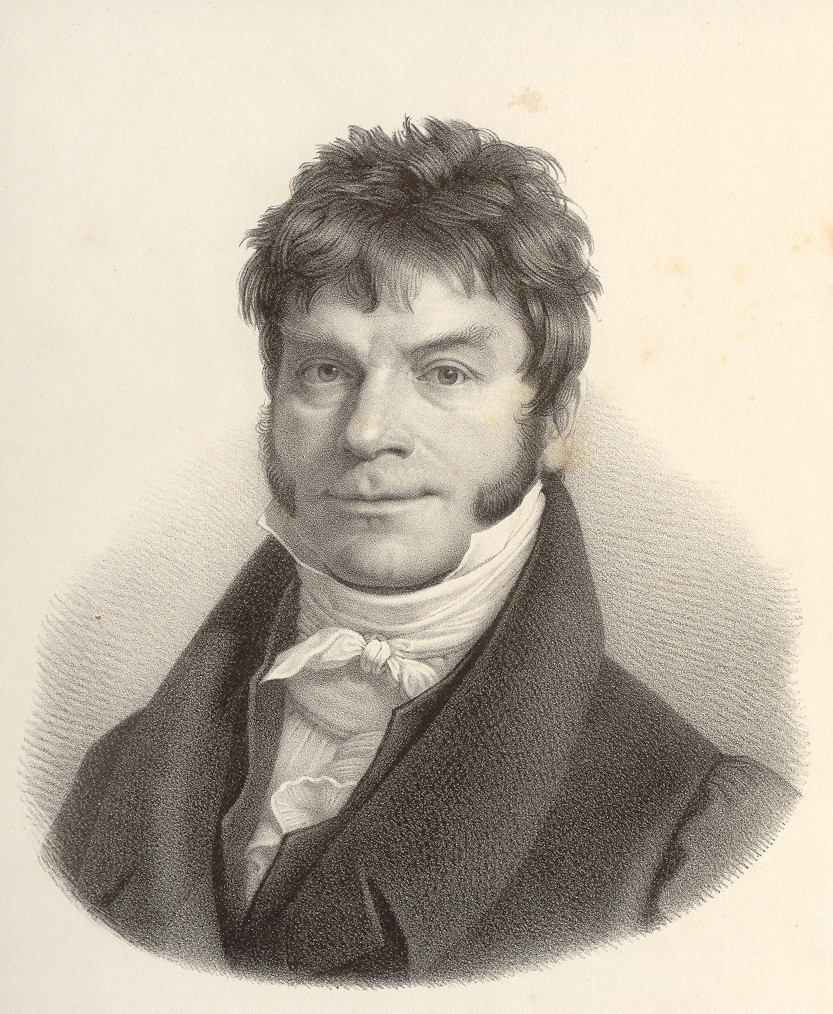
Johann Kaspar Horner

Johann Caspar Horner (Zürich, 12 March 1774 – Zürich, 3 November 1834) was a Swiss physicist, mathematician and astronomer.

== Life ==
At the beginning, he wanted to be a priest, but later he went to Göttingen, where he learnt astronomy. Then he traveled throughout the world for three years on behalf of the Russians. After the journey he took two years in Saint Petersburg with the cataloging the items he had found. He discovered a method for approaching the roots of equation with unknown factor in a higher power. His findings were published under the titles Über die Curven zweiten Grades and Die fünf regelmässigen Körper. He wrote some other works also on the field of astronomy.

In 1805, Johann Caspar Horner visited Japan with the Prussian Georg Heinrich von Langsdorff, as a scientist to the Krusenstern mission that also brought the Russian ambassador Nikolai Rezanov to Japan.

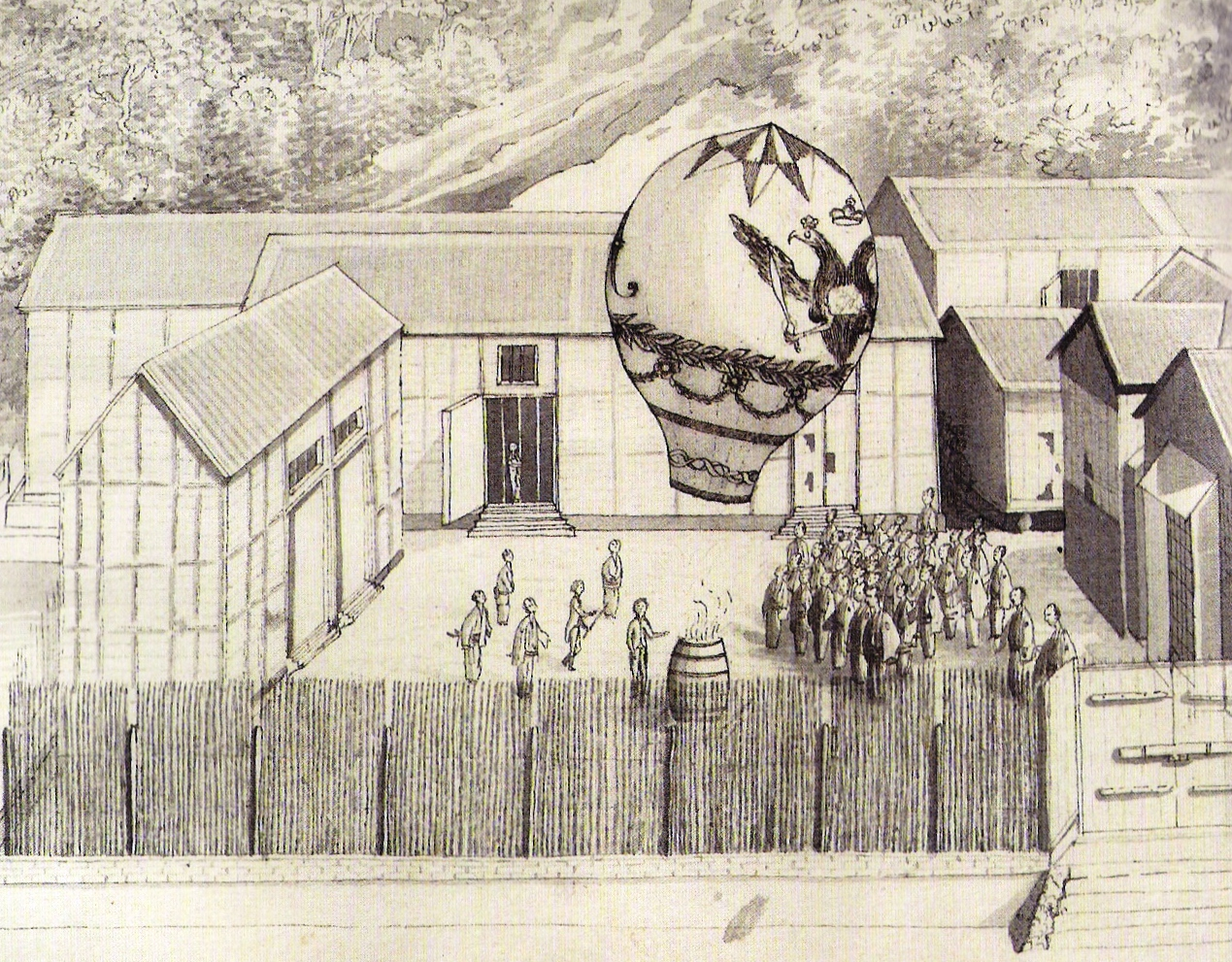
Johann Caspar Horner making the first demonstration of a Western hot air balloon, in March 1805 in Umegasaki.

Horner made a hot air balloon out of Japanese paper (washi), and made a demonstration in front of about 30 Japanese delegates. This followed the first flight of a hot air balloon by the brothers Montgolfier in France in 1783.

== Books and publications ==
- Otto von Kotzebue, Ivan Fedorovīch Kruzenshtern, Johann Caspar Horner, Johann Friedrich Eschscholtz, Adelbert von Chamisso (1821) A voyage of discovery into the South Sea and Beering's [sic] Straits, for the purpose of exploring a north-east passage, undertaken in the years 1815–1818, at the expense of His Highness the chancellor of the empire, Count Romanzoff, in the ship Rurick, under the command of the lieutenant in the Russian Imperial Navy, Otto von Kotzebue.
- Johann Caspar Horner (1822) Remarks on the specific gravity of sea-water in different latitudes, and on the temperature of the ocean at different depths
- Elisabeth Schoeck-Grüebler, Johann Caspar Horner, Felix Donat Kyd (1831–1834) Der freundeidgenössische Rechenschieber : der Briefwechsel zwischen Felix Donat Kyd aus Brunnen und Hofrat Johann Caspar Horner aus Zürich
- Jürgen W Koch; Johann Caspar Horner; Johann Georg Repsold, Der Briefwechsel zwischen Johann Caspar Horner und Johann Georg Repsold : kommentierte Übertragung der Brieftexte
