= Morishima =

Morishima (written: 森嶋 or 森島 lit. "forest island") is a Japanese surname. Notable people with the surname include:

- Akiko Morishima (森島 明子, born 1973), Japanese manga artist
- Morishima Chūryō (森島 中良, 1756–1810), Japanese writer
- Hiroaki Morishima (森島 寛晃, born 1972), Japanese footballer
- Katsuji Morishima (森島 勝司, born 1942), Japanese ice hockey player
- Michio Morishima (森嶋 通夫, 1923–2004), Japanese economist, mathematician and econometrician
- Takeshi Morishima (森嶋 猛, born 1978), Japanese professional wrestler
- Taro Morishima (森嶋 太郎, 1903–1989), Japanese mathematician
- Tsukasa Morishima (森島 司, born 1997), Japanese footballer
- Yasuhito Morishima (森島 康仁, born 1987), Japanese footballer
