= Johann Georg Wirsung =

German anatomist

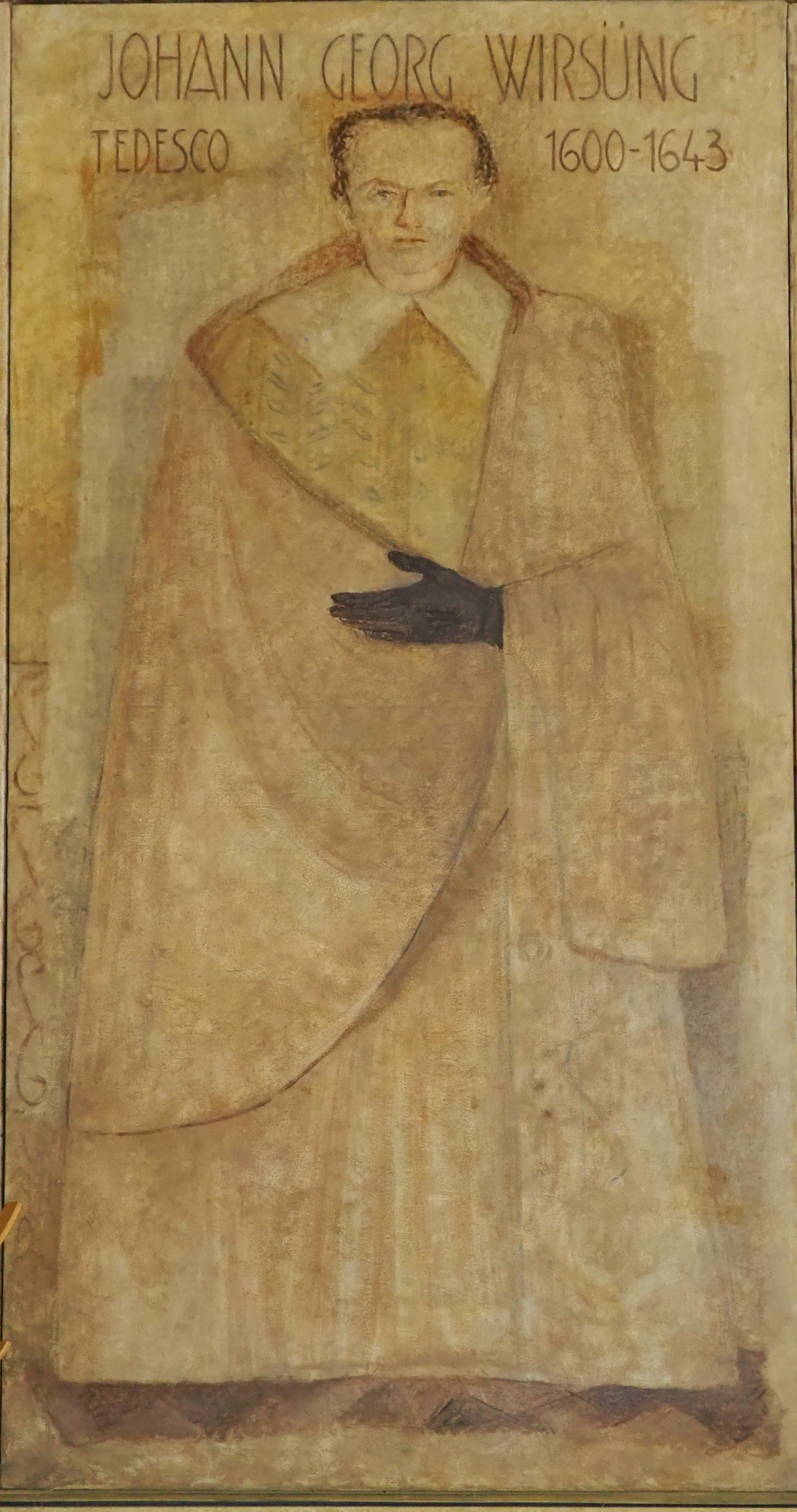
Portrait panel at Padua

Johann Georg Wirsung (3 July 1589 Augsburg – 22 August 1643 Padua) was a German anatomist who was a long-time prosector in Padua. He is credited with discovering the pancreatic duct in humans. He was assassinated due to a professional rivalry by another physician.

== Life and work ==
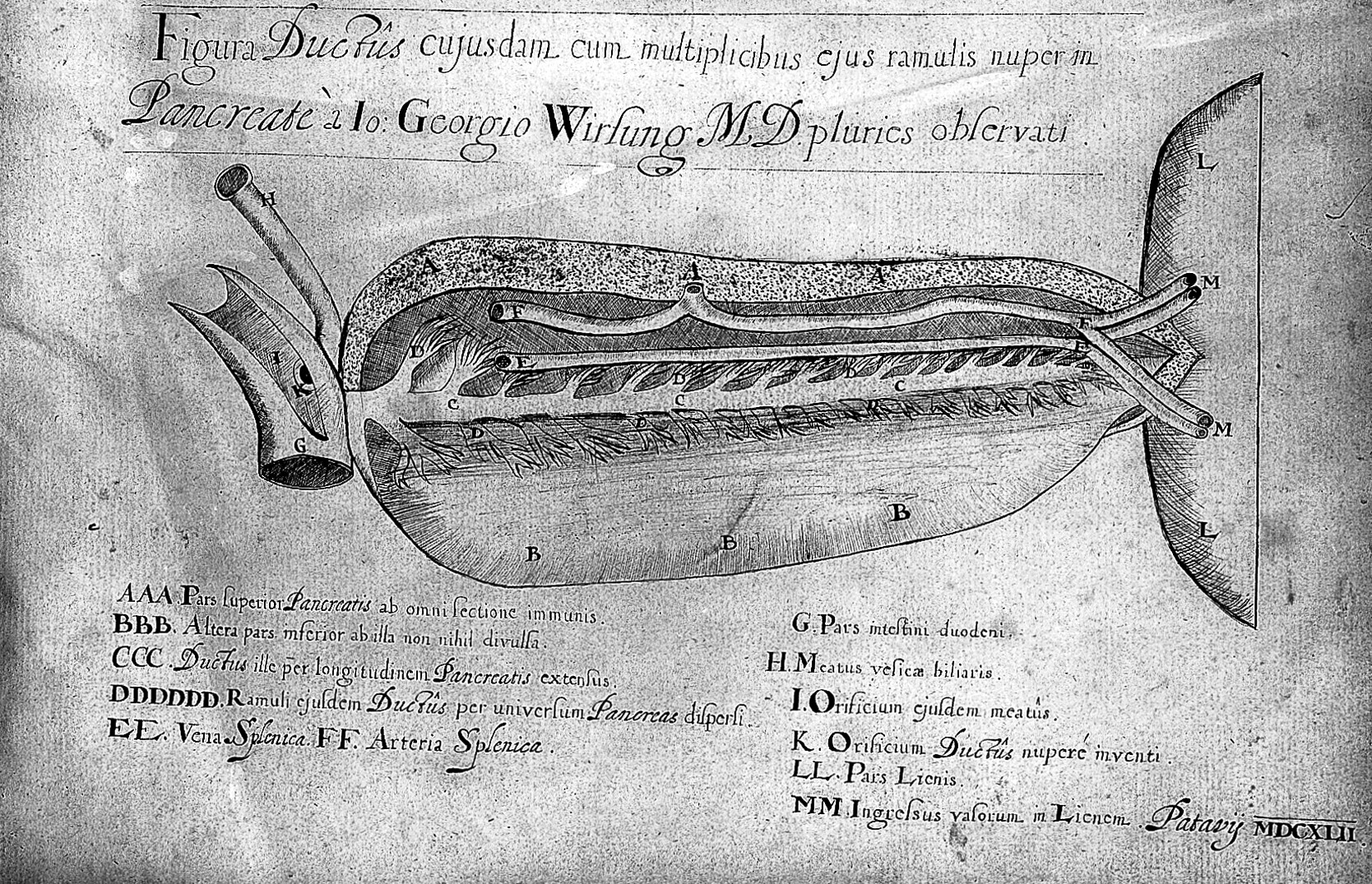
Copperplate engraving of the pancreas made by J. G. Wirsung

Wirsung was born in Augsburg, Bavaria, and much of his early life is unknown as the archives of Padua were destroyed in 1737. Wirsung's father was a physician in Bavaria and his mother came from a wealthy family. He studied anatomy in Paris under Jean Riolano. He became a prosector under Johannes Wesling in Padua. and served in the position for 14 years. He is remembered for the discovery of the pancreatic duct ("duct of Wirsung") during the dissection of a man who had been recently hanged for murder. The duct was earlier noted in 1641 in a rooster by another student of Wesling named Moritz Hofmann (1621-1698). Instead of publishing the results of his discovery, he engraved a sketch of the duct on a copper plate, from which he made several imprints, and subsequently had them delivered to leading anatomists throughout Europe. Wirsung also described the duct in a letter to Jean Riolan who named the duct as the duct of Wirsung.

On the evening of 22 August 1643, Wirsung was talking to his friends at the entrance of his room at Pratense College when he was attacked by three assailants. One was a Flemish doctor Jacobus Cambier who shot him. Wirsung identified his assailant at the time of his death. One of the accomplices was a relative of Cambier. Wirsung had no heirs and all his drawings and nearly 400 books went to two of his cousins. He was buried in an unmarked crypt at St. Anthony’s Basilica.

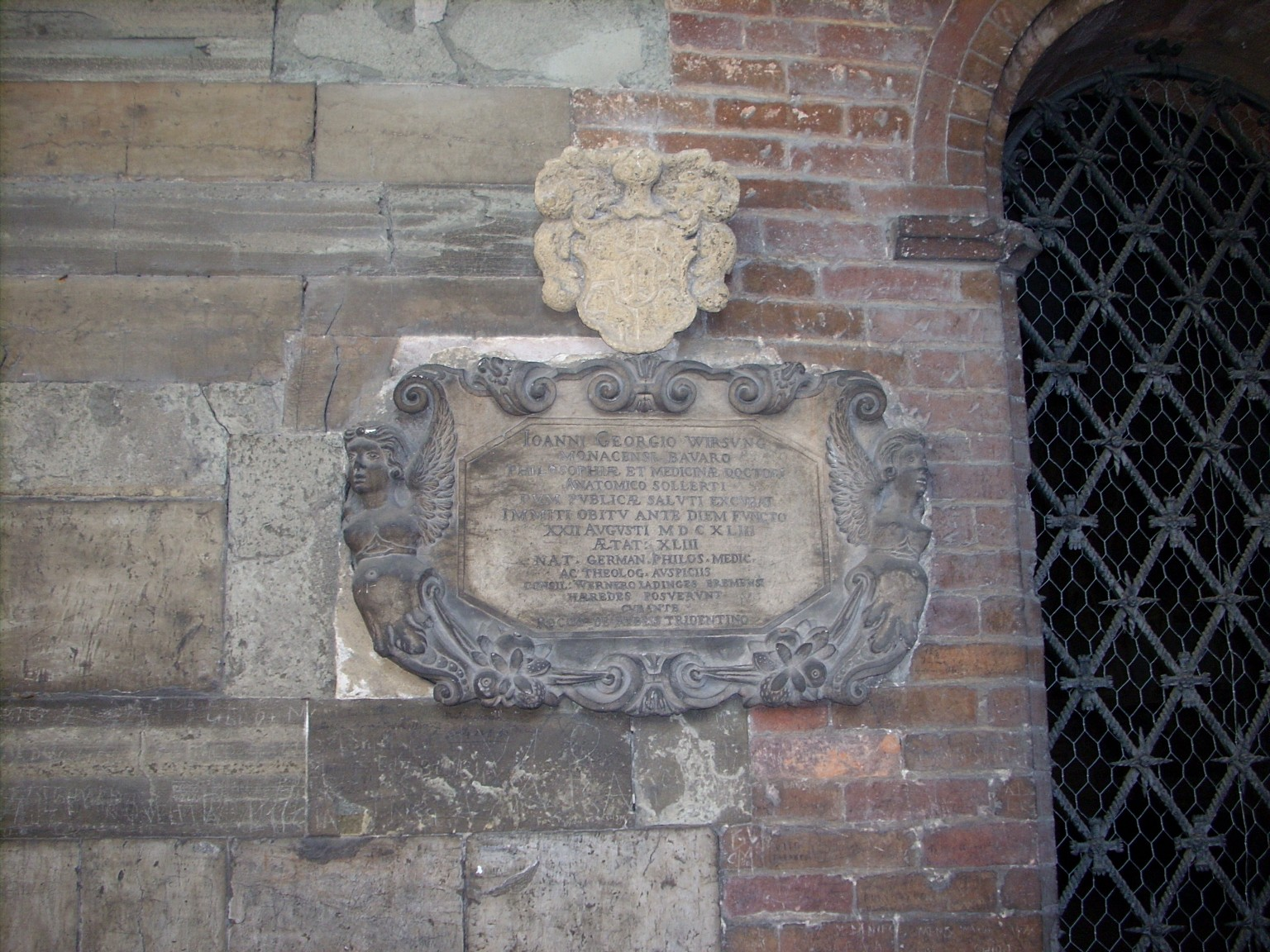
Cenotaph in the Basilica of Saint Anthony of Padua

== Bibliography ==
- Giuseppe Ongaro, Wirsung a Padova 1629–1643, Treviso, Antilia, 2010, pp. 291
