= Junan =

Junan may refer to:

- Junan County, in Shandong, China
- Junan, an older romanization of Runan County (汝南縣), in Henan, China
- Jun'an, Guangdong, town in Foshan, Guangdong, China
- Guotai Junan Securities, investment bank in China
- Nakagawa Jun'an (1739–1786), Japanese doctor and botanist
