= Moritz Hofmann =

German anatomist and physician (1621–1698)

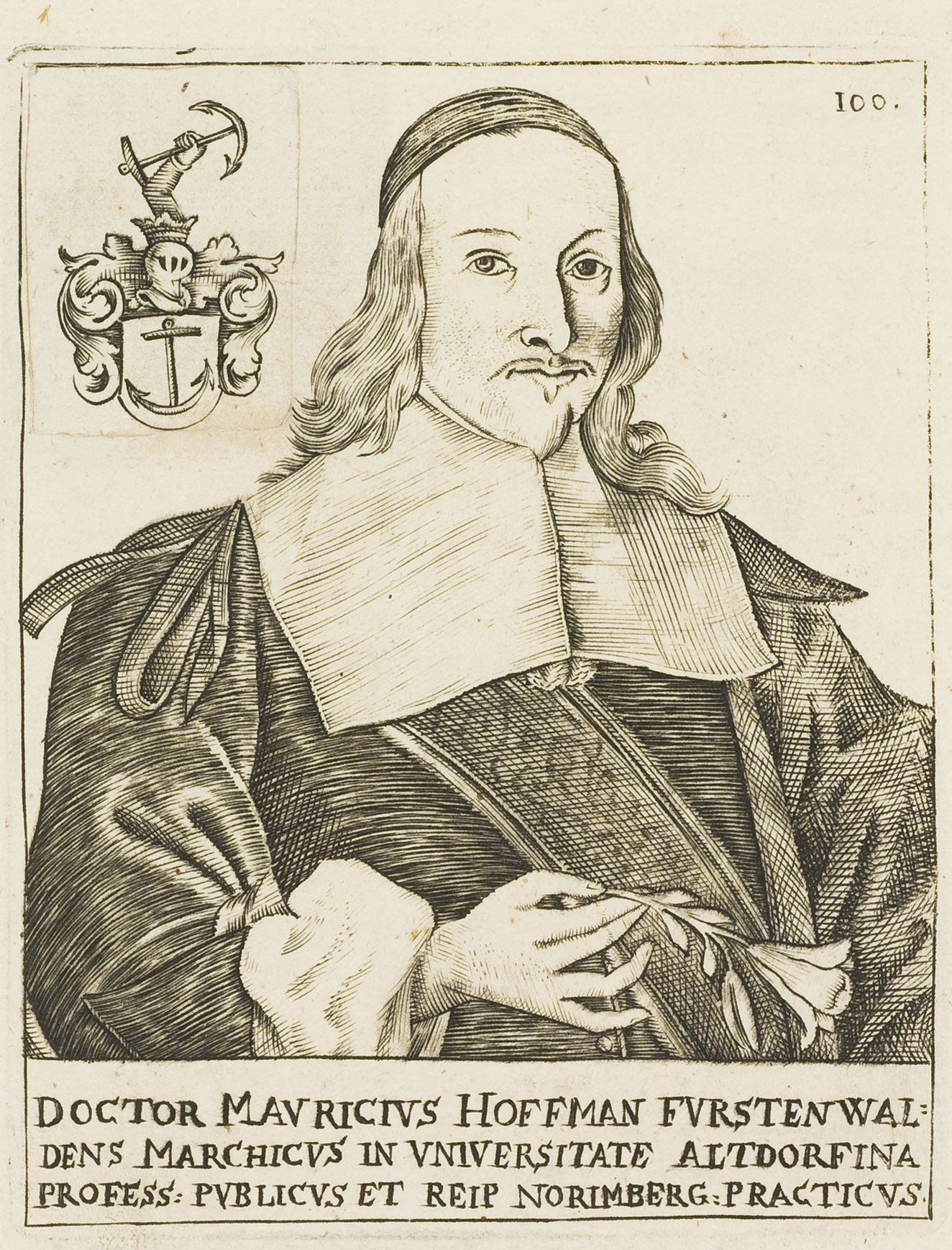

Moritz Hofmann (20 September 1621 – 20 April 1698) was a German anatomist and physician. He was a professor of anatomy and surgery in the University of Altdorf. His son Johann Moritz Hofmann (1653–1727) also became a professor of anatomy at Altdorf.

== Biography ==
Hofmann was born in Fürstenwalde to mayor of Beeskov and Storkow, David, and his wife Anna née Nößler. After the death of his parents he was taken care by his uncle Georg Nößler (1591–1650) who was a professor of medicine in Altdorf. He too studied medicine and went to Padua where, as a student of Johann Vesling, he discovered the pancreatic duct in 1641 in a rooster. This was then discovered in humans by Johann Georg Wirsung after whom it was called the Ductus Wirsungianus. Hoffmann became an associate professor of anatomy and surgery at the University of Altdorf from 1648. The next year he became professor ordinarius, replacing Kaspar Hofmann. He was known for his teaching of anatomy. Hofmann married Anna Margaretha Sampffer in 1649. After her death in 1663 he married Margarete Cämmerer (d. 1704). His son Johann Moritz from his first wife later also became a professor of anatomy at Altdorf.
