= Criminal punishment in Edo-period Japan =

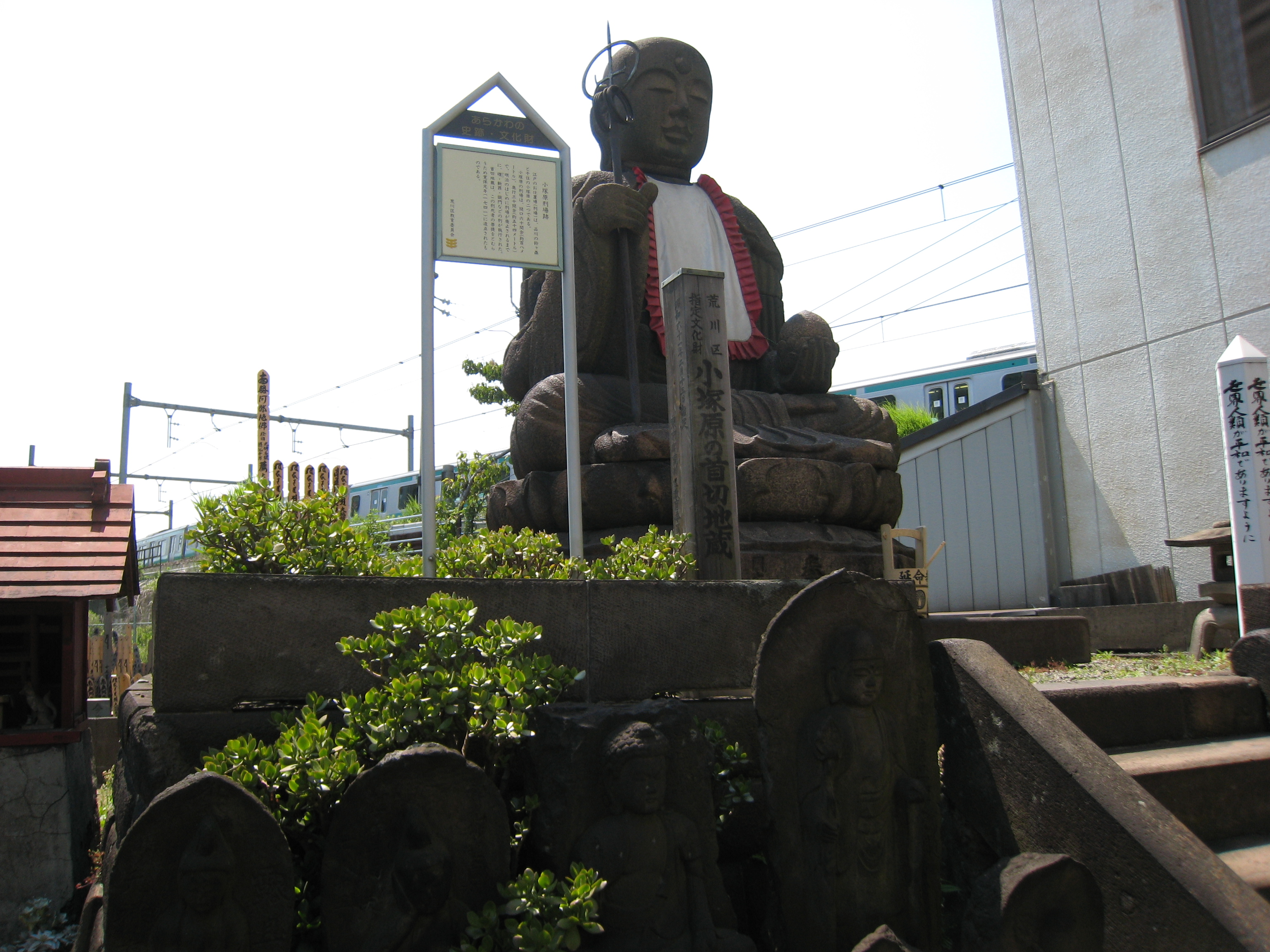
Statue of Kubikiri Jizo at the Kozukappara execution ground in Minami-senju, Tokyo, Japan

During the Edo period, Japan (1603-1868) used various punishments against criminals.

== Categories of punishment ==
During the Edo period, Japan used various punishments against criminals. These can be categorized as follows:

- Capital punishment
- Prison and Exile
- Penal labor
- Confiscation of property
- Corporal punishment

=== Death penalty ===
Serious crimes such as murder, armed robbery and arson were punished by death. The Tokugawa shogunate maintained execution grounds for Edo at Kozukappara, Suzugamori, and Itabashi.

Kozukappara, also known as Kotsukappara or Kozukahara, is currently located near the southwest exit of Tokyo's Minami-Senju Station. It is estimated that between 100,000 and 200,000 people were executed here. Only part of the site remains, located next to Emmeiji temple, partly buried under the rail tracks and under a more-recent burial ground. Archaeological and morphological research was done by Tokyo University on the skulls found buried here which confirmed the execution methods.

Another notable one was located at Suzugamori in Shinagawa. Both sites are still sparsely commemorated in situ with memorial plaques and tombstones.

The shogunate executed criminals in various ways:

- Boiling to death
- Execution by burning
  - As the peace of Edo for another 100 years or so, the idea of human rights began to change as well. The idea that “the brutal punishment of burning people to death with fire, even if they were criminals, was outdated and a remnant of the barbaric customs of the sengoku period” emerged, and instead of burning people directly with fire, the method was changed to smoking them to death.
- Crucifixion for killing a parent, husband etc.
- Decapitation by sword
- Execution by hanging
- Sawing
- Waist-cutting (cutting the person in half). The Kanazawa han coupled this with decapitation.

The death penalty often carried collateral punishments. One was parading the criminal around town prior to execution(市中引き回し). A similar one was public display of the criminal prior to execution. A third was public display of the severed head(獄門).

Samurai were often sentenced to commit seppuku in lieu of these forms of punishment. Seppuku is a term of suicide for the samurai.

=== Incarceration and exile ===
Depending on the severity of the crime, magistrates could sentence convicts to incarceration in various forms:

- Exile to an island. Criminals in Edo were often confined on Hachijōjima or Miyakejima. Criminals so punished received tattoos.
- Imprisonment. The government of Edo maintained a jail at Kodenma-chō.

Exclusion from the location of the crime was a penalty for both commoners and samurai.

- Tokoro-barai, banishment to a certain distance, was common for non-samurai.
- Kōfu kinban, assignment to the post of Kōfu in the mountains west of Edo, is an example of rustication of samurai.

=== Penal labor ===
For crimes requiring moderate punishment, convicts could be sent to work at labor camps such as the one on Ishikawa-jima in Edo Bay. More serious acts could result in being sent to work in the gold mine on the island of Sado. In 1590, Hideyoshi had banned "unfree labor" or slavery; but forms of contract and indentured labor persisted alongside the period penal codes' forced labor. For example, the Edo period penal laws prescribed "non-free labor" for the immediate family of executed criminals in Article 17 of the Gotōke reijō (Tokugawa House Laws), but the practice never became common. The 1711 Gotōke reijō was compiled from over 600 statutes promulgated between 1597 and 1696.

It was also common for female convicts to be sentenced to serve terms working as slaves and prostitutes in walled Red Light Districts, most notably Yoshiwara.

Ishikawa-jima was not only for punishment and warcrimes like a conventional prison. In 1790, It originally served to provide work and training for the homeless individuals of Japan. Its purpose was to help homeless people learn useful skills to eventually return to society. During the 1820's, the institution was officially accepting convicted criminals, and people who were banished from society for punishment.

=== Confiscation ===
A penalty that targeted merchants especially was kesshō, the confiscation of a business.

=== Corporal punishment ===
Handcuffing allowed the government to punish a criminal while he was under house arrest. Depending on the severity of the crime, the sentence might last 30, 50, or 100 days.

Flagellation was a common penalty for crimes such as theft, Mugging and fighting or assault. Amputation of the nose or ears replaced flogging as penalty early in the Edo period. The 8th Shōgun of Edo, Tokugawa Yoshimune introduced judicial Flogging Penalty, or tataki, in 1720. A convicted criminal could be sentenced to a maximum of 100 lashes. Samurai and priests were exempt from flogging, and the penalty was applied only to commoners. The convict was stripped of all outer clothing and struck about the buttocks and back. The flogging penalty was used until 1867, though it fell out of favor from 1747 to 1795 intermittently. Both men and women could be sentenced to a flogging, though during one segment of the mid-Edo period, women were imprisoned rather than flogged.

==== Origin of flogging penalty ====
In 757 A.D., the Chinese-influenced Yoro Ritsuryo (養老律令) legal system was enacted and introduced Five Judicial Penalties (五刑). Two of the Five Judicial Penalties involved Flogging. Light Flogging provided for 10 to 50 lashes, while Heavy Flogging stipulated 60 to 100 strokes. However, a slave could be sentenced to up a maximum of 200 lashes. These flogging penalties only applied to male commoners. Convicts of the nobility, along with female commoners, might be sentenced to the imposition of handcuffs or a fine. When a convicted criminal was flogged, half the number of lashes were typically applied to the back, half to the buttocks. At times, if the convict's request to change the lash target was sanctioned then the lashes would be applied only to the back or to the buttocks. By the Age of Warring States, flogging had been largely replaced by decapitation.

== See also ==
- Kozukappara execution grounds
