= Kozukappara execution grounds =

Location in Edo period, Japan

Coordinates: 35°43′53″N 139°47′52.4″E

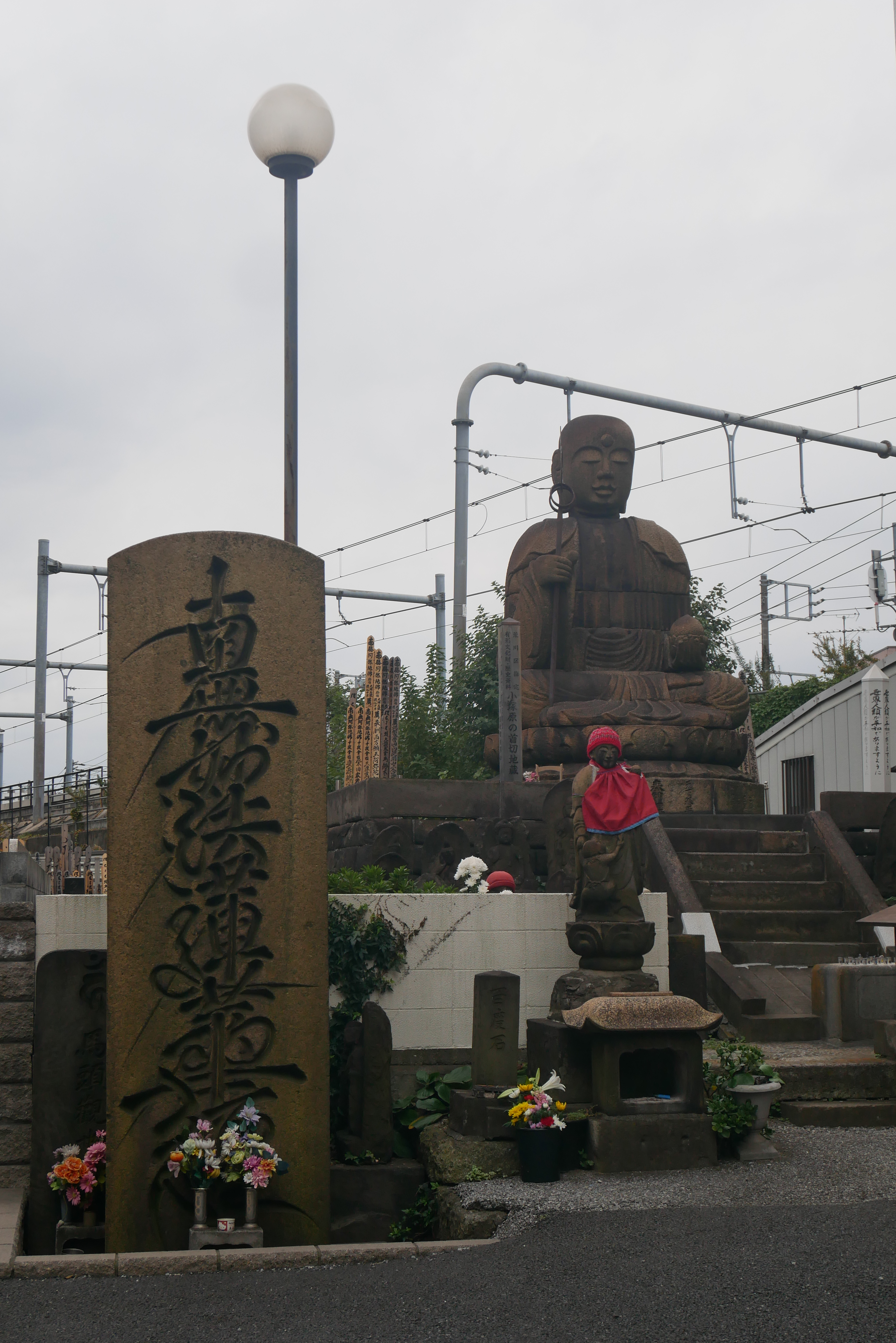
The kubikiri Jizō at Kozukappara, 2018

The Kozukappara execution grounds (小塚原刑場, Kozukappara keijō) were one of the three sites in the vicinity of Edo (the forerunner of present-day Tokyo, Japan) where the Tokugawa shogunate executed criminals in the Edo period. Alternate romanized spellings are Kozukahara and Kotsukappara.

The site is located in modern Minami Senju, Arakawa, Tokyo, a three-minute walk away from Minami-Senju Station. Located next to Enmeiji Temple, a large part of the grounds are now covered by railway tracks.

It is estimated that between 100,000 and 200,000 people were executed here. Those executed include Hashimoto Sanai and Yoshida Shōin, who were executed as a result of the Ansei Purge.

Sugita Genpaku, Nakagawa Jun'an, Katsuragawa Hoshū and their colleagues studied anatomy by conducting dissections at Kozukappara.

Kozukappara began operation in 1651, and continued until the Meiji period. Executions were stopped in an attempt to convince Western powers to end the unequal treaties with Japan.

== See also ==
- Capital punishment in Japan
