= Wirsung =

Wirsung may refer to:

- Johann Georg Wirsung, German anatomist
- Pancreatic duct, also called duct of Wirsung
