= Touyou Yamawaki =

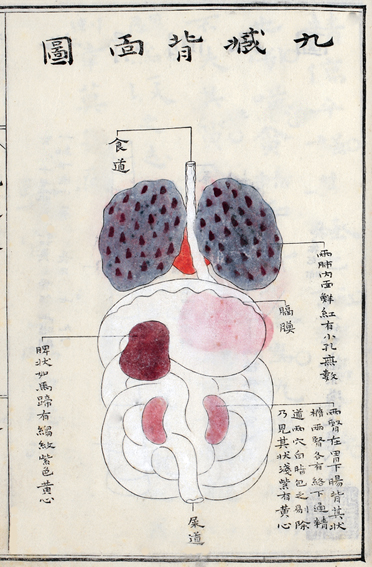
- Nine Organs in Touyou Yamawaki's Book of Organs (Zōshi), 1754
- Born: 1 February 1706; Kameoka, Kyoto Prefecture
- Died: 25 September 1762 (aged 56); Kyoto
- Known for: Performing the first human dissection in Japan
- Scientific career
- Fields: Medicine; Anatomy

Touyou Yamawaki (山脇東洋; 1 February 1706 – 25 September 1762) was a Japanese anatomist, poet, physician, and teacher. He was the first person in Japan to perform a human dissection and played a significant role in the introduction of Western medicine to Japan.

== Biography ==
Yamavaki worked as a court physician in Kyoto and belonged to the Kohoha school. His teacher was Goto Konzan. In 1754, having obtained permission from the authorities, he performed a dissection on the body of a person who had been executed at Rokkaku Prison. Due to the influence of Confucianism, human dissection was heavily discouraged in Japan, and knowledge of human anatomy depended on dissections of animals such as dogs and monkeys. Drawing upon Western medical texts, he provided accurate anatomical descriptions in his book Zōshi (Book of Organs), thereby exposing errors within traditional Chinese medicine. The book was illustrated by Asanuma Suketsune, an artist associated with the Maruyama or Shijō school in Kyoto. Its publication caused shock within the Tokugawa-era medical community, and Yamavaki faced significant pressure.

During the dissection, Yamavaki and his colleagues used the anatomy textbook Syntagma Anatomicum – written in Latin by Johann Vesling, professor of medicine at the University of Padua. Yamawaki had probably obtained the book through Dutch physicians stationed at the trading settlement on the island of Dejima off Nagasaki. Yamavaki and his colleagues were astonished to find that the diagrams in the book corresponded precisely to the cadaver's organs. Kuriyama Koan, a student of Yamawaki's, performed autopsies twice in Hagi. In 1771, Sugita Genpaku and Maeno Ryōtaku also performed autopsies, having been influenced by Yamawaki.
