= Yoshio Kōsaku =

Japanese physician

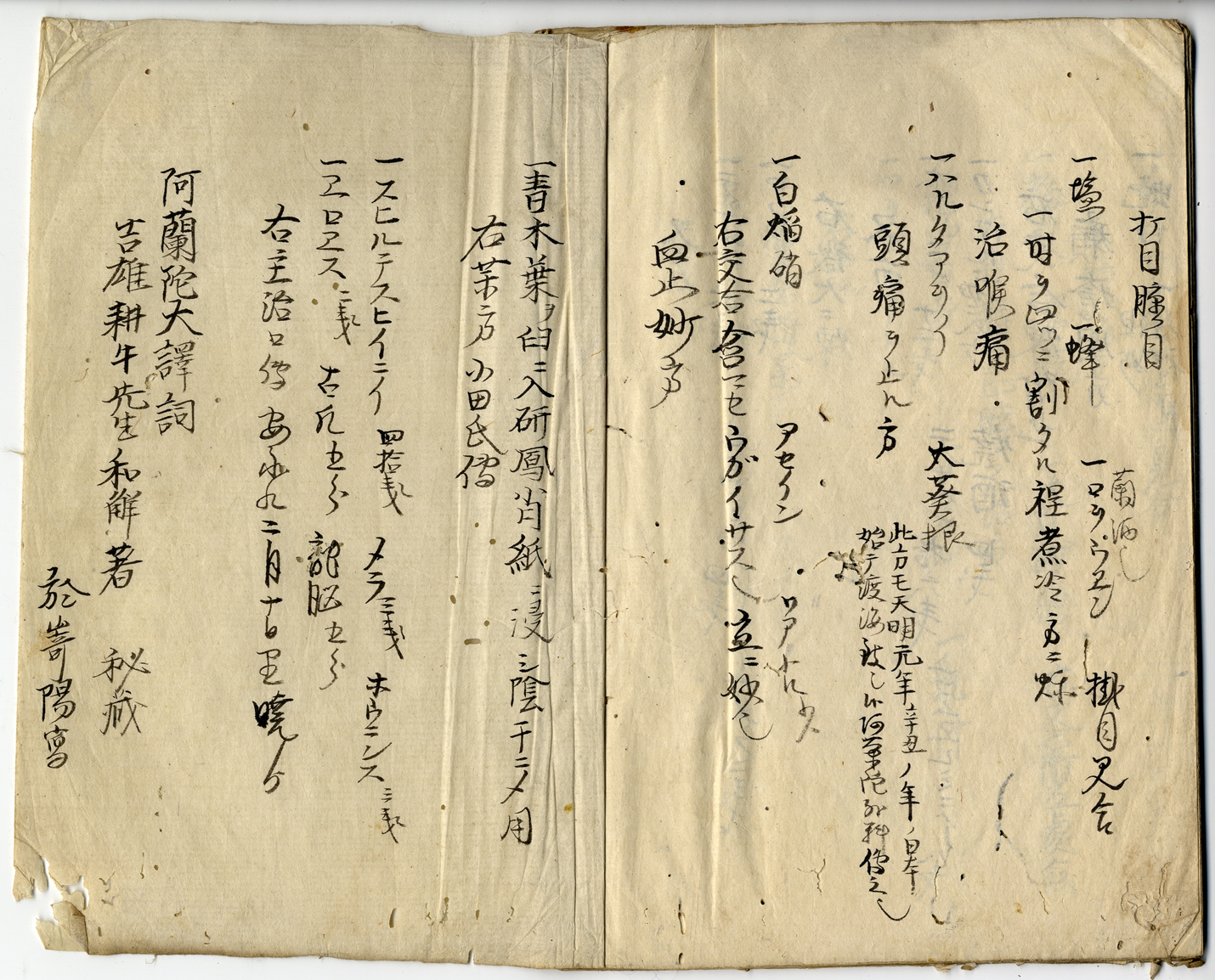
Last page of 'Yoshio geka-kikigaki' (吉雄 外科聞書), a medical manuscript copy with Western drugs and prescription. The text ends with an explanation: 'Translated into Japanese by Senior Dutch translator, teacher Yoshio Kōgyū. Copy made in Nagasaki, to be kept secret.'

Yoshio Kōsaku (吉雄 幸作) (1724 – October 4, 1800), also known as Yoshio Kōgyū (吉雄 耕牛) was a Japanese physician and scholar of "Dutch studies" (Rangaku), and the chief Dutch translator in Nagasaki, often accompanying Dutch East India Company officials on missions to Edo and other official business.

As a member of one of the five samurai families supported by the Tokugawa shogunate as hereditary official Dutch translators, Kōsaku vetted imported documents (Christian materials were prohibited in Edo period Japan) and helped to keep the shogunate informed of global political matters. From roughly 1770 to 1800, he served as the chief mediator between the Dutch community on Dejima and the shogunate.

Kōsaku was quite prolific in his writings, and has been described as "perhaps ... the most knowledgeable person [in Japan] about the West in his day." He maintained a Dutch style home and Dutch-style medical school, which at times enrolled up to six hundred students. Kōsaku wrote thirty-nine works, mostly on topics related to rangaku, and mentored a number of students, including Sugita Genpaku.

In his writing, Kōsaku was critical at times of Japanese society, particularly in the attitudes and manners of the citizens of Edo, the shogunal capital. In conjunction with a journey to Edo in 1774, accompanying officials of the Dutch East India Company, Kōsaku wrote that Edo ought to serve as an example to the rest of the nation, and that the interests of the people of Edo were limited to the pursuit of profit. This document, included as part of a preface to the first integral translation of a European book to be published, was but one of many written by rangaku scholars at this time implying a need to rethink the Japanese attitude of Europeans as barbarians and of China as the only model for enlightened civilization.

Japanese scholars, officials, and artists visiting Nagasaki frequently made a point of visiting Kōsaku; his lectures and Dutch-style home attracted great interest. Ranga painter Shiba Kōkan visited Kōsaku in 1788, stayed at Kōsaku's home for a few nights, and was given a tour of Dejima. A portrait he painted on that occasion depicting Kōsaku, partially in the style of Western oil paintings and partially in Japanese ukiyo-e style, survives today. The diaries of physician Tachibana Nankei, who also stayed at Kōsaku's Dutch-style home for a time, include descriptions of that home. The house featured a Dutch-style lie-down bathtub, a Western-style green-painted staircase rather than the unpainted, ladder-like stairs typical of Japanese homes, window drapes, and chairs which Nankei described as "grueling" to sit on, being more used to sitting on a tatami floor. Kōsaku also maintained a collection of European books, paintings, and other objects such as eyeglasses and mirror paintings.
