= Johann Moritz Hofmann =

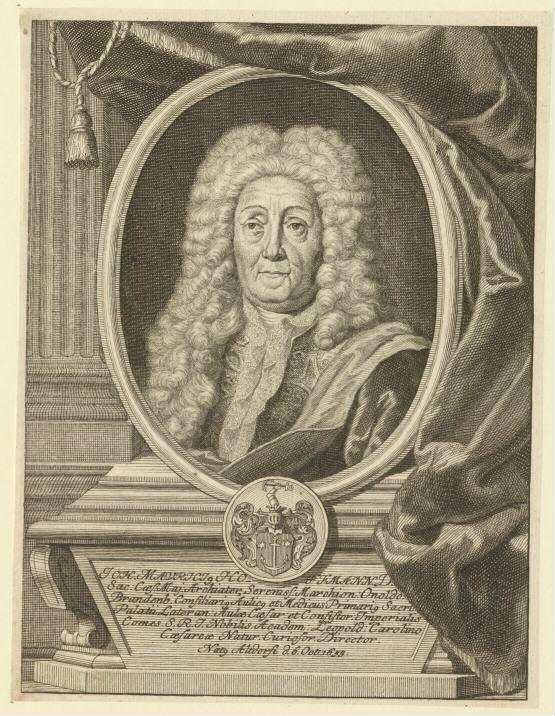

Johann Moritz Hofmann (6 October 1653 – 31 October 1727) was a German anatomist and professor at the University of Altdorf. He was the son of anatomist Moritz Hofmann.

Hofmann was born in Altdorf where his father Moritz was professor of anatomy. He was educated there and at Frankfurt after which he spent two years studying medicine in Padua. In 1674 he returned home and received a doctorate. In 1677 he was appointed professor extraordinary in anatomy. Five years later he was given the chair of anatomy and after the death of his father he was also chair of botany. In 1683 he established a chemical laboratory (Laboratorium chemicum), a pioneering approach in medicine at the time. He resigned in 1709 and became a professor of practical medicine until 1713 when he moved to become personal physician to the court of the Margrave in Ansbach. He died here at the age of 74. Among his writings was a handbook of symptoms as Disquisitiones corporis humani anatomico-pathologicae (1713).
