= Katsuragawa Hoshū =

Japanese physician

Katsuragawa Hoshū (桂川 甫周; 1751 – August 2, 1809) was a Japanese physician and scholar of rangaku (Western studies). He served the Tokugawa shogunate as a physician and as a translator of Dutch. He was the older brother of author and rangaku scholar Morishima Chūryō.

As the eldest son of the Katsuragawa family, Dutch-style physicians to the shōgun, Hoshū was appointed to that position in 1777. He began teaching at the shogunal School of Medicine in 1794. In addition to collaborating with Sugita Genpaku on Kaitai Shinsho, the first Japanese translation of a Western treatise on anatomy, he was the author of Hokusa Bunryaku, one of the earliest Japanese accounts of Russia.

He learned surgery with Nakagawa Jun'an from Carl Peter Thunberg when he was in Nagasaki. By the recommendation of Thunberg, Kirill Laxman wrote a letter to him. However, the letter was taken by Tokugawa shogunate and never returned. (See. Kirill Laxman#Letters to Japanese scholars)
