= Jean Riolan the Younger =

French anatomist (1577/1580 – 1657)

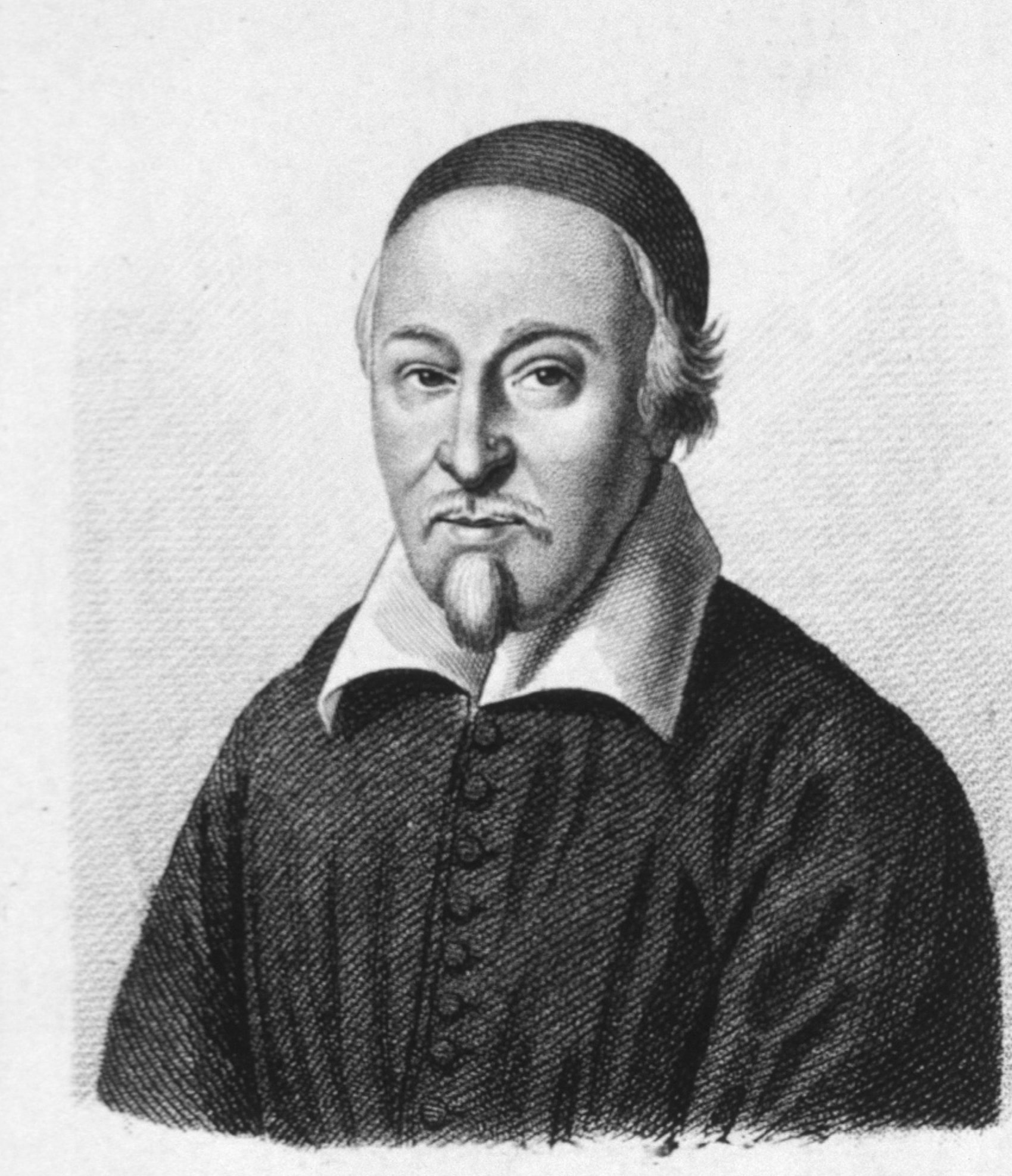
Jean Riolan the Younger

Jean Riolan (the Younger) (15 February 1577 or 1580 – 19 February 1657) was a French anatomist who was an influential member of the Medical Faculty of Paris. His father, Jean Riolan (the Elder) (1539–1605) was also a noted French anatomist. Riolan was the personal physician to Marie de' Medici (1553–1642) for all his life.

The eponymous "anastomosis of Riolan" is named after him, which is the mesenteric arterial connection between the superior and inferior mesenteric arteries. Marginal fibers of the palpebral part of the orbicularis oculi muscle are known as "Riolan's muscle" – also histologically referred to as the "Grey Line."

Riolan is remembered for his traditional views towards medicine, and was a major proponent of the teachings of Galen. He held a differing viewpoint in regards to the theory of his contemporary, William Harvey (1578–1657) on the blood's circulatory system. Riolan calculated that blood traveled through the blood vessels to the body's extremities and returned to the heart only two or three times a day. He also postulated that blood often ebbed and flowed in the veins and that it was taken in as nourishment by different parts of the body. Riolan did not believe that the heart propelled the blood, instead he proposed that the blood kept the heart in motion, analogous to a stream moving the wheel of a water mill.

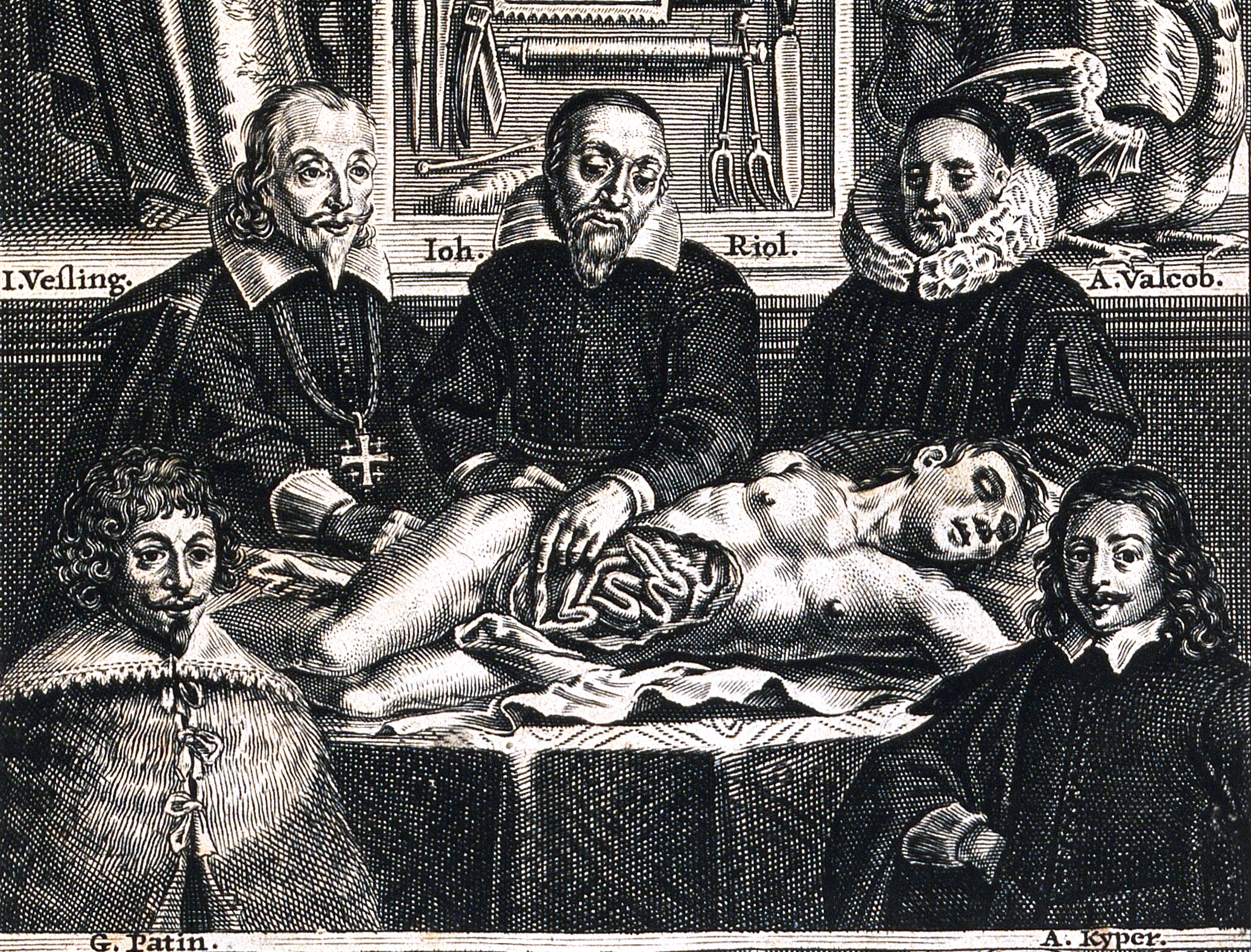
A dissection with Riolan (centre) and other physicians, Guy Patin, Johan Vesling, Albert Kyper, and A. Valkob, from an engraving, c. 1649

Riolan had other disagreements with Harvey, such as the role of the liver as a blood-manufacturing organ. Riolan was an opponent to the practice of vivisection, asserting that violent and painful deaths suffered by research animals, placed them in an unnatural condition that led to incorrect assumptions about the functionality of healthy animals.

Riolan attacked Thomas Bartholin on the question of the latter's discovery of the lymphatic system.

Riolan's best known written works are Anthropographia (1618), which is a treatise on human anatomy, and Opuscula anatomica (1649), in which he is critical of Harvey's views of the circulatory system. In his Anthropographia he also defined what traits a good anatomist had to have.
