= Morishima Chūryō =

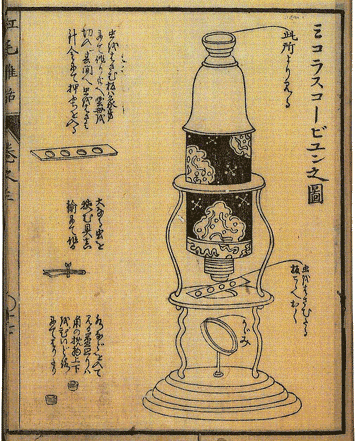
Illustration of a microscope in Chūryō's 1787 book Various Accounts from the Dutch (紅毛雑話).

Morishima Chūryō (森島 中良; 1756 – December 29, 1810) was an Edo period Japanese author of popular fiction who also wrote a number of works in the field of rangaku (Western studies). He wrote under many pen names, including Manzōtei, Shinra Manzō (or, conventionally, Shinra Banshō), and Tenjiku Rōjin ("old man from India"). The latter constituted an allusion to the pen name Tenjiku Rōnin ("masterless samurai from India"), used by Hiraga Gennai, to whom Chūryō was the principal literary successor. Chūryō co-authored several plays with Gennai early in his career, and went on to write in almost all of the many genres of popular fiction that were collectively known as gesaku. He also wrote kyōka, or comic waka poetry, under the pen name Taketsue no Sugaru. Chūryō was the younger brother of Katsuragawa Hoshū, a shogunal physician and leading scholar of rangaku.
