= Taro Morishima =

Japanese mathematician

Taro Morishima (森嶋 太郎, Morishima Tarō; 1903 – 1989) was a Japanese mathematician specializing in algebra who attended University of Tokyo in Japan. Morishima published at least thirteen papers, including his work on Fermat's Last Theorem. and a collected works volume published in 1990 after his death. He also corresponded several times with American mathematician H. S. Vandiver.

== Morishima's Theorem on FLT ==
Let m be a prime number not exceeding 31. Let p be prime, and let x, y, z be integers such that x^{p} + y^{p} + z^{p} = 0. Assume that p does not divide the product xyz. Then, p² must divide m^{p − 1}-1.

== Review ==
Granville wrote that Morishima's proof could not be accepted.
