= Hiraga Gennai =

Japanese polymath and rōnin (c.1729–c.1780)

- 平賀 源内
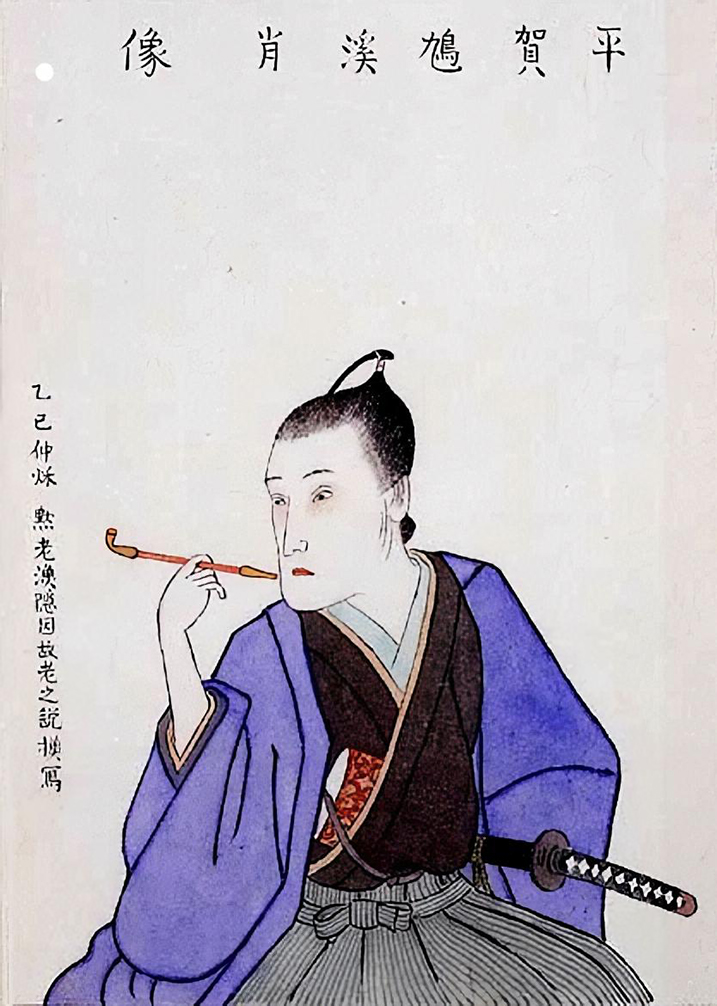
- 1845 A Portrait of Kyūkei Hiraga (1729–80) by Momuō Kimura
- Born: c.1729 Sanuki, Sanuki Province, Japan
- Other names: Kyūkei (鳩渓), Fūrai Sanjin (風来山人), Tenjiku rōnin (天竺浪人) and Fukuchi Kigai (福内鬼外)
- Education: Student of Rangaku
- Occupations: author, painter and inventor

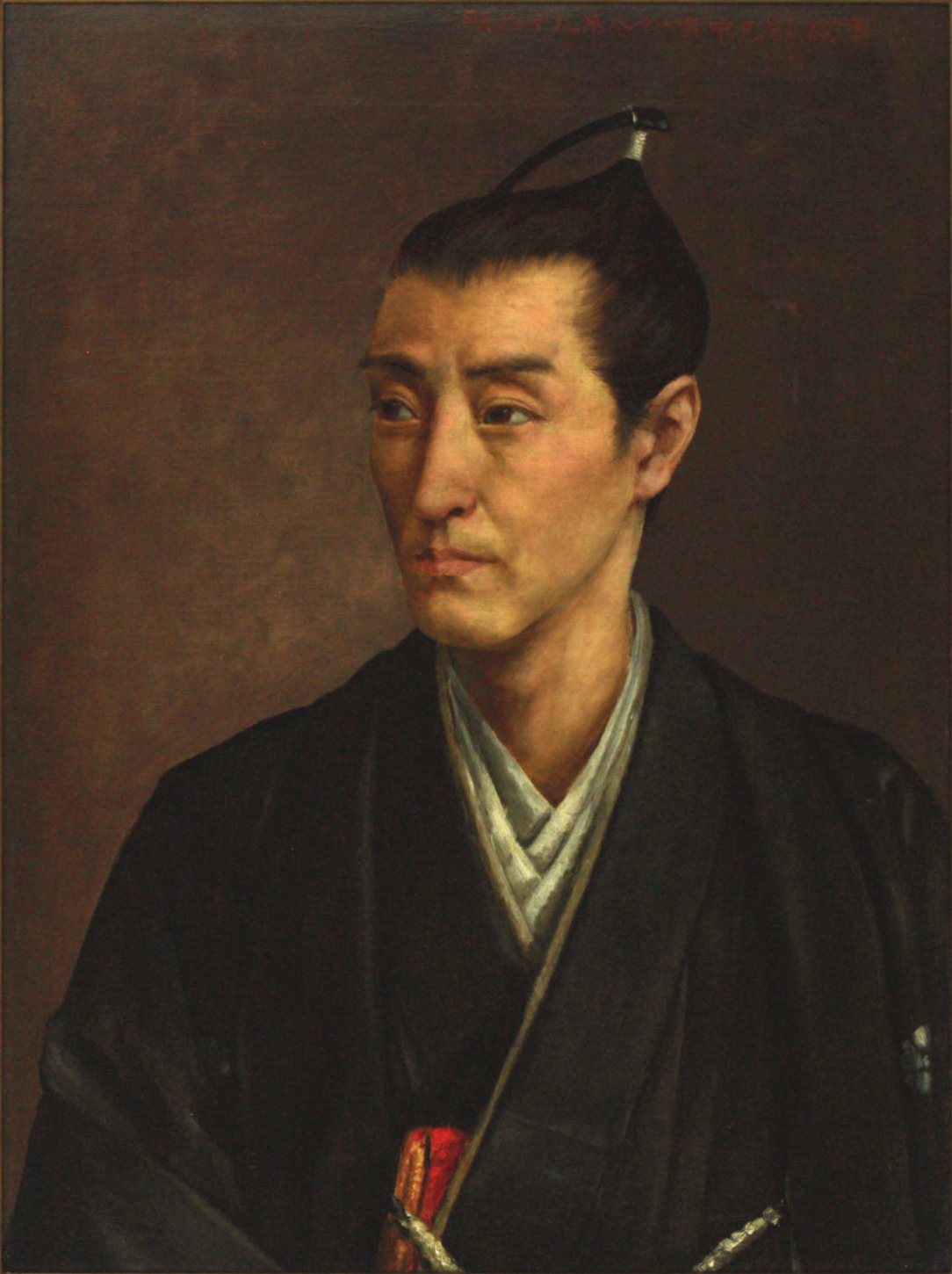
Portrait of Hiraga Gennai by Nakamaru Seijuro

Hiraga Gennai (平賀 源内; born c.1729; died 1779 or 1780) was a Japanese polymath and rōnin of the Edo period. He was a pharmacologist, student of Rangaku, author, painter and inventor well known for his Erekiteru (electrostatic generator), Kandankei (thermometer) and Kakanpu (asbestos cloth). Gennai composed several works of literature, including the fictional satires Fūryū Shidōken den (1763), the Nenashigusa (1763), and the Nenashigusa kohen (1768), and the satirical essays On Farting and A Lousy Journey of Love. He also authored two guidebooks on the male prostitutes of Japan, the Kiku no en (1764) and the San no asa (1768). His birth name was Shiraishi Kunitomo, but he later used numerous pen names, including Kyūkei (鳩渓), Fūrai Sanjin (風来山人) (his principal literary pen name), Tenjiku rōnin (天竺浪人) and Fukuchi Kigai (福内鬼外). He is best known by the name Hiraga Gennai.

== Biography ==
=== Family history ===
Hiraga Gennai was born in 1729 in the village of Shidoura, Sanuki Province (part of the modern city of Sanuki, Kagawa). He was the third son of Shiroishi Mozaemon, a low-level provincial samurai in the service of the Takamatsu Domain. The Shiroishi clan traced their roots to Saku District in Shinano Province where they were local warlords with the surname of "Hiraga". However, after they were defeated by the Takeda clan, they fled to Mutsu Province and entered the service of the Date clan, taking the new surname of "Shiroishi" from a location in Mutsu. They accompanied a cadet branch of the Date clan to Uwajima Domain in Shikoku, but eventually moved to Takamatsu where they supplemented their meagre income as a low-ranking samurai with farming. Gennai studied Confucianism and haiku poetry, and crafted kakejiku as a child in Takamatsu.

=== Early life ===
In 1741, Gennai began his studies as an herbalist and became an apprentice to a physician at the age of 12. Later at the age of 18 Gennai was offered an official position in the herb garden of the local Daimyō (大名, daimyō). In 1748, his father died, and he became head of the family.

=== Midlife ===
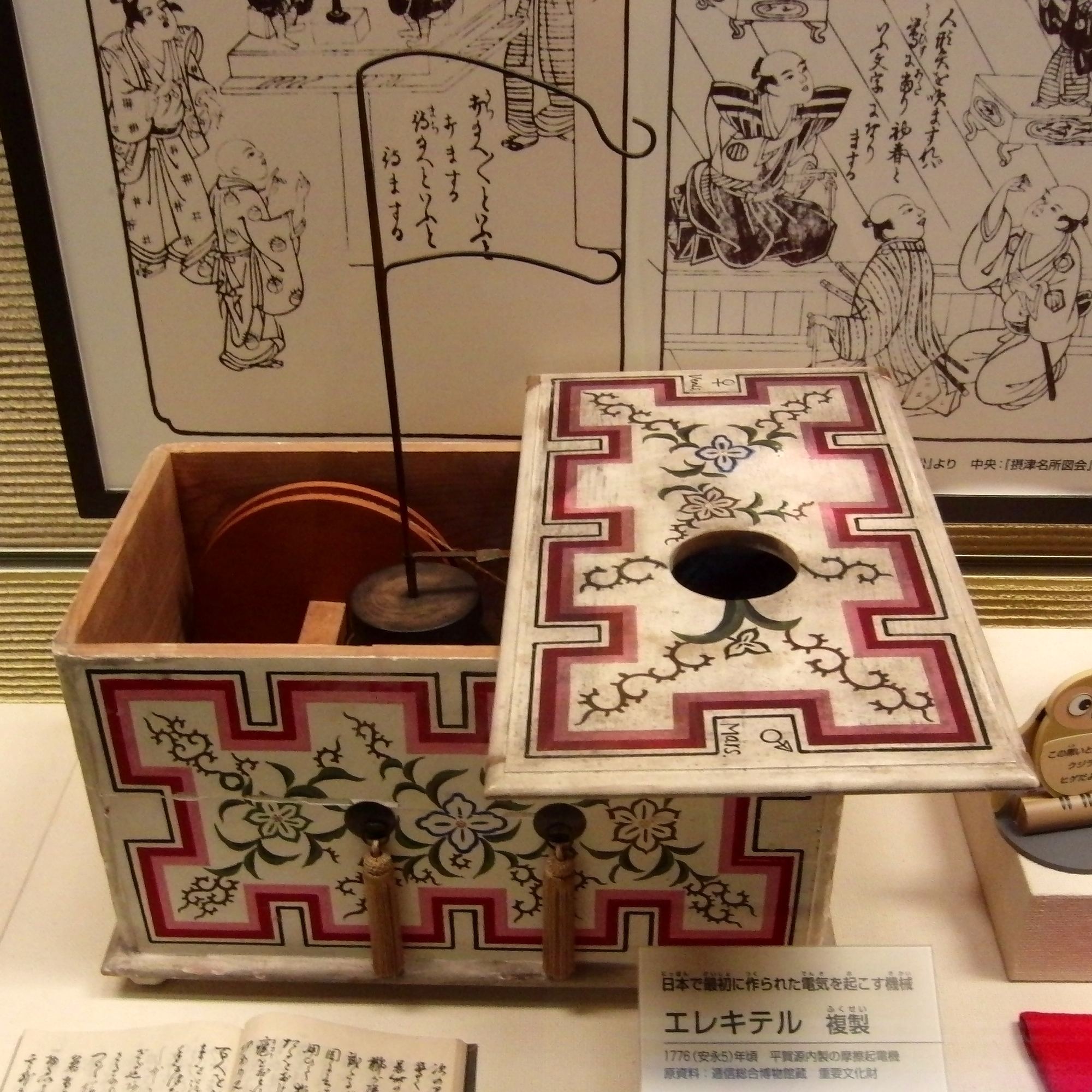
The Elekiter (replica) exhibited in the National Museum of Nature and Science, Tokyo, Japan.

==== Life in Nagasaki ====
In 1752, Gennai was sent to Nagasaki to study western medicine, including European pharmaceutical and surgical techniques and other rangaku topics. Two years later, he turned his house over to his younger sister's husband. Nagasaki was at the time one of the only ports that foreign ships were allowed to enter and therefore the Dutch East Indies Company (VOC) along with a host of Chinese traders resided in the port town, and there were able to do business under highly regulated supervision. The interaction that Gennai had with the Chinese merchants and members of the VOC introduced him to ceramics. The following year Gennai relocated to Osaka and Kyoto, where he studied herbal medicine under Toda Kyokuzan before moving to Edo in 1757.

==== Life in Edo ====
In Edo, he studied with Tamura Ransui, and with his oversight and support Gennai began to cultivate natural specimens of ginseng. This made the transition from imports of the medicinal herb to domestic production possible. While in Edo Gennai wrote a number of books, some on scientific or nature topics, some satirical novels, in the kokkeibon and dangibon genres. Gennai was an onna-girai and composed several works on the subject, including guidebooks on the male prostitutes of Edo and works of fiction exalting sex between men over heterosexuality.In his scientific experiments, Gennai prospected for various minerals, wove asbestos, calculated temperatures, and worked with static electricity. His 'Elekiteru' device (sometimes spelled as Elekiter based on the original Dutch spelling) has been recognized as IEEE Milestone (Milestones:Elekiteru: First Electrostatic Generator in Japan, 1776 ) He returned to Nagasaki to study mining and the techniques of refining ores.

===== Mining =====
In 1761, he discovered iron deposits in Izu Province and worked as a broker to establish a mining venture. He also held exhibitions of his various inventions in Edo, and came to be known to Tanuma Okitsugu, a senior official in the Tokugawa shogunate, as well as the doctors Sugita Genpaku and Nakagawa Jun'an. In 1766, he assisted Kawagoe Domain to develop an asbestos mine in what is now part of Chichibu, Saitama. While these, he also studied techniques to improve the efficiency of charcoal furnaces and the construction of river boats.

===== Pottery =====
In 1772, while on a trip to Nagasaki, Gennai uncovered a store of clay; this led to him petitioning the government to allow him to manufacture pottery on a large scale, for both exports and domestic use.

He is quoted as having said:

If the Japanese ware is good, then naturally we will not spend our gold and silver on the foreign commodity. Rather to the contrary: since both the Chinese and Hollanders will come to seek out these wares and carry them home, this will be of everlasting national benefit. Since it is originally clay, no matter how much pottery we send out, there need be no anxiety about a depletion of resources.

— Hiraga Gennai

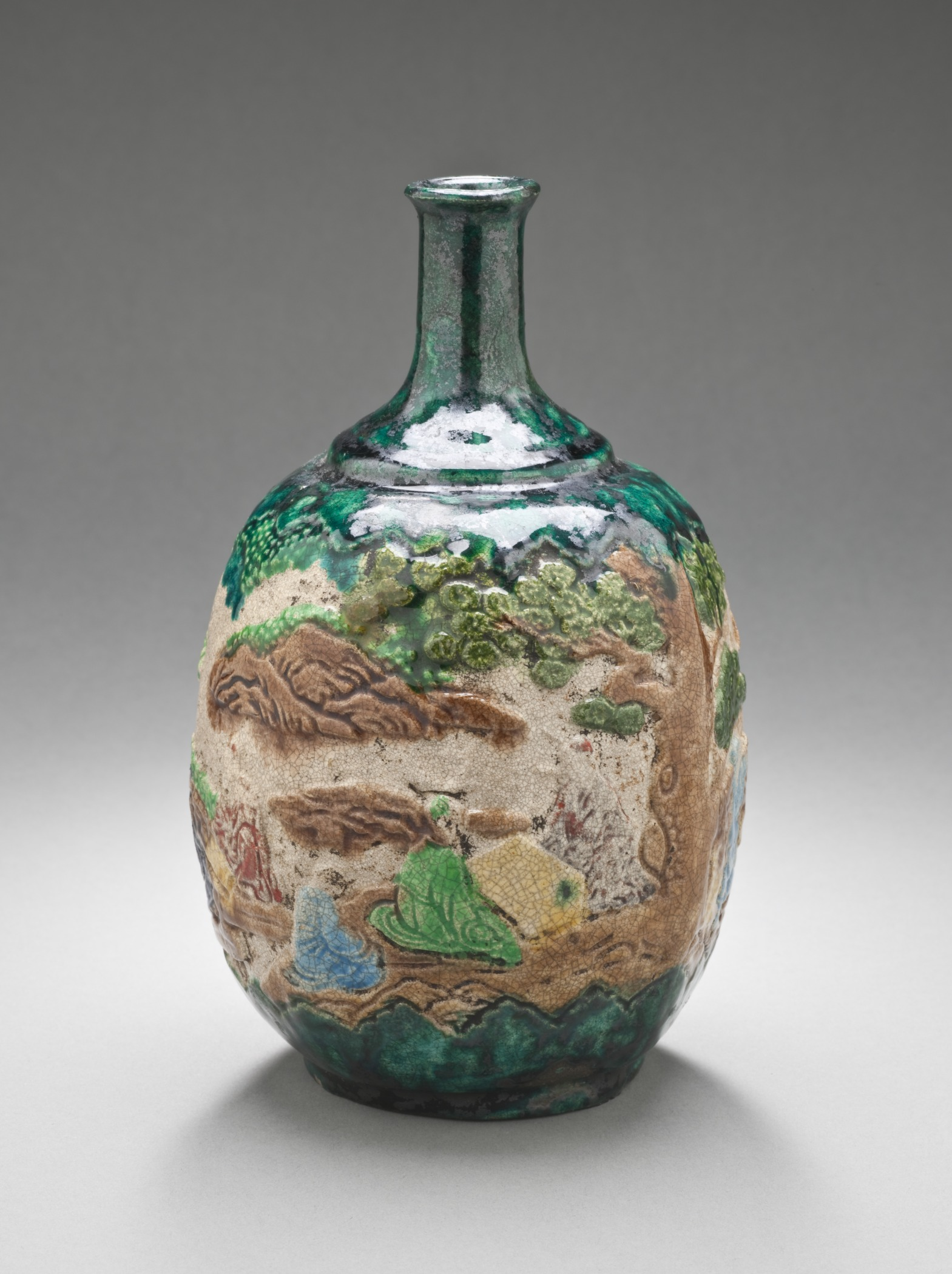
Gennai (Shido) ware sake bottle with design of scholars in garden, earthenware with clear glaze and colored enamels. Edo period, 18th century

Gennai made or instructed a number of Japanese pottery pieces which are named Gennai ware after him. The style is unique with brilliant colours, mostly three, following the Kōchi ware style from Gennai's native island of Shikoku.

===== Teaching =====
In 1773, he was invited by Satake Yoshiatsu to Kubota Domain to teach mining engineering, and while in Dewa Province, also gave lessons in western oil painting.

=== End of life ===
Gennai was back in Edo by the summer of 1779, where he undertook repairs to a Daimyō mansion. His final days are surrounded in mystery. The most prevalent account is that he was arrested in late 1779 for killing two carpenters on the project in a drunken rage after they had accused him of stealing the plans for the mansion. He subsequently died of tetanus in prison on January 24 of the following year. Sugita Genpaku wanted to hold a funeral service, but this was denied for unknown reasons by the Shogunate, so Sugita held a memorial service with no body and with no tombstone. This has given rise to many theories over the years that Gennai had not actually died in prison, but had been spirited away, possibly by the intervention of Tanuma Okitsugu, and lived out the rest of his life somewhere in obscurity.

== Grave of Hiraga Gennai ==
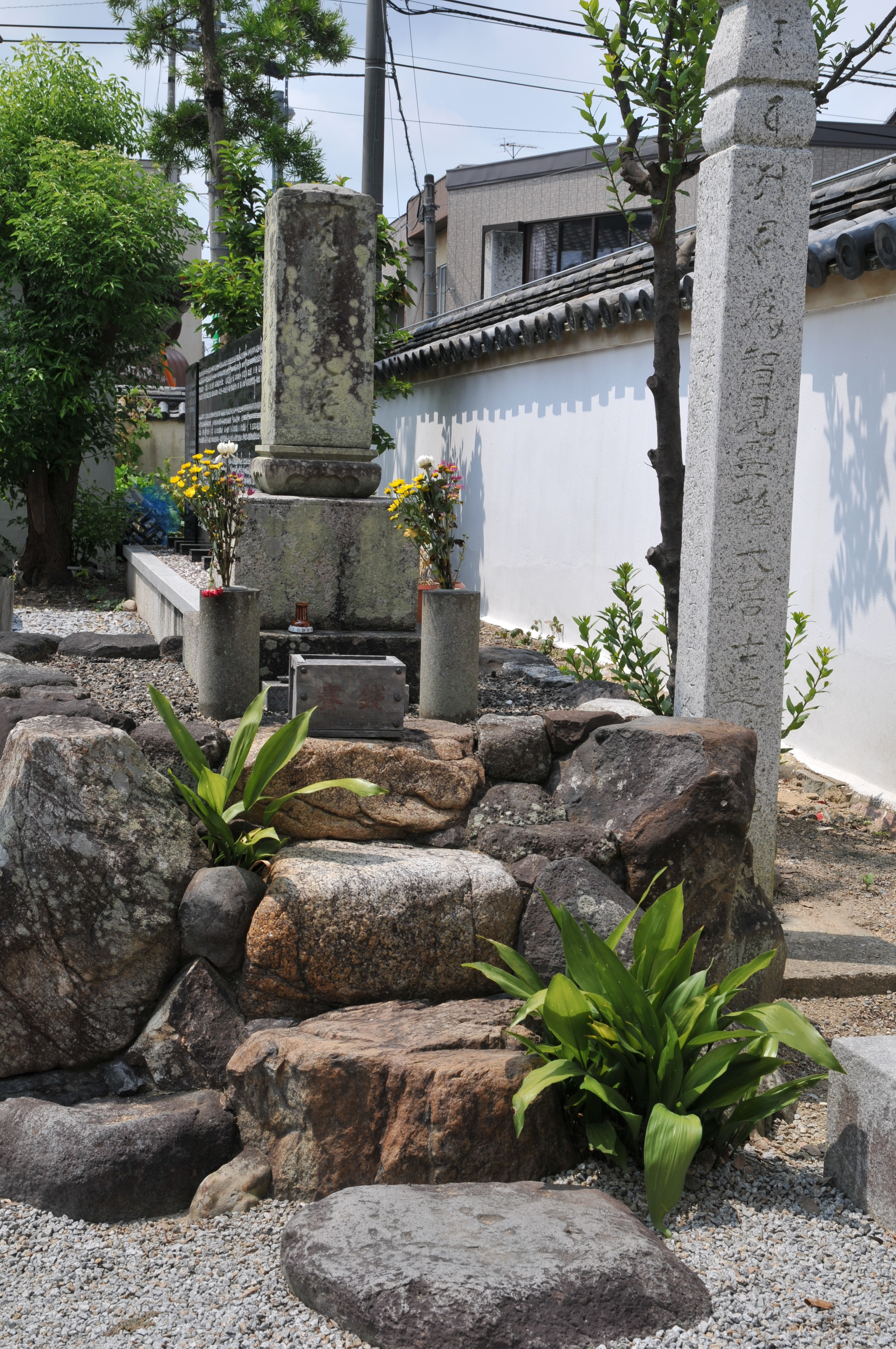
Hiraga Gennai grave in Shido

Despite the original prohibition on his funeral, Hiraga Gennai had a grave at the temple of Sosen-ji in Asakusabashi (currently Hashiba, Taitō-ku, Tokyo) 35°43′41″N 139°48′21″E. In 1928, following the 1923 Great Kantō earthquake, the temple was relocated to Itabashi, but its cemetery remained behind. Behind his grave is the grave of Fukusuke, his long-time manservant, and next to the tombstone is a stone monument with an epitaph by Sugita Genpaku, his life-long friend. The tomb was reconstructed by Count Yorinaga Matsudaira in 1931. It received protection as a National Historic Site in 1943. The site is a 12-minute walk from Minami-Senju Station on the Hibiya Line; however, the grave is not open to the public.

In addition, Hiraga has a second grave at the Hiraga family bodaiji in Sanuki, Kagawa.

== Works ==
=== On Farting ===
Gennai published many works over the course of his literary career. Perhaps one of the most well-known is On Farting, a satirical work which explored encounters between high and low culture in Ryōgoku, a popular entertainment district in Edo. Within this work, Gennai himself is depicted as having a "spirited" debate with a samurai about a peasant who had gained fame and popularity as a fart-ist, entertaining crowds with performances of flatulence. Gennai and his friends debate if a drug is being used by the artist that allows the performance to be possible. Gennai argues that the feat is impressive and commendably unique. Another character, a Confucian Samurai named Ishibe Kinkichirō, argues that, due to the rudeness of the act and the stupidity of viewers, encouraging the public performance of flatulence goes against the rules of Confucian etiquette. Through this extended dialogue, Gennai highlights the differences between these two conflicting value systems. For the Confucian samurai, the performance represents a serious offence against propriety and social order, whereas Gennai believes that it embodies wisdom and creativity. The two agree that a fart is nothing more than a useless discharge, and that it cannot compare to the officially sanctioned work traditionally labeled as 'productive', such as the mental work that comes with running Tokugawa society; however, they disagree on the meaning and implications of this discharge. Kinkichirō argues that it goes against everything that the "true sages" taught society about human decency and etiquette, but Gennai sees the fart-ist's creativity and wisdom in being able to make such useless excess into music. By presenting it this way Gennai exposes a problem with the categorization of material and media as either high or low. Throughout the story, Gennai continues to critique both the concept of high culture and the attitude of its custodians.

=== Rootless Grass ===
Another of Gennai's notable satirical works is Rootless Grass, in which Enma, the King of Hell, falls in love with an onnagata. In Gennai's description of hell, it is a lively place, but is currently in the midst of a large construction project. This project is due to the need for more space, because of the massive growth in population that hell is experiencing. King Enma tasks the Dragon King with the retrieval of the onnagata Kinkunojō II, who has become the object of Enma's affection. The Dragon King holds court to determine who will go to the mortal world to retrieve the onnagata. The court debates over which retainer should be the one to complete this task. In the end, the Dragon King sends the gatekeeper, a kappa. The kappa plans to seduce the actor and then drown him, in order to bring him back to hell. However, the kappa falls in love with the young actor. Not wanting to subject his lover to eternal suffering in hell, the kappa brings back a less attractive onnagata in an unsuccessful attempt to appease Enma. Enma then ventures out into the mortal realm to find Kinkunojō himself, but he is defeated in battle by the great hero actor Ichikawa Raizō I. It is then revealed that the whole story has actually been Raizō's dream, foretelling his imminent death.

=== A Lousy Journey of Love ===
Continuing the theme of satirical publications, Gennai's piece "A Lousy Journey of Love" is part of Blown Blossom and Fallen Leaves, an anthology of his work compiled and published posthumously by his friend and trainee, Ōta Nanpo. Within this piece, the reader follows the journey of two lice traversing the body of a boy. Gennai employs frequent wordplay and puns, which add to the absurdity and humor of telling a story from the perspective of a louse.

== Appearances in fiction ==
- Hiraga Gennai (1989, TBS, as Gennai: Toshiyuki Nishida)

In the film, Gennai is the protagonist of a detective-like role who uses his wealth of knowledge to solve the mystery of the incident that occurred in Edo.

- Gennai appears as a scholar/inventor and cross-dressing lesbian in the manga Ōoku: The Inner Chambers (2005–2020) by Fumi Yoshinaga.
- In the anime OVA: Mask of Zeguy Hiraga Gennai had a prominent role (along with Hijikata Toshizo) in protecting Miki (who is a descendant of the renowned Priestess Shamus) and preventing the legendary mask from falling into the wrong hands.
- In the anime OVA: T.P. Sakura, Hiraga Gennai appears in addition to his elekiter.
- In the anime Oh! Edo Rocket episode 10 it is revealed that the retired resident is Gennai. The Fūrai Row-House Block, which he says is his, is also likely a nod to one of his pen names.
- In the anime Gintama, there is a mechanic known as Hiraga Gengai.
- The anime Zero no Tsukaima has a character by the name of Hiraga Saito. Since Saito hails from Japan, it is speculated that he is named after Gennai.
- Gennai makes an appearance in the anime Read or Die, along with the clones of many other historical and legendary figures. In Read Or Die, Gennai uses his elekiter as a very high powered destructive weapon that he uses to destroy the White House and eradicate an entire fleet of combat helicopters.
- A giant mechanical frog is named after him in Mai-HiME.
- In the anime Flint the Time Detective, he makes an appearance with the Time Shifter Elekin as he uses it to make giant robots.
- In the Square game Live-A-Live, there is a mechanic named Gennai who is responsible for the creation of mechanical traps in the Bakumatsu Chapter. Since the setting of the chapter is the Bakumatsu era, his presence is an anachronism, but considering the additional presence of Ishikawa Goemon, Yodo-Dono, and Shiro Tokisada Amakusa, it is clear that this section of the game was intentionally designed as a mash-up of popular Japanese history.
- In the 36th episode of Kikaida 01 Hiraga Gennai is threatened by time traveling robots from 1974 disguised as ninja. The evil Shadow tends to take him to 1974 and have him help build better robots.
- In the 30th episode of Demashita! Powerpuff Girls Z (ガールズとカレ!, "Girls and Him!"), a character by the name of Hiraga Kennai is responsible for the creation of a primitive form of Chemical Z and the Ōedo Chakichaki Musume. He also uses an elekiter to separate Him's soul (the black light) from his body.
- In the 13th episode of the first season of the anime Digimon Adventure (エンジェモン覚醒!, "Angemon's Awakening!"), an elderly man named Gennai appears to the Chosen Children/Digidestined and helps them with their journey. He reappears in the second season called Digimon Adventure 02 as a younger man. His Digimon Adventure design appears to be based on old-fashioned Japanese styles, and both it and his name were likely inspired by the historical Gennai.
- In the light novel Hidan no Aria, Gennai is the famous ancestor of the Amdo Butei Aya Hiraga.
- In the 6th episode of the anime Sengoku Collection he is embodied in a genius and clumsy girl.
- In the anime Carried by the Wind: Tsukikage Ran, Gennai makes an appearance in episode 7.
- In the manga Korokoro Soushi, by Shintaro Kago, as a recurrent character.
- Takashi Yamaguchi played Hiraga Gennai in Tenkagomen, an NHK drama series (1971–1972).
- In a mobile card turn-based video game Valkyrie Crusade, a female version of Hiraga exists as a card. Elekiter also mentioned with "her".
- In the free-to-play MMORPG Onigiri, there is a female version of Hiraga Gennai. She is part of the main quest line story. As a special partner character, players can also control her using the 'Vanguard Swap' feature.
- In the web series Critical Role, in the Call of Cthulhu RPG one-shot, Gennai is a member of a secret society that wishes to cast light in every corner of the world, in order to starve The Village of the Hungry Night. Dr. Ida Codswell uses Gennai's elekiter to momentarily turn on the lights of The Crystal Palace to keep off The Village of the Hungry Night.
- In the season 3, episode 9 of Star Trek: Discovery Terra Firma 1, a starship named USS Hiraga Gennai is mentioned as answering a distress call.
