= Nakagawa Jun'an =

Japanese physician and botanist (1739–1786)

Nakagawa Jun'an (中川 淳庵; 1739 – 2 July 1786) was a Japanese medical doctor, botanist, and scholar of rangaku (Western learning). He was a junior colleague of Sugita Genpaku, with whom he studied and worked in Obama Domain, Wakasa Province, a center for Western medicine in Edo period Japan. Along with Sugita and Maeno Ryōtaku (前野 良沢), Nakagawa prepared Kaitai Shinsho, a translation of the Dutch "New Book of Anatomy." Nakagawa was very active in circles of rangaku scholars, and is said to have played an important role in the field's progression and advancement.

== Life ==
Not much is known about Nakagawa's early life, but his grandfather is believed to have also been a rangaku scholar in Obama. Nakagawa grew up in the Kōjimachi area of Edo (modern-day Tokyo), and studied botany under Tamura Ransui (田村 藍水). He developed a strong interest in Dutch products, science and culture, and visited the Dutch trading post at Dejima, Nagasaki a number of times, where he also studied the Dutch language.

During his time as Tamura's pupil, Nakagawa became quite involved in the rangaku community. He helped revise some of Hiraga Gennai's works, including a taxonomic work called Butsurui Hinshitsu. He also helped in the development of such technologies as fire-resistant cloth and thermometers.

Nakagawa began corresponding with Carl Peter Thunberg in 1776. He met and studied with the Swedish botanist that same year in Edo, exploring the fields of natural history and learning how to take and analyze plant and mineral samples.

Nakagawa died in 1786, possibly from stomach cancer.
