= Johann Vesling =

German anatomist and botanist

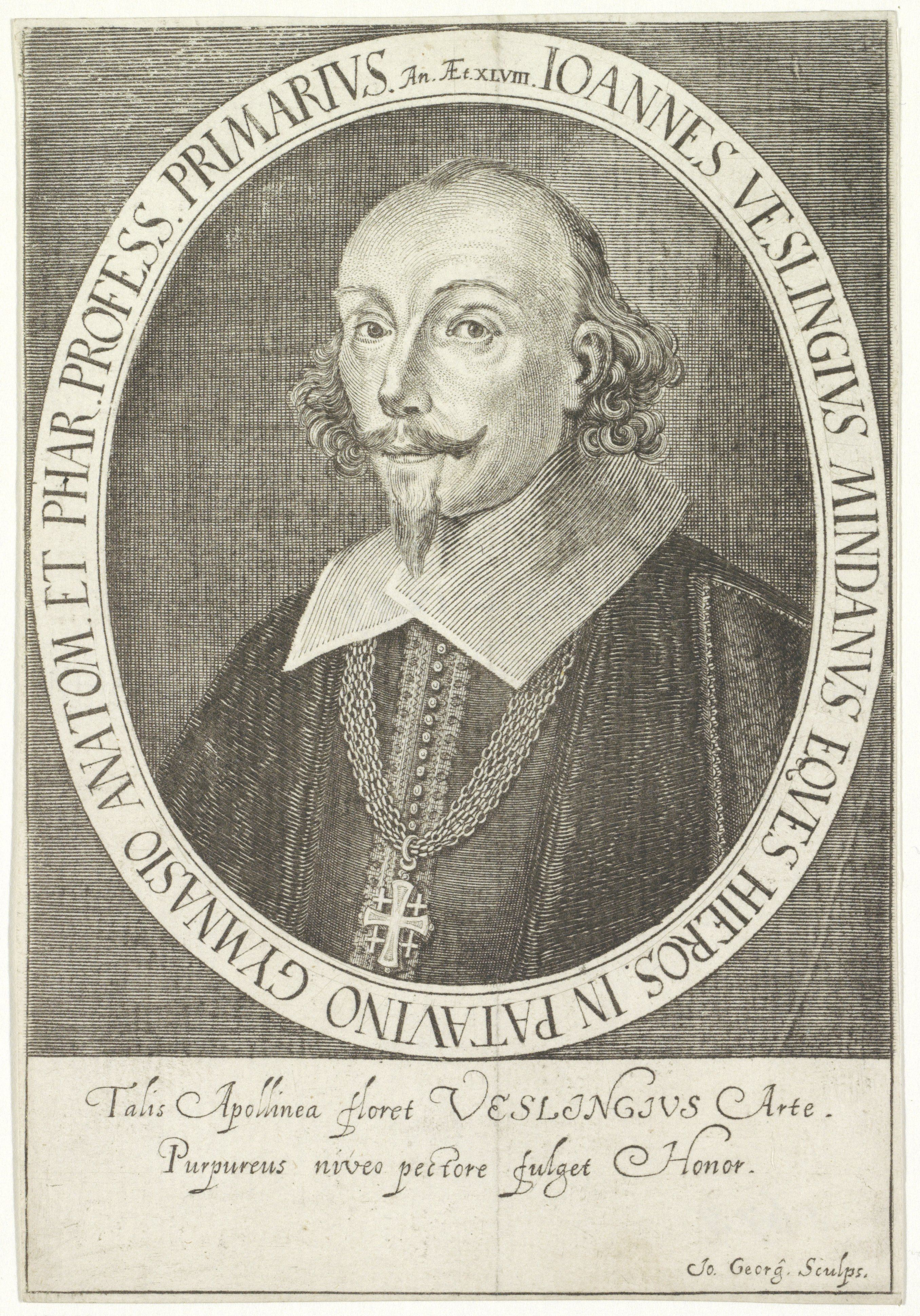
Vesling, c. 1649

Johann Vesling (Latin: Veslingius; 1598 – 30 August 1649) was a German anatomist and botanist from Minden, Westphalia. He published a major illustrated work on human anatomy Syntagma Anatomicum (1641).

== Life and work ==
Illustration from Syntagma anatomicum

Vesling was born in Minden, Westphalia. His Catholic family fled to Vienna to escape religious persecution. It is thought that he studied at the University of Leiden from 1619. He trained in botany and medicine but he received a degree from the University of Venice. In 1628 he was applied as an "Incisor" at the medical college in Venice. In the same year he traveled to Egypt and Jerusalem, where he was the personal physician of the Venice consul, and also conducted extensive studies of regional flora (particularly medicinal plants). In 1632 he became professor of anatomy and surgery at Padua, where he was an instructor to Thomas Bartholin. His popularity however was the cause of his downfall. Later in his career, he succeeded Prospero Alpini (died 1616) as director of the botanical garden at the University of Padua. He was made a physician to statesman Alvise Cornaro and accompanied Cornaro to Cairo in 1628. In Egypt he began to conduct botanical studies which led in 1640 to the publication of an annotated edition of De plantis Aegypti first published by Prospero Alpini in 1592, and a work on balsam published in 1644. Veslingius returned to Padua in 1633.

Vesling dissecting a human body

Vesling is best remembered for the 1641 publication of Syntagma anatomicum, publicis dissectionibus, in auditorum usum, diligenter aptatum, a popular textbook based on his anatomical dissections in Padua. In this work he provided an early discussion of the human lymphatic system, and included the earliest sketches of the lacteals in humans. Vesling also performed important studies of blood circulation, and was one of the first physicians to describe the brain's circle of Willis.

Vesling's work influenced the Japanese physician Touyou Yamawaki (1705-1762) and the English scientist John Evelyn.
