= Sugita Genpaku =

Japanese physician and scholar (1733–1817)

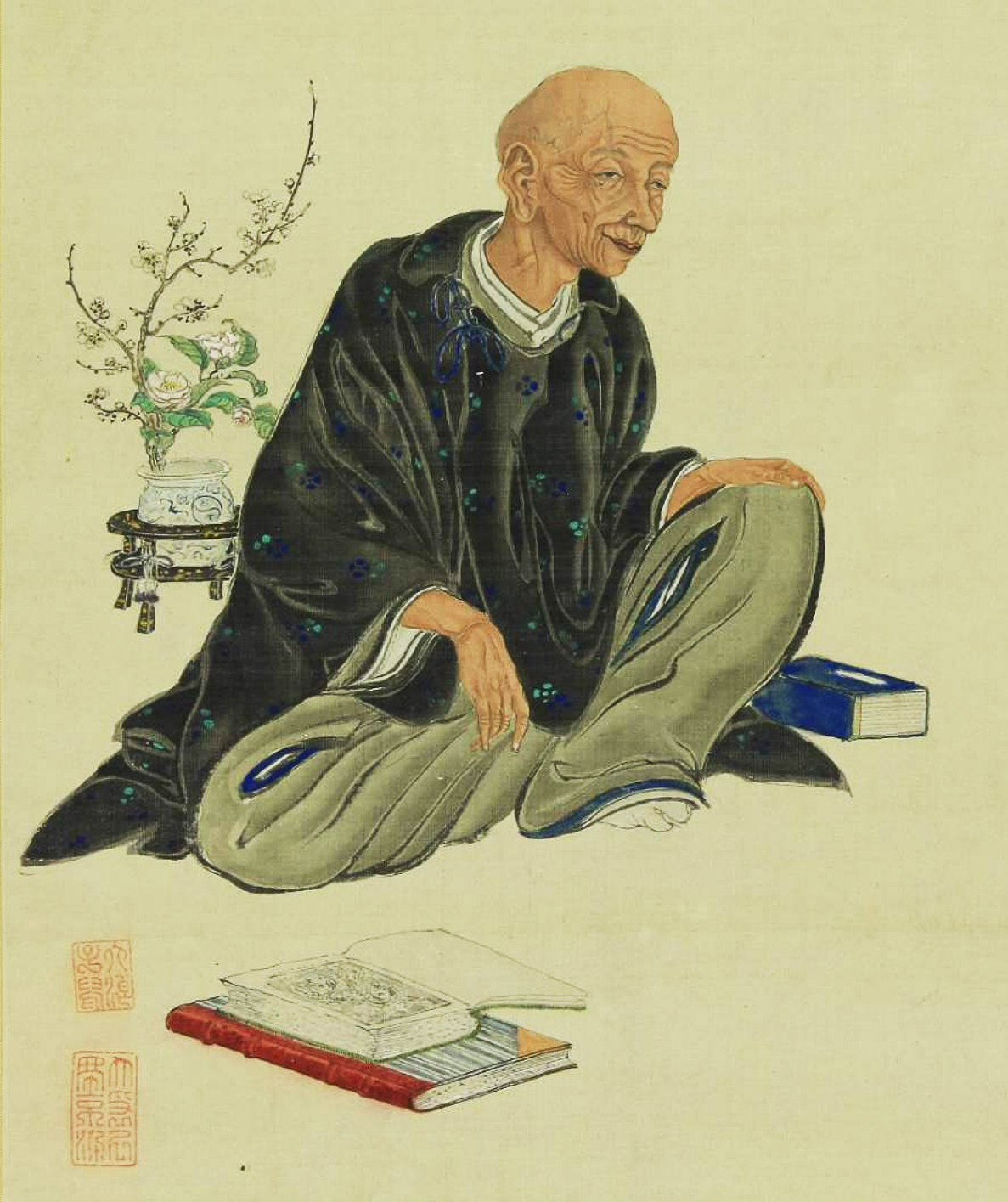
- Sugita Genpaku
- Born: 13 September 1733; Yarai, Ushigome, Edo Japan
- Died: 17 April 1817 (aged 83)
- Occupations: Physician, Writer
- Writing career
- Notable works: Kaitai Shinsho; Rangaku

Sugita Genpaku (杉田 玄白; 20 October 1733 – 1 June 1817) was a Japanese physician and scholar known for his translation of Kaitai Shinsho (New Book of Anatomy) and a founder of Rangaku (Western learning) and Ranpō (Dutch style medicine) in Japan. He was one of the first Japanese scholars in Edo (modern day Tokyo) to study the Dutch language and is credited with being one of the first Japanese physicians to study Western medical teachings in Japan.

In 1771 Genpaku and Maeno Ryōtaku, a Japanese scholar studying the Dutch language, translated a Dutch book of anatomy Ontleedkundige Tafelen, originally published in German by physician and professor Johann Adam Kulmus in 1734. Genpaku was inspired to translate the Dutch text after witnessing the dissection of a female criminal while viewing Ontleedkundige Tafelen as an anatomical reference throughout the dissection. He was inspired by the German drawings of human organs, which accurately depicted the organs and vasculature he saw during the dissection. The German drawings were more anatomically detailed and accurate than Chinese texts and after the dissection he and his colleagues made it their scholarly mission to produce a Japanese translation of the Ontleedkundige Tafelen. It took three full years and eleven manuscripts to produce the first translation of the text entitled Kaitai Shinsho in 1774.

== Early life ==
Born in the Wakasa-Obama estate of Feudal Lord Wakasa in 1733, Genpaku was the son of a physician, Hosen Sugita, who was the official doctor of Feudal Lord Wakasa. Genpaku's mother, daughter of Genkō Yomogida, died during childbirth. Around age 17, Genpaku began studying surgery under Gentetsu Nishi. He also studied Confucianism under Saburoemon Miyase. Genpaku moved away from his father's home at age 25 after being granted permission from his liege lord to begin working as a medical practitioner. His first business was located at 4-chōme, Nihonbashidōri and was attached to the home of painter Sekkei Kusumoto.

== Career ==
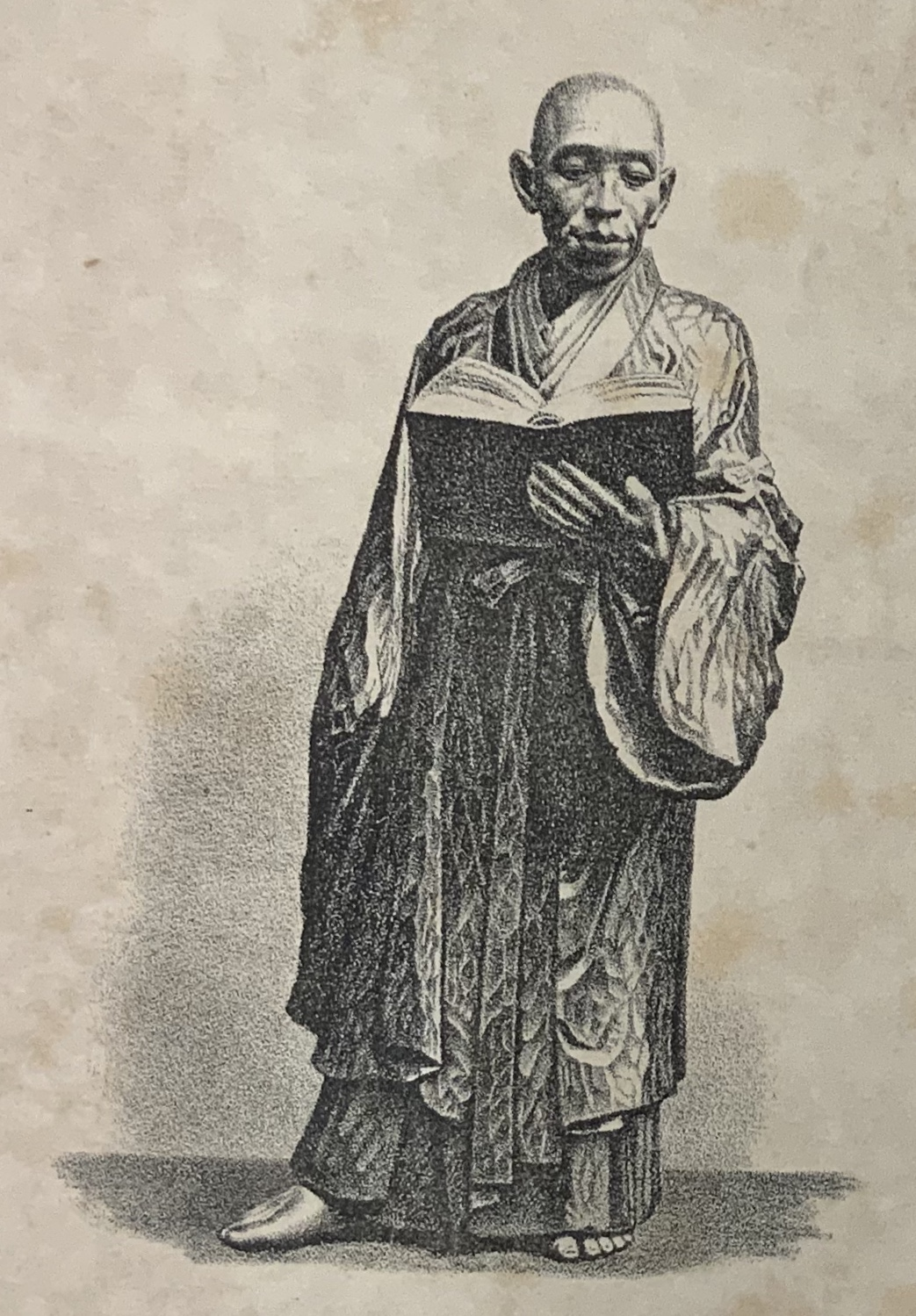
Drawing of Sugita Genpaku

Genpaku was forced to relocate his medical practice from Nihonbashidōri-dōri to Hakoya-chō in 1759 and later to Horidome-chō in 1762, both due to losing his property from fires. He later left Horidome-chō and moved to property owned by Feudal Lord Sakai around 1770.

Under the rule of the Tokogawa shoguns, Genpaku lived in a period Japanese isolation from the Western world and most of East Asia. The period of isolation, sakoku, was driven by the shogun's desire to halt the spread of Christianity propagated largely by Portuguese missionaries. During this period, Nagasaki was the only port of entry and only Holland was allowed to enter Japan, as their transactions were understood to be exclusively pertaining to trade. In the early eighteenth century, Western texts were severely restricted in Japan and Western knowledge predominately spread orally, mediated through translators whose grasp of Japanese was limited. As relations evolved with the Dutch, the eighth shogun, Tokugawa Yoshimune (ruled 1716–45), allowed Rangaku (Western learning) to take hold in Japan. Yoshimune launched efforts to systematically study Dutch in 1740, giving rise to the scholarly pursuit of rangaku, however this learning was still restricted from the general public. In many cases by the police who were known to destroy Dutch texts. In mid eighteenth century, Dutch books became sought after as scholarly texts by the Japanese, and it was during this time that Genpaku came into the medical profession.

With the acceptance of rangaku, Dutch physicians presented lectures and demonstrations to the Shōgun in Edo. Genpaku attended one such demonstration in 1768 where a Dutch surgeon, Rudolf Bauer, cured a patient with gangrene of the tongue by drawing blood from the infected area.

As a practicing physician and scholar of surgery, Genpaku was aware of physician Tōyō Yamawaki's (1705–62) observations through dissection, though only through second hand information from physician Genteki Kosugi. Yamawaki first witnessed dissection of a beheaded criminal on February 7, 1754, and it is thought that his interest in witnessing dissection arose from his possession of a German anatomical text Syntagma Anatomicum. An account of Yamawaki's observations were published as Zōshi (Description of the organs), and this text is credited as the beginning of experimental anatomy in Japan. Also in possession of a Western anatomical text, Ontleedkundige Tafelen, Genpaku was interested by the opportunity to witness a dissection.

As a physician practicing during the Tokugawa shogun, Genpaku and his contemporary physicians are often referred to as "Tokugawa physicians." Collectively, these physicians shared a sentiment of radical social equality. Genpaku wrote in Keiei yawa:

Other than the differences between males and females, there are no distinctive differences between human beings, from the emperor to all commoners. Where there are no differences, then, humans themselves have artificially created above and below, and the names of the four social statuses. Yet there is no difference between us, because we are all human.

Such ideas of equality were not widely accepted in the class based Japanese society, but particularly before Western learning from Dutch travellers began to spread within scholarly communities, Japanese physicians already have a belief in nature as the foundation for truth and the body as an extension of nature. Tokugawa physicians expanded their regard for the body to a responsibility to protect the wellness of the body as a shared logic of nature. The introduction of Western medicine in Japan occurred without colonization efforts, which allowed the Tokugawa physicians to use Western medicine for performing humanitarian medical acts without the spread of western religions that usually comes with it.

=== Translating Ontleedkundige Tafelen ===
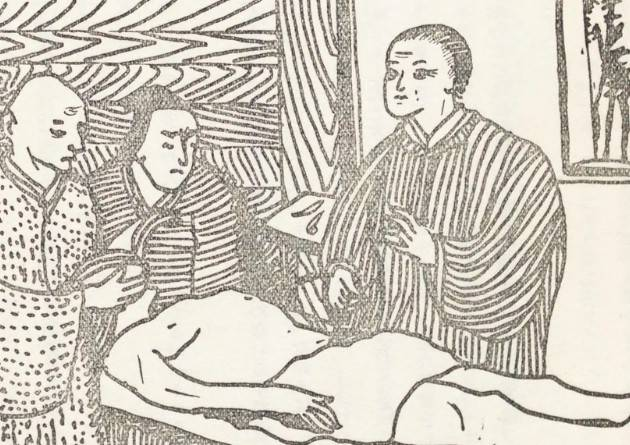
Aochababa being dissected

On March 4, 1771 Genpaku and colleagues Maeno Ryōtaku, Hoshū Katsuragawa, and Junan Nakagawa witnessed a dissection of a female criminal, Aocha-Baba ("Green Tea Hag"), who was executed by beheading. According to court records, the woman was executed for killing her large number of adopted children. Genpaku and Ryōtaku watched the dissection while referencing Ontleedkundige Tafelen and were struck by the anatomical accuracy of the text, which differed greatly from the Chinese texts and understanding of anatomy they previously held. On their walk home from the execution grounds where they witnessed the dissection, Genpaku and Ryōtaku decided to dedicate themselves to making a Japanese translation of Ontleedkundige Tafelen.

Translating Ontleedkundige Tafelen took Genpaku and Ryōtaku three full years and at least eleven manuscripts before the final product, Kaitai Shinsho, was published in 1774. With only Maeno's 600 word Dutch vocabulary to complete the translation, the first edition of Kaitai Shinsho was crude and contained errors and omissions. However, the text is still regarded as a turning point in the introduction of Western medicine in Japan.

=== Teaching Rangaku ===
Genpaku took on many students in the emerging field of Rangaku, including Gentaku Otsuki (1757–1827). Considered one of his most fastidious students in the study of Dutch, after six years of study under Genpaku, Otsuki went on to study Dutch more closely in Nagasaki. This education enabled him to become a proficient Dutch translator. Otsuki went on to rewrite the translation of Kaitai Shinsho, published in 1788, and publish an original text Yōi Shinsho (New book on surgery) in 1790. Otsuki is most recognized for his work Rangaku Kaitai (Ladder to Dutch study) published in 1788, which was a text credited with fostered Dutch and Western learning in Japan.

== Later life and legacy ==
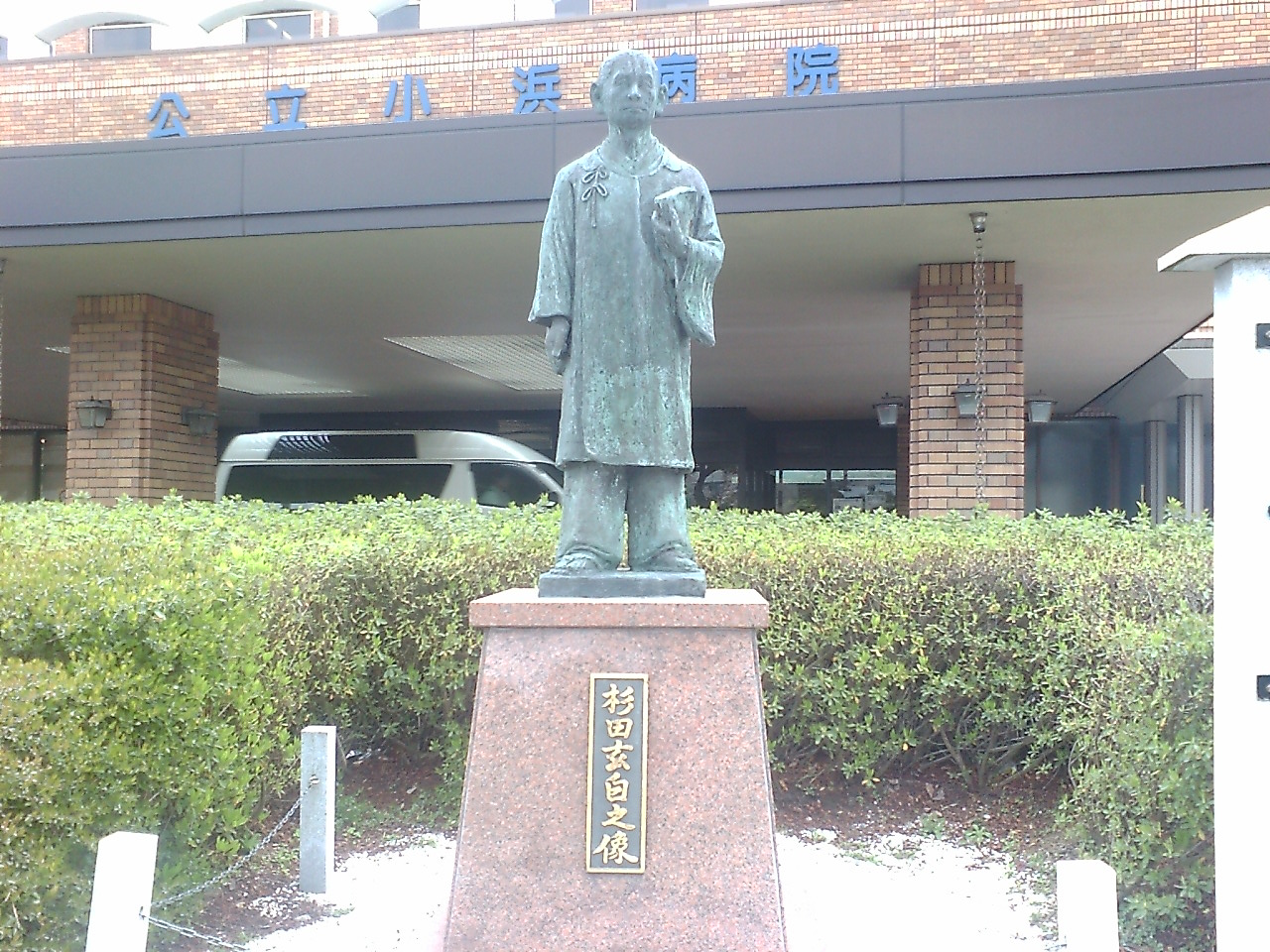
Bronze statue of Genpaku Sugita in Obama, Fukui Prefecture. It is installed in front of Sugita Genpaku Memorial Obama Municipal Hospital

Genpaku continued to collect Dutch texts and build a robust medical library. After mentoring many students in Rangaku—including Gentaku Otsuki, Shojuro Arai, and Genzui Udagawa—Genpaku began spending more time working as a physician than as a scholar towards the end of his life. One of Genpaku's last students was Genshin Udugawa, a man who came to know Genpaku through a mutual fascination in the Dutch language. At this time in his old age, Genpaku was looking to adopt a son who could succeed him in taking his home, profession, and legacy of medical service to Japan. Genpaku initially took Genshin in as a student and prospective son to inherit his estate. A young man, Genshin was temperamental and did not heed Genpaku's wishes to better his behavior. As such, Genpaku disowned Genshin. A few years passed and Genshin continued his studies of Rangaku and bettered his ambitions, eventually gaining favor of the Udagawas who were friends of Genpaku. With the change in Genshin's behavior, Genpaku re-welcomed him as a son, and left him to inherit his estate.

Above all, Genpaku's legacy is that of a teacher and physician with the goal to better the health of Japanese citizens through the knowledge of foreign nations. The path of learning Genpaku set his students on fostered a generation of scholars that would come to introduce Western medicine to Japan. In addition to his influence on Japanese medicine, Genpaku's Japanese translations of Dutch texts were translated into Chinese. These works were among the first Western medical texts in Chinese.

== Notable works ==
Although Genpaku is most well known for his translation of Ontleedkundige Tafelen, he published many other works including medical, political, and historical works.

- Yoka Taisei (A Handbook of Surgery)
- Rangaku Koto-hajime (A History of the Development of Rangaku)
- Teriakaho-San (Concerning Theriac)
- Kei-ei Yawa (Conversations with the Shadows of Men. A work on medical politics and ethics)
- Oranda Iti Mondo (Dialogues on Dutch Medicine), 1795
- Nochi-Migusa (Essays in Hindsight)
- Yojo-Schichi-Fuka (Seven Articles About Hygiene)

== Gallery ==
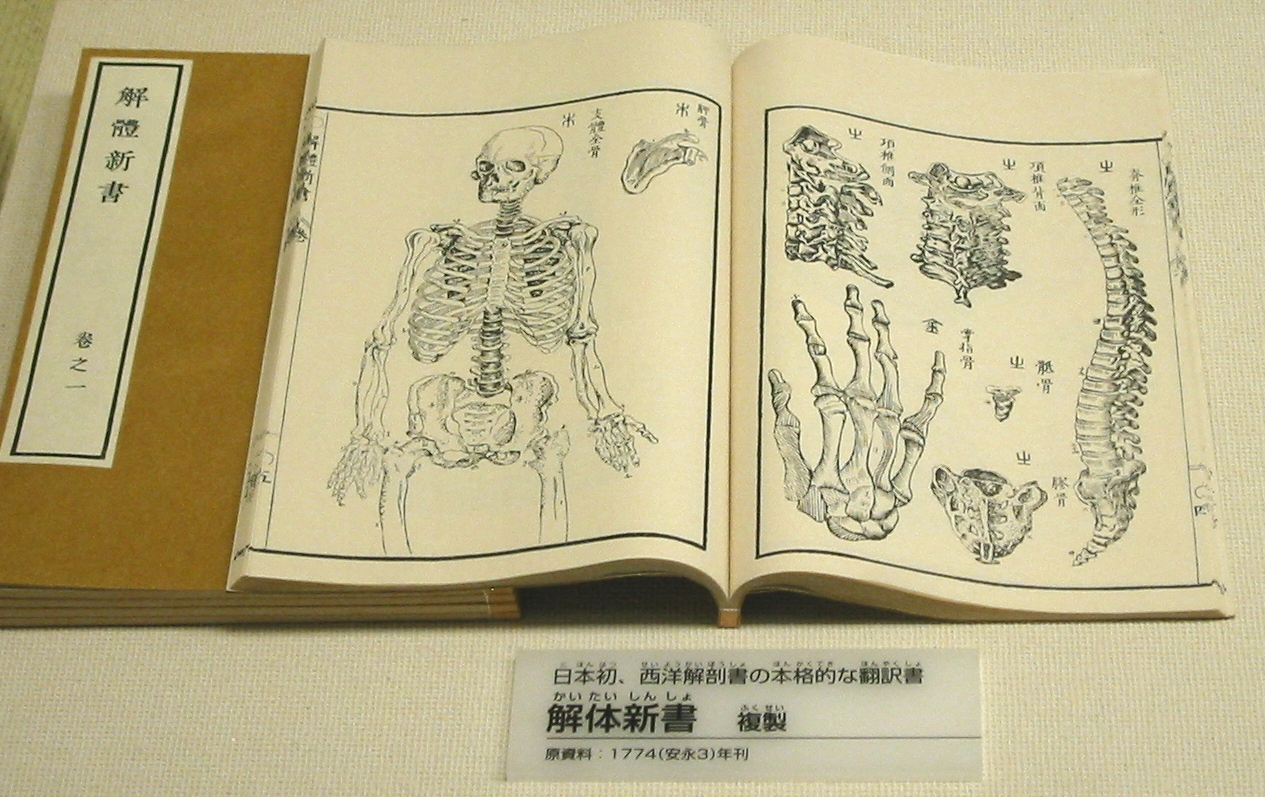
Japan's first translation of a Western book on anatomy, published in 1774 (National Museum of Nature and Science, Tokyo)

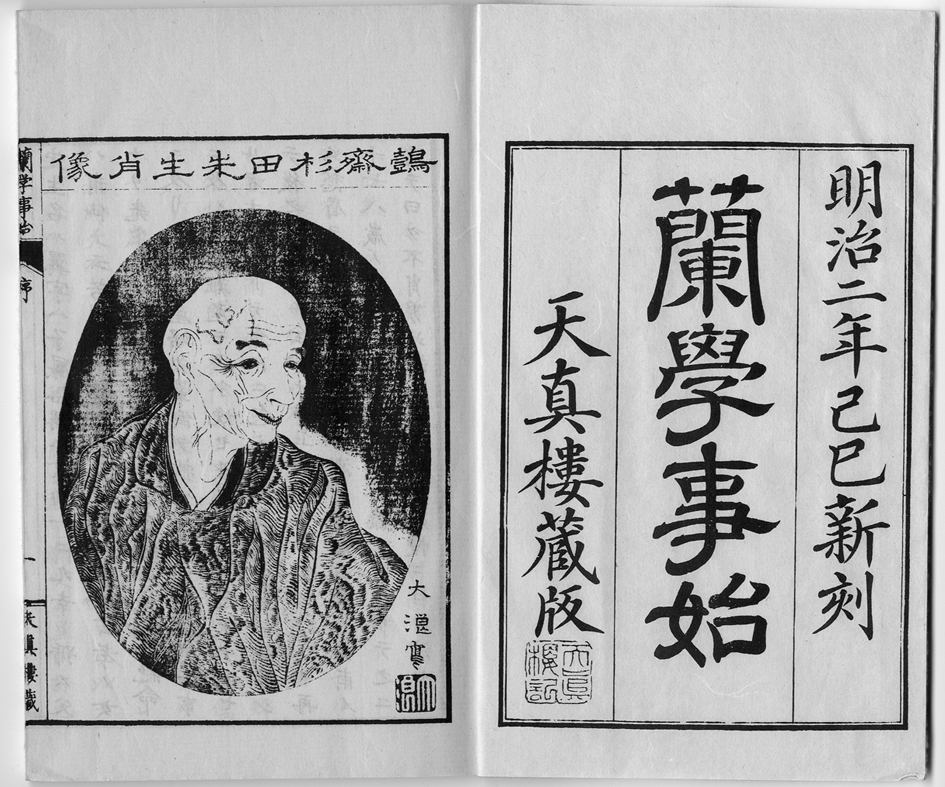
Sugita Gempaku's reminiscences Rangaku Kotohajime (The Beginnings of Dutch Studies, printed for the first time in 1869)

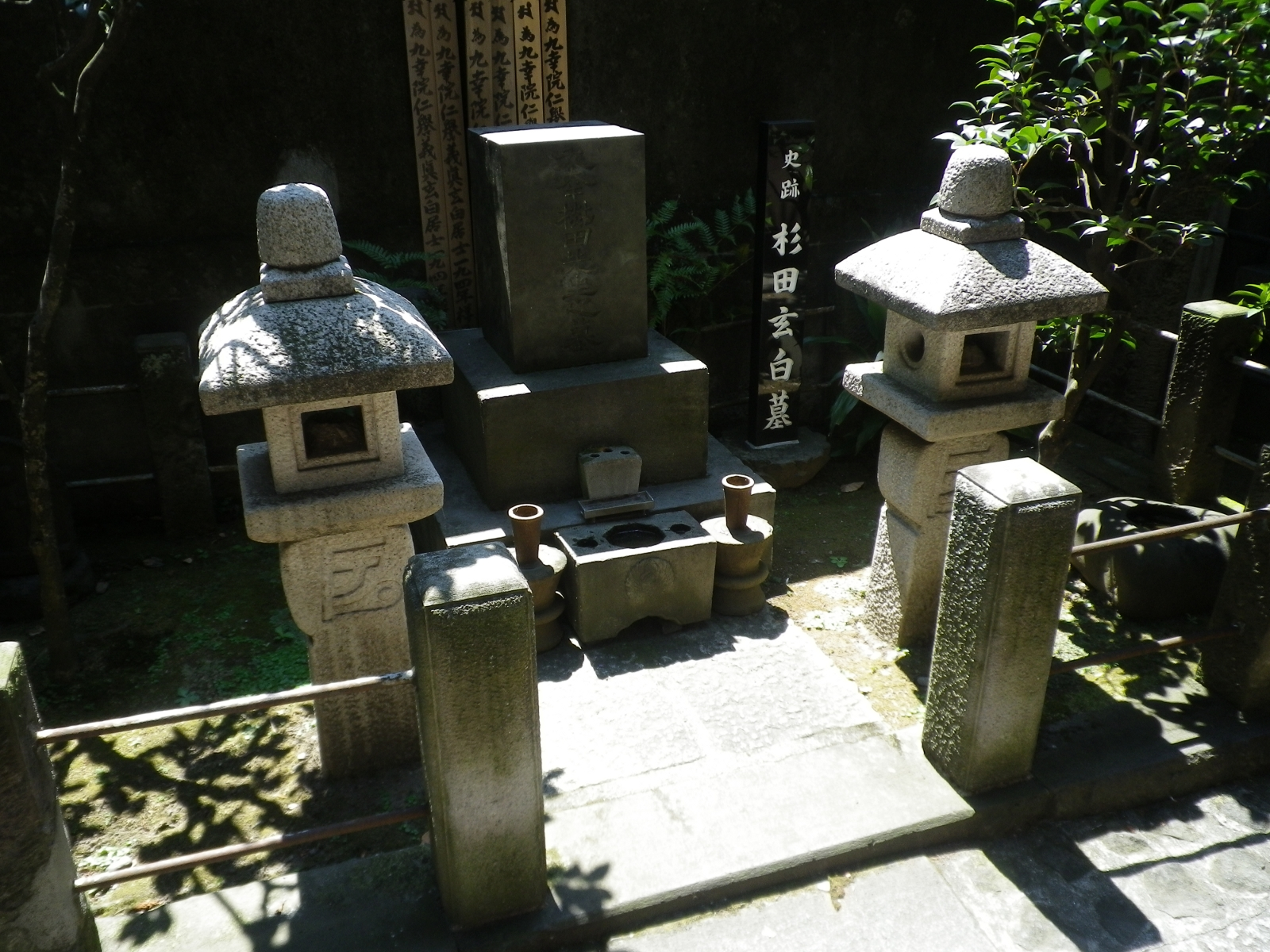
Sugita Genpaku's grave in the Eikan-Temple (Eikan-in, Tōkyō, Minato-ku)

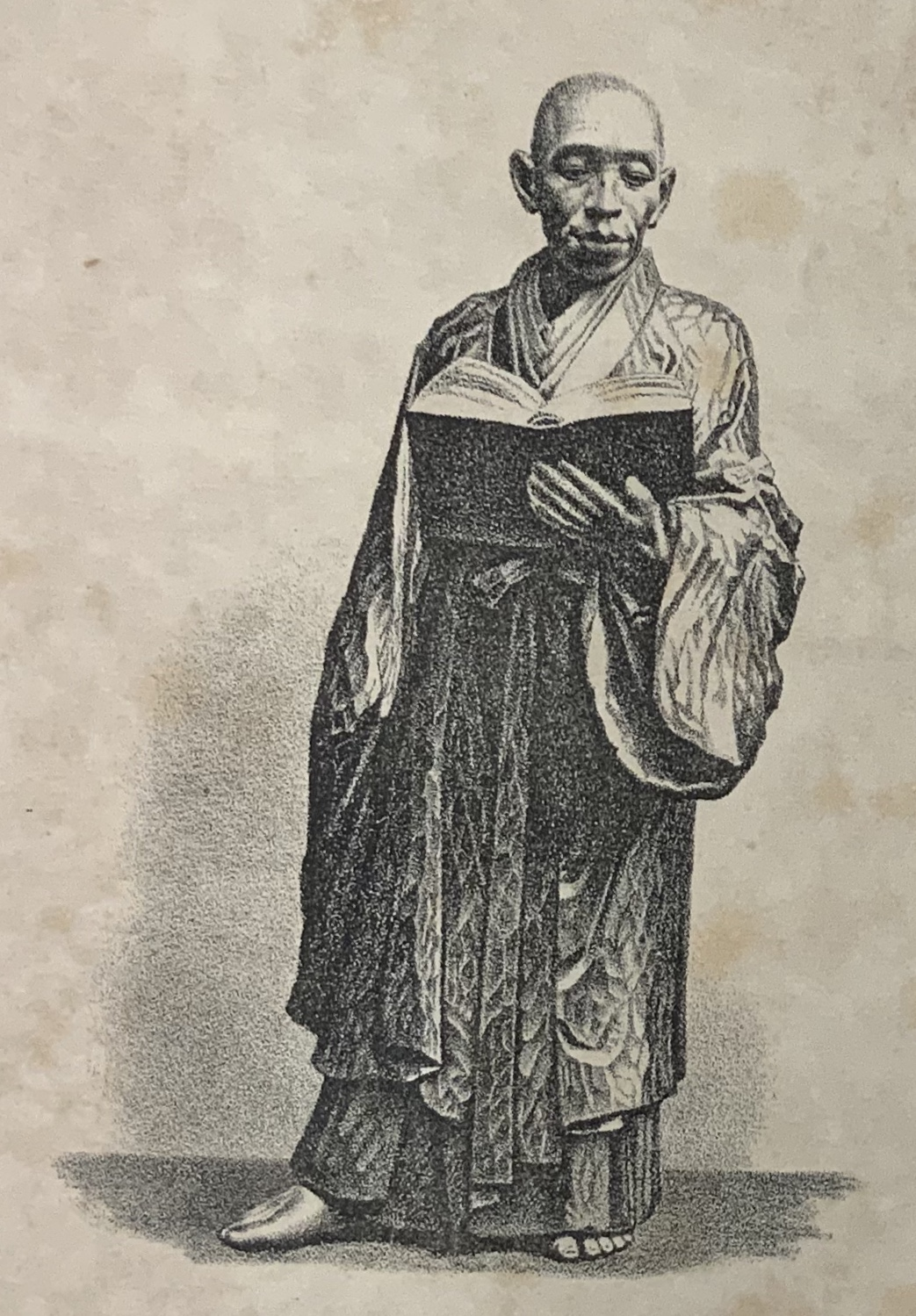
Drawing of Sugita Genpaku

== Bibliography ==
- Beukers, H; Luyendijk-Elshout, A. M.; van Opstall, M. E.; Vos, F. (1991). Red-Hair Medicine Dutch–Japanese medical relations. Vol. 36. Amsterdam: Cip-Gegevens Koninklijke Bibliotheek. pp. 1–114. ISBN 90-6203-680-5. PMID 11622823.
- Bowers, John (1970). Western Medical Pioneers in Feudal Japan. Baltimore, Maryland: The Johns Hopkins Press.
- Fujikawa, Y (1934). Japanese Medicine. New York: Paul B Hoeber Inc.
- Josephson, Jason Ā. (2012). The Invention of Religion in Japan. Chicago: University of Chicago Press. pp. 118–9. ISBN 9780226412351.
- Lock, Margaret M. (1980). East Asian medicine in urban Japan : varieties of medical experience. Berkeley: University of California Press. ISBN 0-520-03820-7. OCLC 6175233.
- Nakamura, Ellen Gardner, b. 1971 (2005). Practical pursuits : Takano Chōei, Takahashi Keisaku, and western medicine in nineteenth-century Japan. Cambridge, MA: Harvard University Asia Center. ISBN 0-674-01952-0. OCLC 57531412.
- Sugita, Genpaku (1969). The Dawn of Western Science in Japan. Chiyoda-ku, Tokyo, Japan: Hokuseido Press.
- Whitney, Norton (1885). Notes on the History of Medical Progress in Japan. Yokohama : R. Meiklejohn & Co.
