= Japanese clock =

Mechanical clock that has been made to tell traditional Japanese time

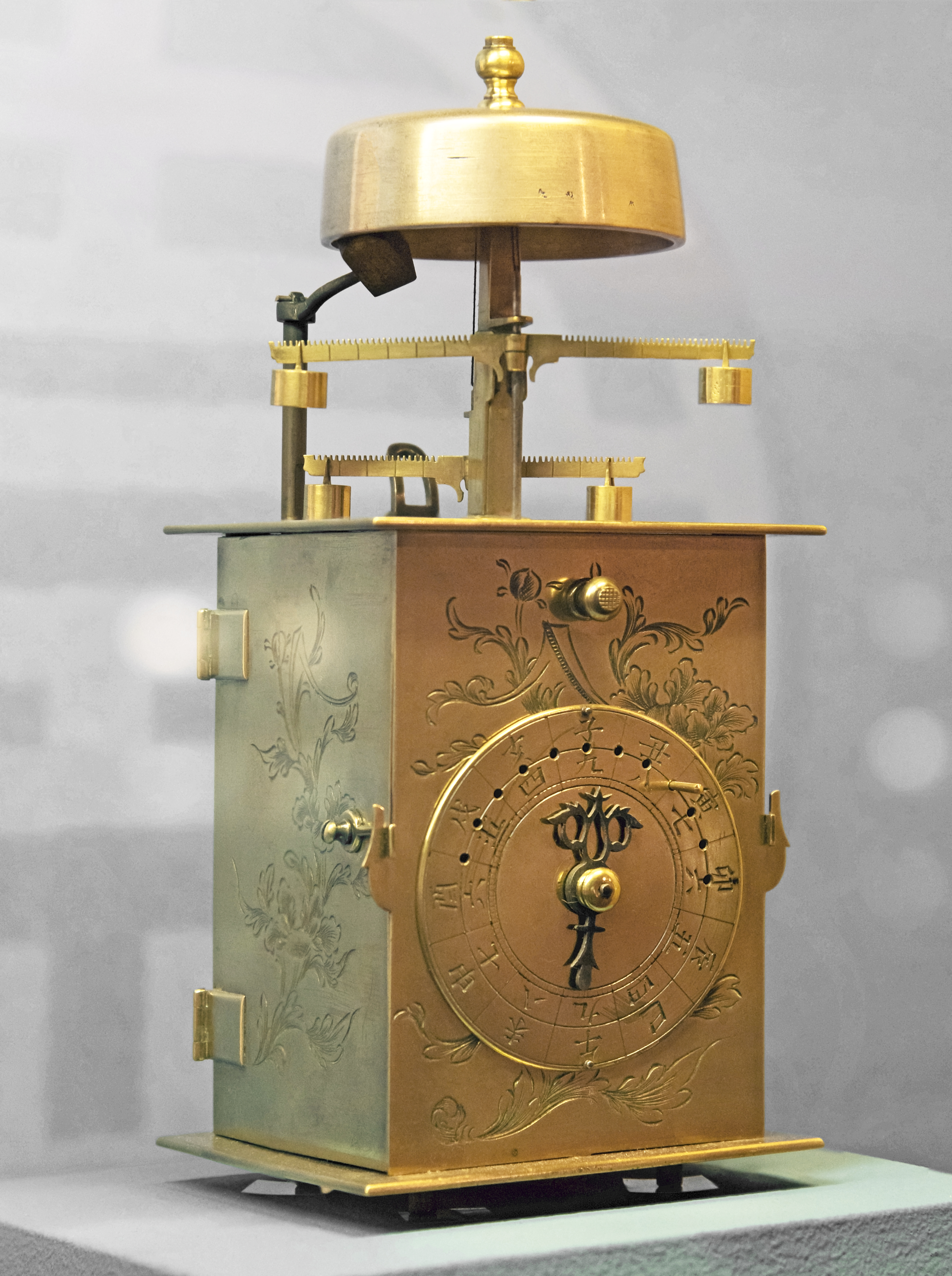
Two separate foliot balances allow this 18th-century Japanese clock to run at two different speeds to indicate unequal hours.

A Japanese clock (和時計, wadokei) is a mechanical clock that has been made to tell traditional Japanese time, a system in which daytime and nighttime are always divided into six periods whose lengths consequently change with the season. Mechanical clocks were introduced into Japan by Jesuit missionaries (in the 16th century) or Dutch merchants (in the 17th century). These clocks were of the lantern clock design, typically made of brass or iron, and used the relatively primitive verge and foliot escapement. Tokugawa Ieyasu owned a lantern clock of European manufacture.

Neither the pendulum nor the balance spring were in use among European clocks of the period, and as such they were not included among the technologies available to the Japanese clockmakers at the start of the isolationist period in Japanese history, which began in 1641. The isolationist period meant that Japanese clockmakers would have to find their own way without significant further inputs from Western developments in clockmaking. Nevertheless, the Japanese clockmakers showed considerable ingenuity in adapting the European mechanical clock technology to the needs of traditional Japanese timekeeping.

== History ==
Clocks have existed in Japan since the mid-7th century AD in the form of water clocks. The Nihon Shoki states that Emperor Tenchi made a water clock, or rōkoku (漏刻; literally "leaking" + "cutting, measuring"), in 660 and 671. These clocks were used for another 800 years until the arrival of Christianity in Japan in the 16th century.

Christian missionaries were among the first to introduce Japan to Western mechanical spring driven clocks. Francis Xavier, a Spanish Society of Jesus saint and missionary, gave Ouchi Yoshitaka, a daimyō of the Sengoku period, a mechanical clock in 1551. Other missionaries and embassies soon followed, with a mechanized clock being given to Oda Nobunaga in 1569 and Toyotomi Hideyoshi in 1571 by Papal envoys, and two clocks given to Tokugawa Ieyasu, one in 1606 by a missionary and one in 1611 by a Portuguese envoy. The oldest surviving Western clock in Japan dates back to 1612; it was given to Shōgun Ieyasu by the viceroy of Mexico (then New Spain).

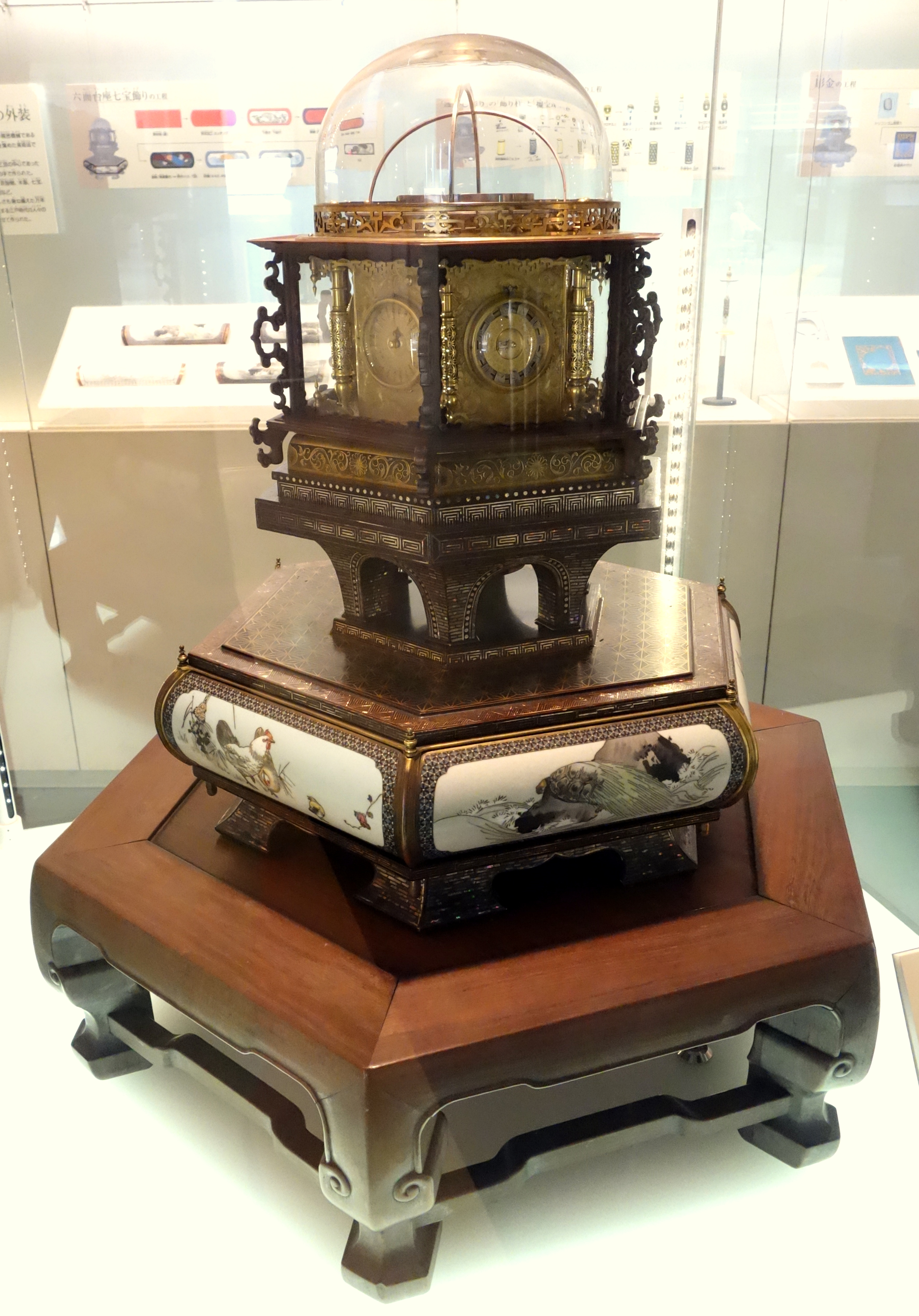
Tanaka Hisashige's man-nen dokei (万年時計). Completed in 1851.

Near the turn of the 17th century, the first Western-styled, mechanical clocks were produced by Japanese natives. Tsuda Sukezaemon is reported to have made a mechanical clock in 1598 after he had examined and repaired many imported clocks on his own. Japanese clock making was facilitated in the 17th century by missionaries living in Japan. Christian missionaries were the first to instruct the Japanese on clockmaking in the Amakusa islands around the turn of the 17th century.

The Edo period (1603–1868) saw the adaptation of Western techniques to form a unique method of clock making in Japan. A double escapement was designed by Japanese clockmakers in order to develop a clock that followed the uneven, traditional Japanese time schedule. These clocks, called wadokei, were built with different methods in order to follow the temporal hour system (futei jiho 不定時法). The foliots of the clocks have several divisions allowing the user to set a relatively accurate rate. Foliot-controlled clocks, despite being widely replaced in Europe by circular-balanced clocks, were utilized in Japan due to their adaptability to the temporal hour system. Constant weight and dial adjustments led Japanese clock makers to develop the nichō-tenpu tokei (二挺天府時計) or "two-bar governor clock", around 1780. The weights in the nichō-tempu tokei were automatically set for the correct time of day or night with the use of two governors or balances, called tenpu (天府).

A key component of the development of Japanese clocks was the publication of Hosokawa Hanzo's Karakuri Zui in 1796, in which he explains production methods of clocks in the first volume, and karakuri ningyō (絡繰人形) or "mechanical dolls" in the second and third volumes. The volume on clockmaking contained highly detailed instructions for the production of a weight-driven, striking clock with a verge escapement controlled by a foliot. Relatively high literacy rates and an enthusiastic, book-lending society contributed greatly to the work's widespread readership.

The production and complexity of clocks reached its peak with Tanaka Hisashige's man-nen dokei (万年時計) or myriad year clock. This has six faces that feature a Western clock, a lunar phase indicator, the oriental zodiac, a Japanese temporal clock, the ancient Japanese 24-phase division indicator, and an indicator for the day of the week. The clock was said to be able to run for a year on a single winding.

After the Meiji Restoration in 1868, Japan eventually abolished the use of its temporal hour system. The Meiji Cabinet issued Ordinance No. 453 in 1872 which switched Japan from the lunar calendar to the Western, solar calendar. The switch led to the decline of wadokei and the emergence of a Western-styled clock industry in Japan.

== Temporal hours ==
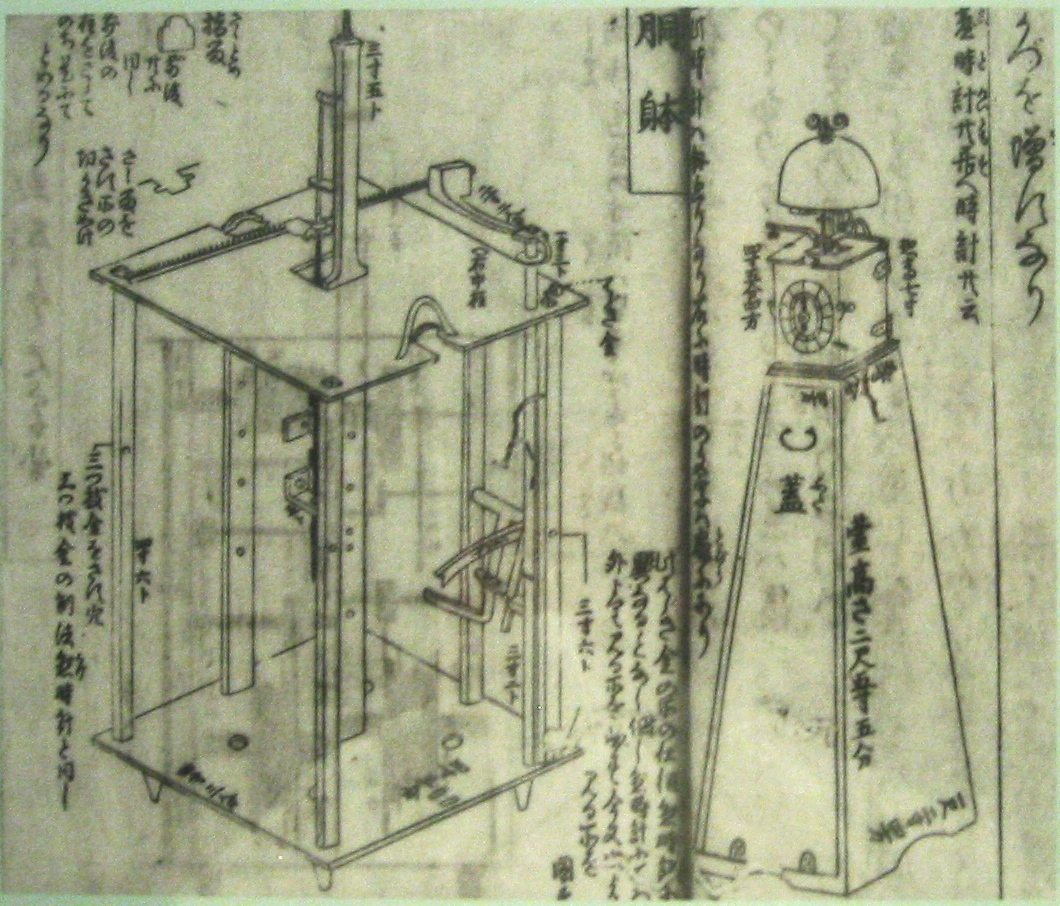
Drawing of the mechanism of a Japanese clock. Karakuri Zui, 1796.

Adapting the European clock designs to the needs of Japanese traditional timekeeping presented a challenge to Japanese clockmakers. Japanese traditional timekeeping practices required the use of unequal time units: six daytime units from local sunrise to local sunset, and six night-time units from sunset to sunrise.

As such, Japanese timekeepers varied with the seasons; the daylight hours were longer in summer and shorter in winter, with the opposite at night. European mechanical clocks were, by contrast, set up to tell equal hours that did not vary with the seasons.

Most Japanese clocks were driven by weights. However, the Japanese were also aware of, and occasionally made, clocks that ran from springs. Like the Western lantern clocks that inspired their design, the weight driven clocks were often held up by specially built tables or shelves that allowed the weights to drop beneath them. Spring driven Japanese clocks were made for portability; the smallest were the size of large watches, and carried by their owners in inrō pouches.

== Traditional Japanese time system ==
The traditional Japanese time system divided daytime and nighttime into six periods. This meant the lengths of the periods consequently change with the season.

The typical clock had six numbered hours from 9 to 4, which counted backwards from noon until midnight; the hour numbers 1, 2, and 3 were not used in Japan for religious reasons, because these numbers of strokes were used by Buddhists to call to prayer. The count ran backwards because the earliest Japanese artificial timekeepers used the burning of incense to count down the time. Dawn and dusk were therefore both marked as the sixth hour in the Japanese timekeeping system.

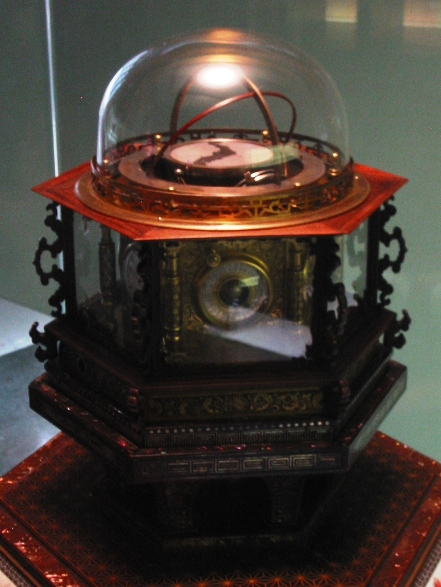
Tanaka Hisashige's 1851 myriad year clock displays Japanese, equal hour, and calendar information.

In addition to the numbered temporal hours, each hour was assigned a sign from the Japanese zodiac. Starting at dawn, the six daytime hours were:

The traditional Chinese 12 Earthly Branches and 24 Cardinal Directions; the 12 Earthly Branches are the basis for the zodiacal assignments of the Japanese hours.

Zodiac sign	Zodiac symbol	Japanese numeral	Strikes	Solar time
Rabbit	卯	六	6	sunrise
Dragon	辰	五	5	morning
Snake	巳	四	4	morning
Horse	午	九	9	noon
Goat	未	八	8	afternoon
Monkey	申	七	7	afternoon

From dusk, the six nighttime hours were:

Zodiac sign	Zodiac symbol	Japanese numeral	Strikes	Solar time
Rooster	酉	六	6	sunset
Dog	戌	五	5	evening
Pig	亥	四	4	evening
Rat	子	九	9	midnight
Ox	丑	八	8	before dawn
Tiger	寅	七	7	before dawn

== The problem of varying hour lengths ==
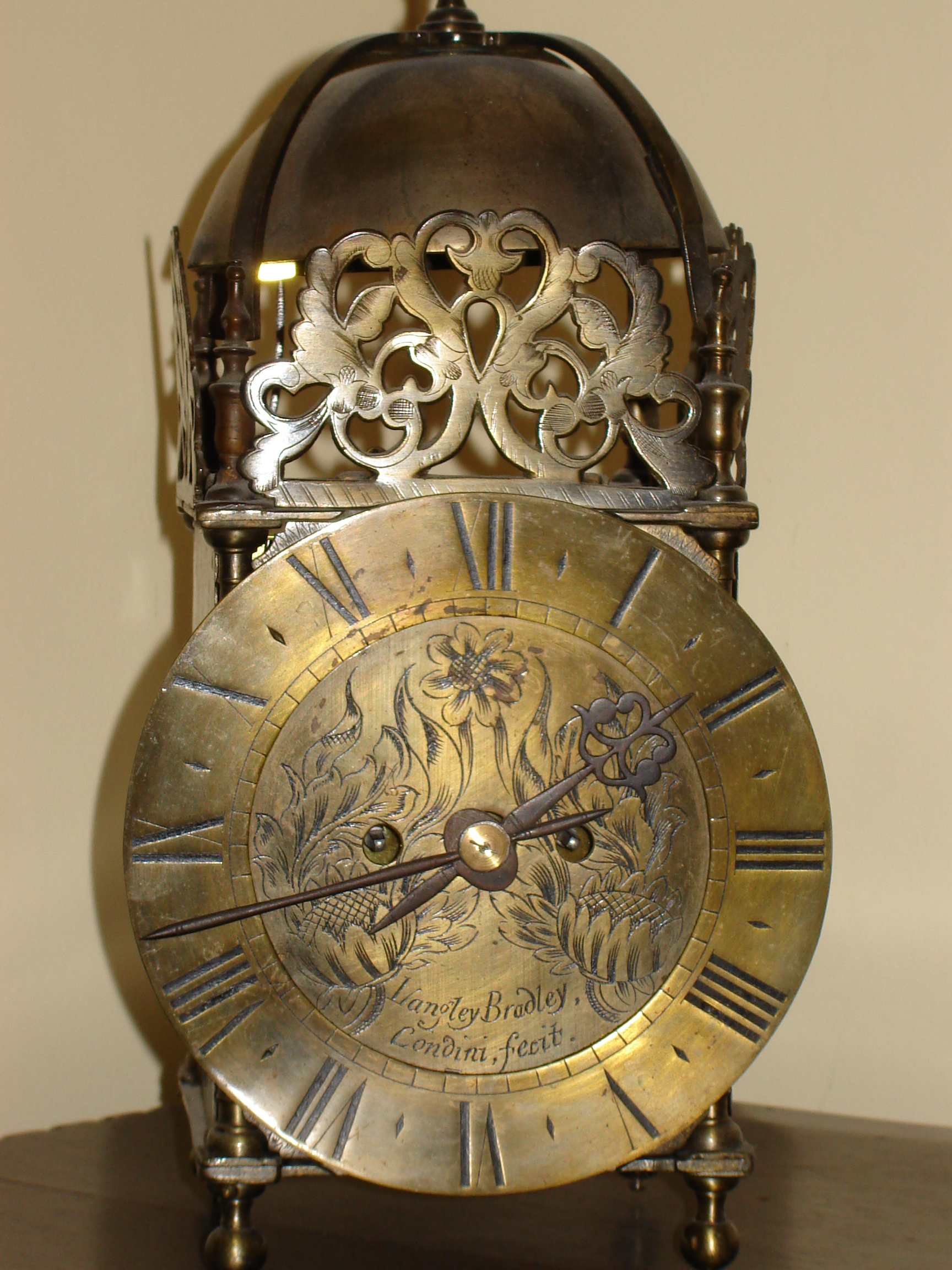
European lantern clocks such as this one were the starting point for the design of Japanese clocks.

Beginning in 1844 the calendar was revised to provide differing hour lengths for different parts of the year. Japanese clocks used various mechanisms to display the changing temporal hours. The most practical way was with a pillar clock, where the clock indicated time not on a clock face, but on an indicator attached to a weight that descended in a track. Movable time indicators ran alongside the track of the weight and its attached indicator. These indicators could be adjusted for the seasons to show the length of the day and nighttime hours. When the clock was wound, the indicator was moved back up the track to the appropriate marker. This setup had the advantage of being independent of the rate of the clock itself.

The use of clock faces was part of the European technology received in Japan, and a number of arrangements were made to display Japanese hours on clock faces. Some had movable hours around the rim of a 24-hour clock dial. Others had multiple clock faces that could be changed with the seasons. To make a striking clock that told Japanese time, clockmakers used a system that ran two balances, one slow and one fast. The appropriate escapement was changed automatically as the time moved from day to night. The myriad year clock designed in 1850 by Tanaka Hisashige uses this mechanism.

For the temporal hour complication on some of his wrist watches, Masahiro Kikuno uses a series of arms linked to the individual hours. These arms are connected to a single cam with a groove cut in it tuned to the latitude of each watch's individual buyer. The movement of the cam over a single year changes the position of the hours on the watch face.

In 1873 the Japanese government adopted Western style timekeeping practices, including equal hours that do not vary with the seasons, and the Gregorian calendar.

== Gallery ==
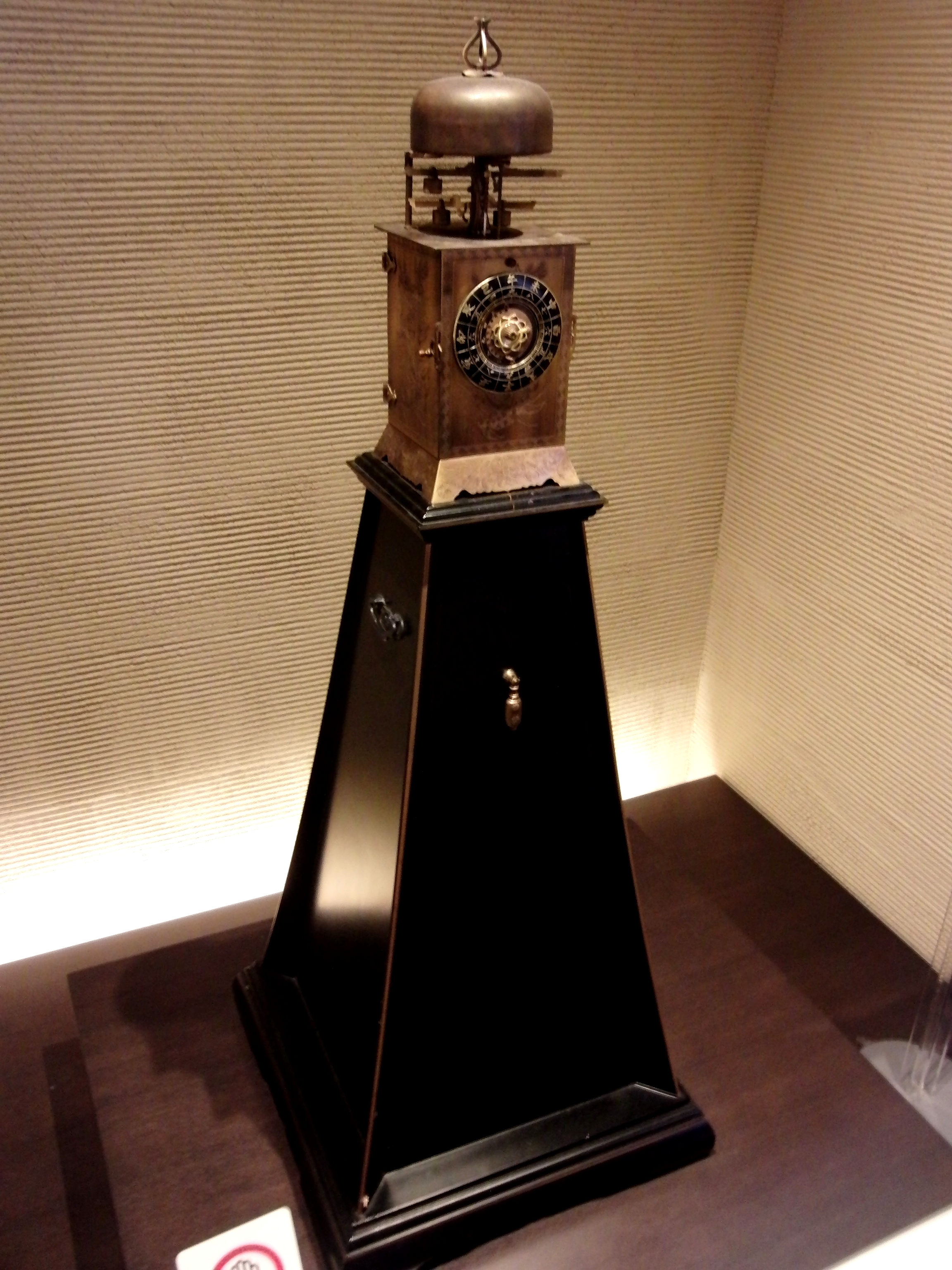
Nichō tenpu yagura-dokei (lantern clock with a double foliot mechanism)

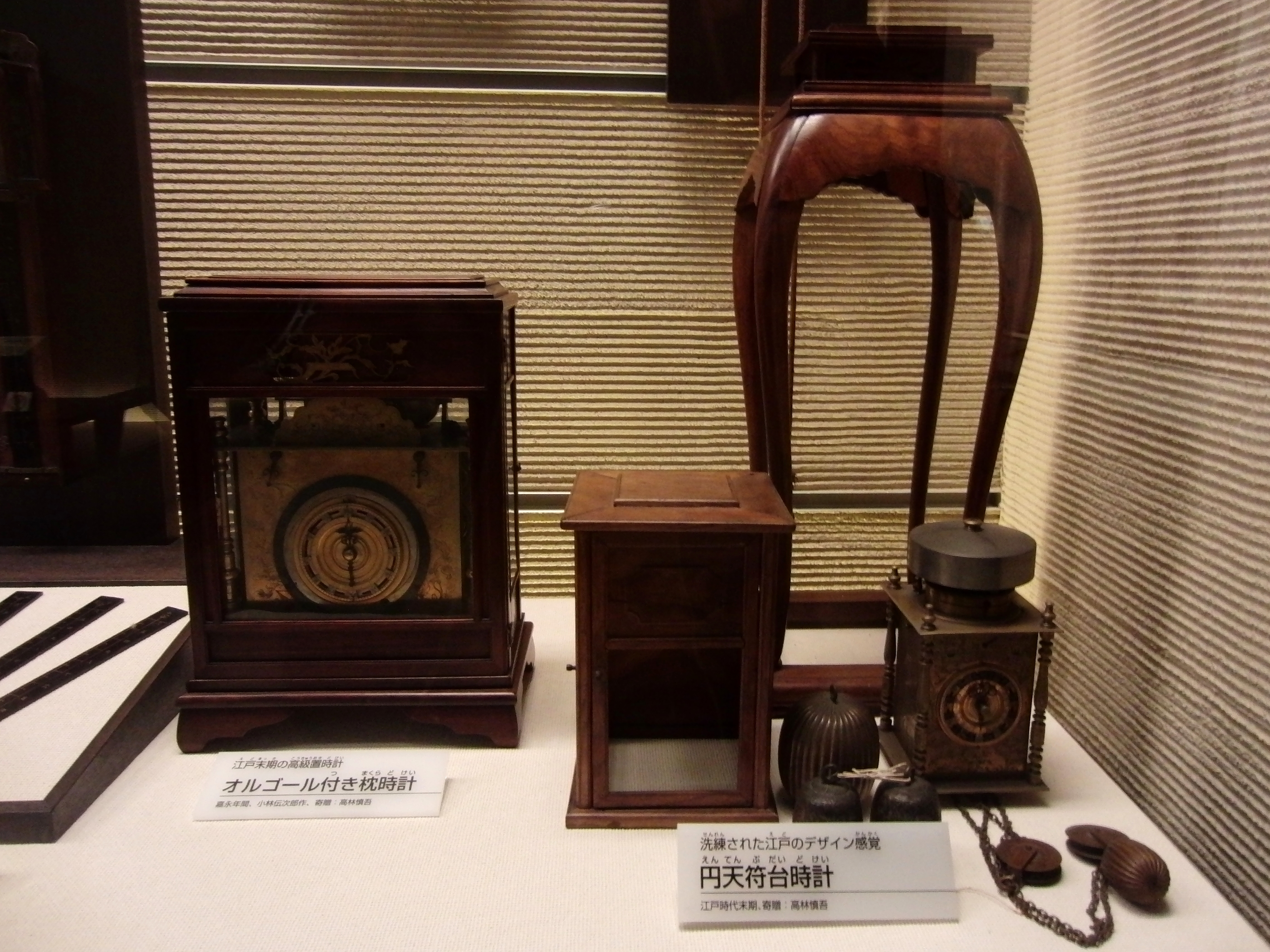
Left: Makura-dokei (pillow clock) with music box.
Right: Dai-dokei (pedestal clock) with circular balance.

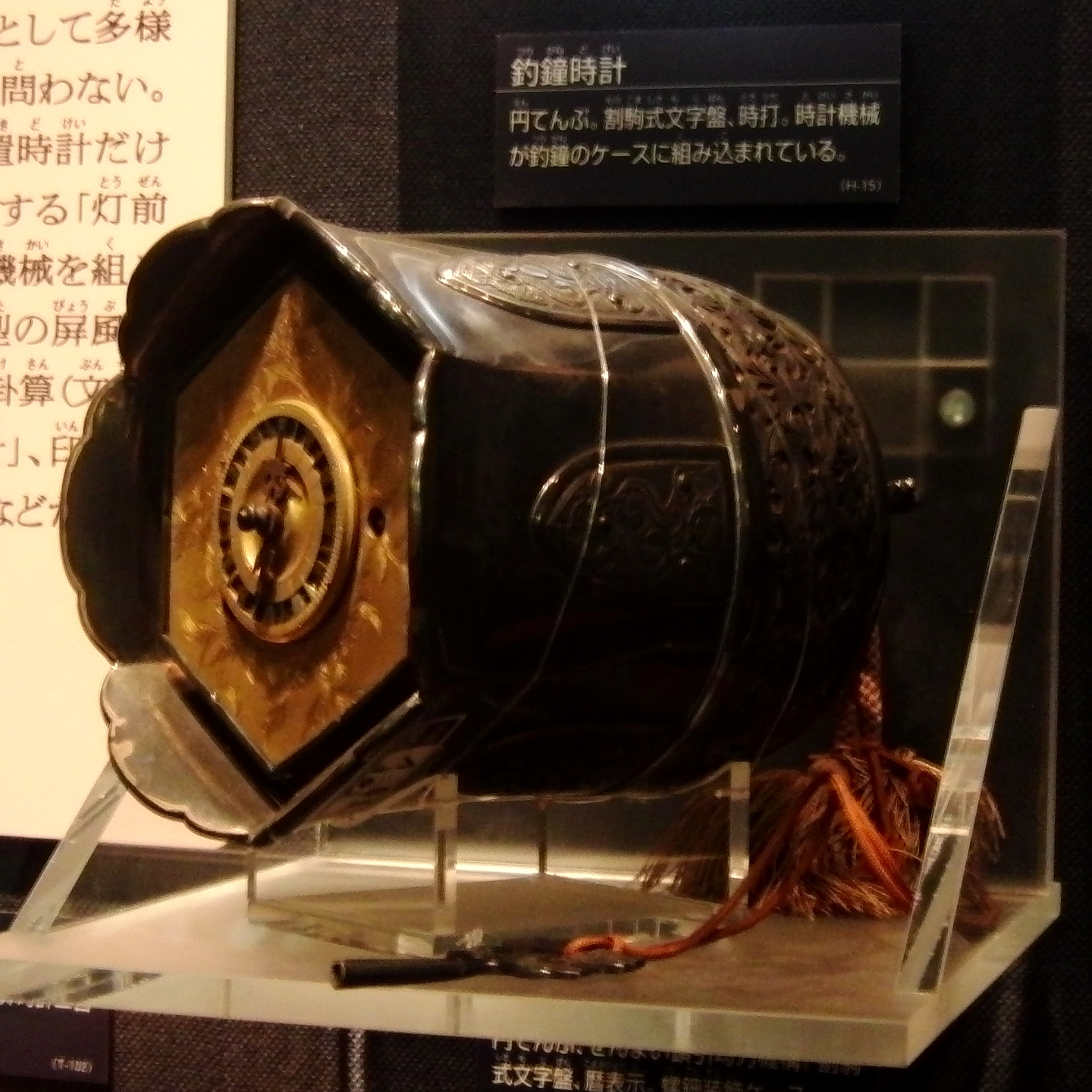
Tsurigane-dokei (hanging bell-shaped clock)

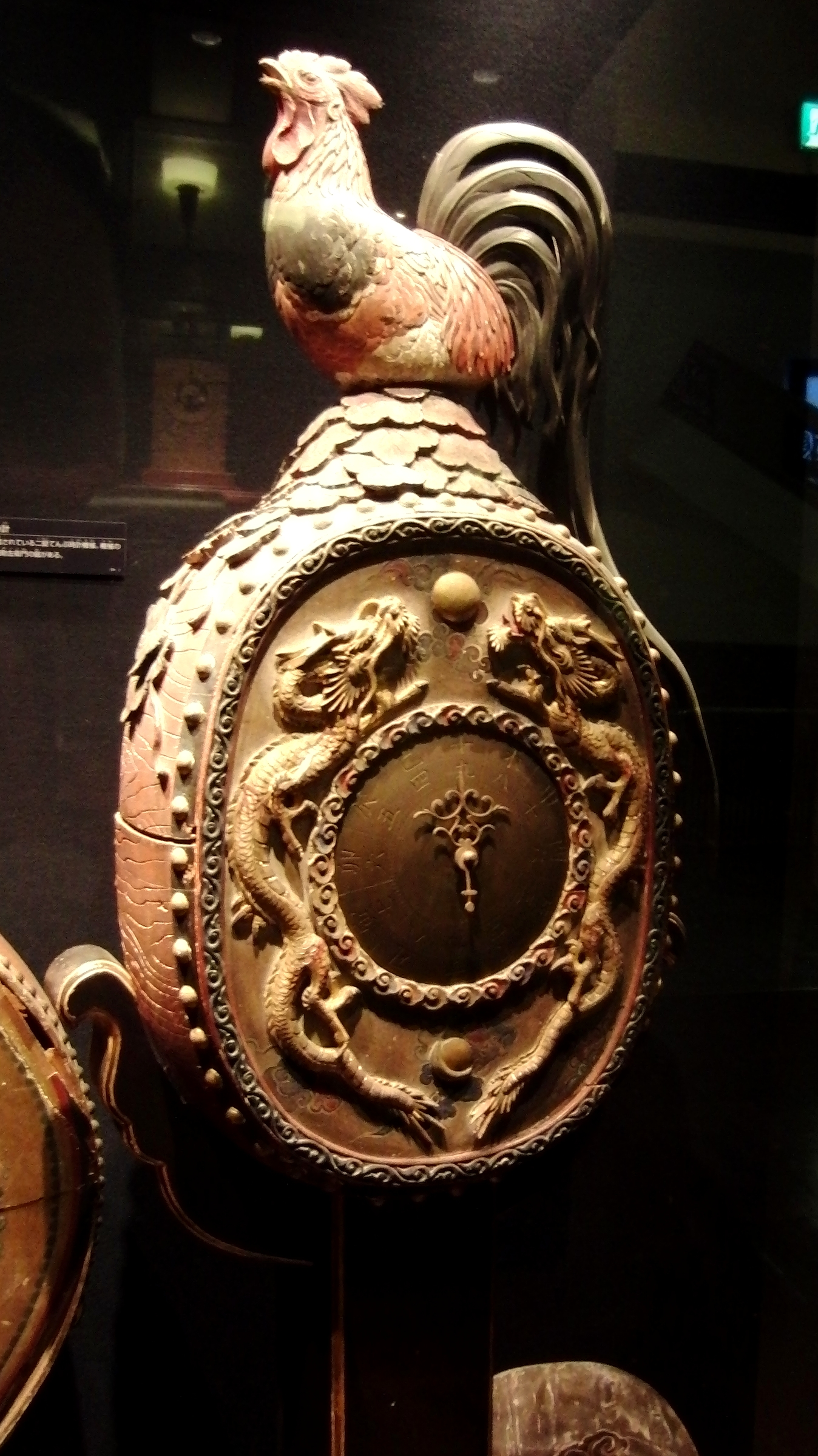
Taiko-dokei

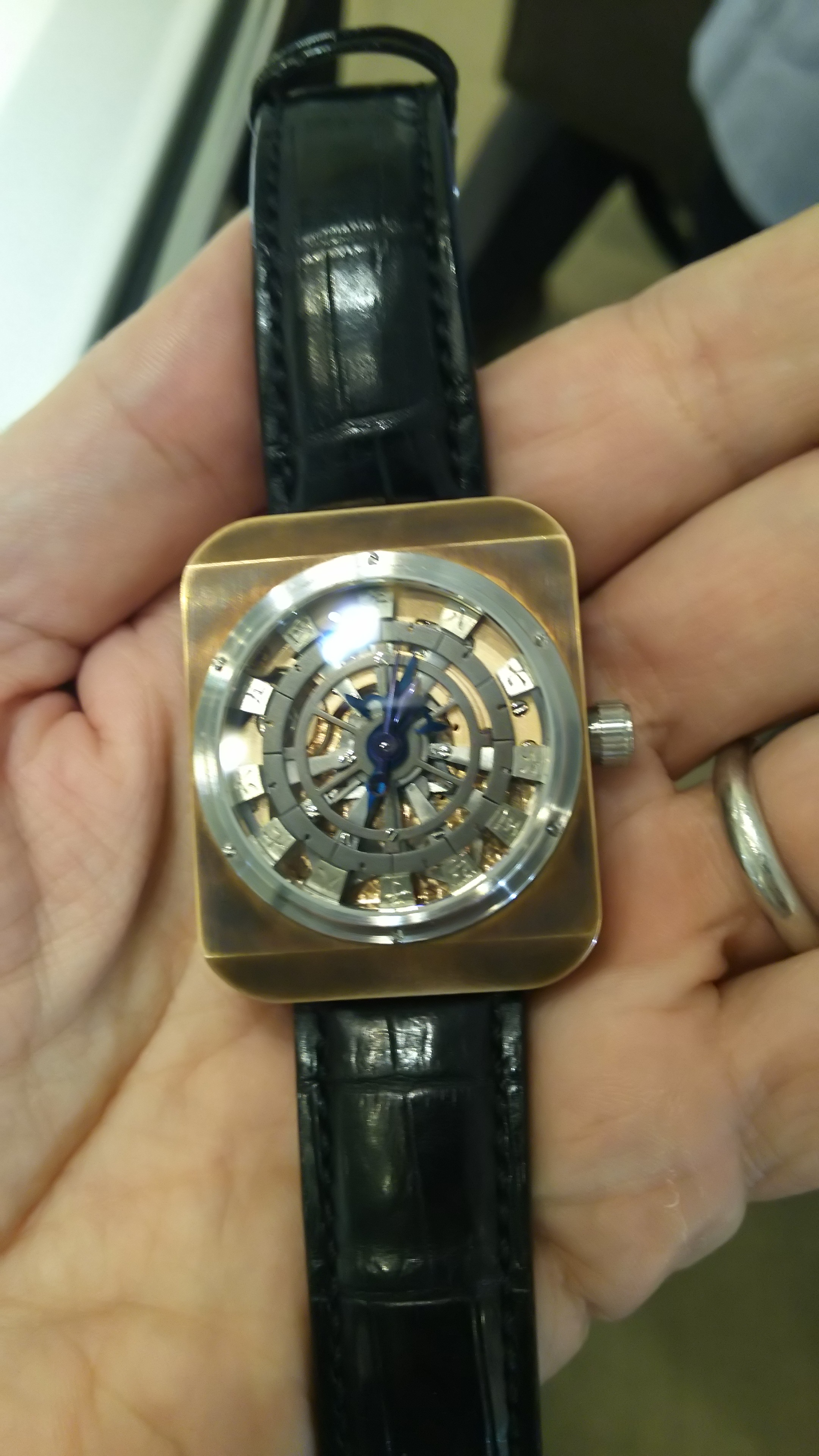
Wadokei Revision wristwatch that tells Japanese time and modern time by Masahiro Kikuno

== See also ==
- Daimyo Clock Museum
- Myriad year clock
- Earthly Branches (traditional Chinese timekeeping)
- Chinese calendar
- Equation clock

== Bibliography ==
- Anthony Aveni, Empires of Time: Calendars, Clocks, and Culture (Univ. Colorado, 2002) ISBN 0-87081-672-1
- Eric Bruton, The History of Clocks and Watches (Time Warner, repr. 2002) ISBN 0-316-72426-2
- E. G. Richards, Mapping Time: The Calendar and Its History (Oxford, 2000) ISBN 0-19-286205-7
- Hanzo Hosokwa, Karakuri Zui (機巧圖彙) ISBN 978-4-434-14213-0
- Murakami Kazuo, Japanese Automata Krakuri Zui (Murakami Kazuo, 2012) ISBN 978-4-9906228-0-0
