= Kikuno =

Kikuno (written: 菊野) is a Japanese surname. Notable people with the surname include:

- Katsunori Kikuno (菊野 克紀, born 1981), Japanese mixed martial artist
- Masahiro Kikuno (菊野 昌宏, born 1983), Japanese watchmaker
