= Masahiro Kikuno =

Japanese watchmaker

- Born: February 8, 1983 (age 43); Hokkaido, Japan
- Education: Hiko Mizuno Watchmaking School
- Style: watchmaking
- Website: www.masahirokikuno.jp

Masahiro Kikuno (菊野 昌宏, Kikuno Masahiro; born February 8, 1983) is a Japanese watchmaker and youngest member of Académie Horlogère des Créateurs Indépendants.

As a child, Kikuno had a fascination with mechanical items. He wore out the owners manual of the family car looking through it at age 2. After high school, he joined the Japanese military where his skills in dismantling and reassembling weapons were noted and he was placed in a job repairing rifles.

Kikuno studied at the Hiko Mizuno Watchmaking School though the three year course focused on repair rather than creating new timepieces (WOSTEP). He instead turned to George Daniels step by step book Watchmaking and taught himself, afterwards teaching watchmaking at the school for three more years. He sold his first watch at age 29.

Kikuno rose to prominence with the debut of his 2011 adaptation of Hisashige Tanaka's myriad year clock in wristwatch form at BaselWorld. This wadokei clock which measures temporal hours which change in length with the seasons. Made completely by hand, 6 daylight hours and 6 night hours slowly move around the watch face with the seasons. Each ¥18million (approximately $160,000 USD) watch is tuned to the customer's latitude by Kikuno.
