= Karakuri =

Karakuri (Japanese: からくり, lit. 'mechanism') may refer to:

- Karakuri (manga), a manga by Masashi Kishimoto
- Karakuri puppet, Japanese 18th/19th century mechanized puppet or automaton
