= Daimyo Clock Museum =

Community-run museum in Yanaka, Tokyo, Japan

Coordinates: 35°43′17″N 139°45′59″E

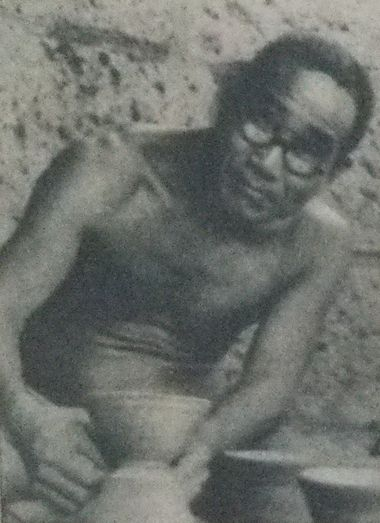
Guro Kamiguchi, collector of Japanese clocks

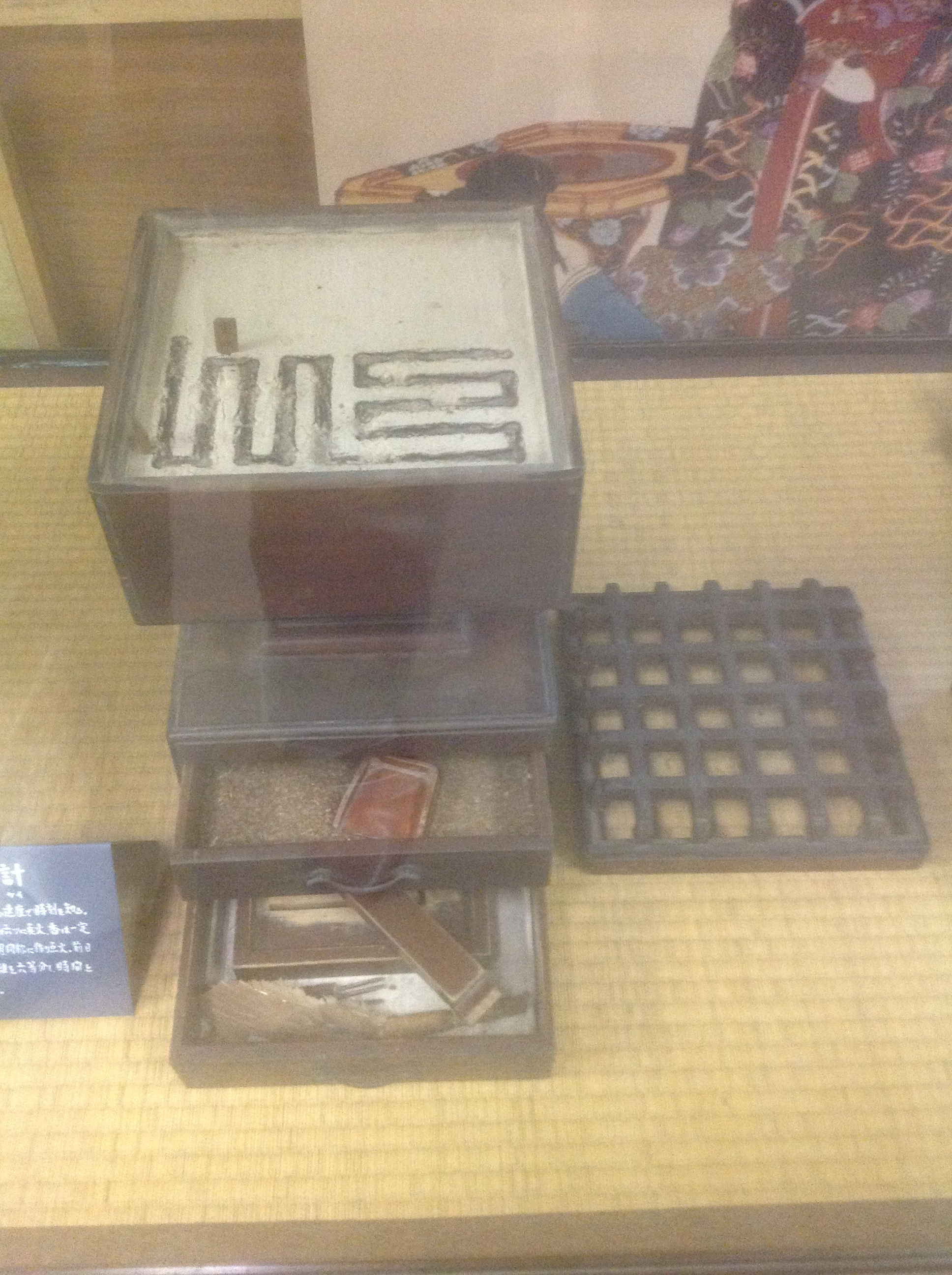
Japanese incense clock, Daimyo Clock Museum, Tokyo

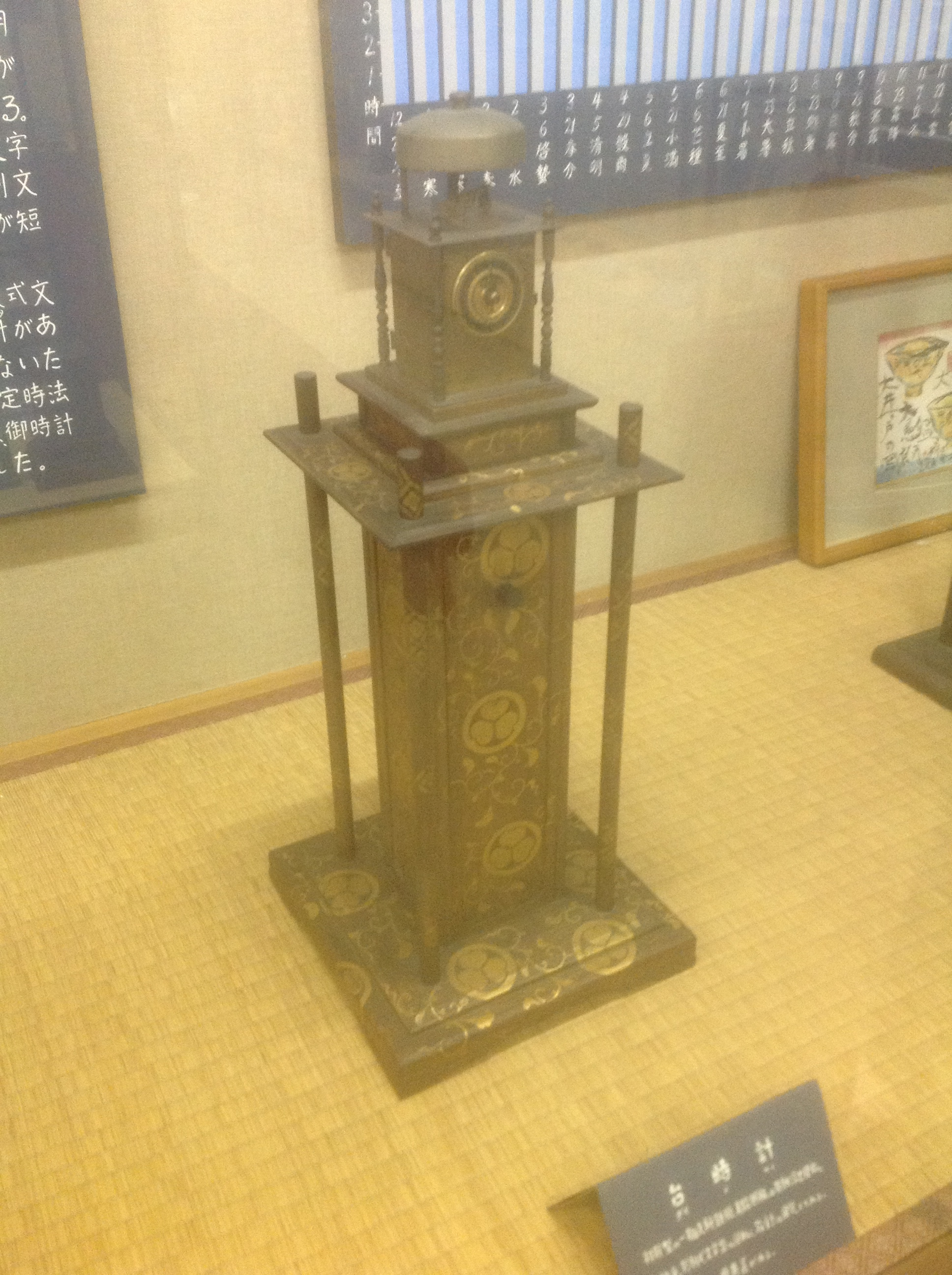
Japanese clock, Daimyo Clock Museum, Tokyo

The Daimyo Clock Museum (大名時計博物館) is a small community-run museum in Yanaka 2-chōme, Tokyo. The museum was established in 1972 to display Japanese clocks from the Edo period collected by Sakujiro (known as "Guro") Kamiguchi (1892–1970).

== Origin of the Museum collection ==
Sakujiro Kamiguchi owned a highly unusual log cabin shop which sold western clothing. The shop became known locally as "Grotesque", and this was the origin of Kamiguchi's nickname, "Guro". Kamiguchi had many interests, including pottery. He first became interested in Japanese clocks when he came across an English-made watch with an attached sundial in a local shop. Kamiguchi realised the unique cultural importance of daimyo clocks:

"Because the Tokugawa shōguns closed the country, a pure Japanese-style clock was created. Like the ukiyoe woodblock prints, the importance of these clocks was recognised abroad, and the clocks have been bought up at cut-rate prices and taken away from the country right up to the time of the Great Kanto Earthquake. Now it won't be long before a Japanese scholar wishing to research the development of these clocks will be reduced to visiting foreign collections."

In 1951, Kamiguchi established the Kamiguchi Japanese Clock Preservation Society, and gifted his collection to it. After his death in 1970, his son Hitoshi Kamiguchi became President of the Society and opened the museum in April 1972.

== Exhibits ==
Daimyōs ('great lords') were the feudal aristocracy of Japan in the Edo period and they were the only people who could afford expensive timepieces. The museum displays mechanical clocks, sundials and incense clocks previously owned by daimyo families. There are around 50 pieces on display from the collection's total of some 200 items, in a single 83 square metre room. The museum's labels are all in Japanese only, though an English-language pamphlet explaining the traditional Japanese timekeeping system is also available. Photography is not permitted.

== Access ==
The nearest metro station is Nezu on the Chiyoda Line. The nearest Japan Rail station is Nippori.
