= Myriad year clock =

Japanese cultural artifact

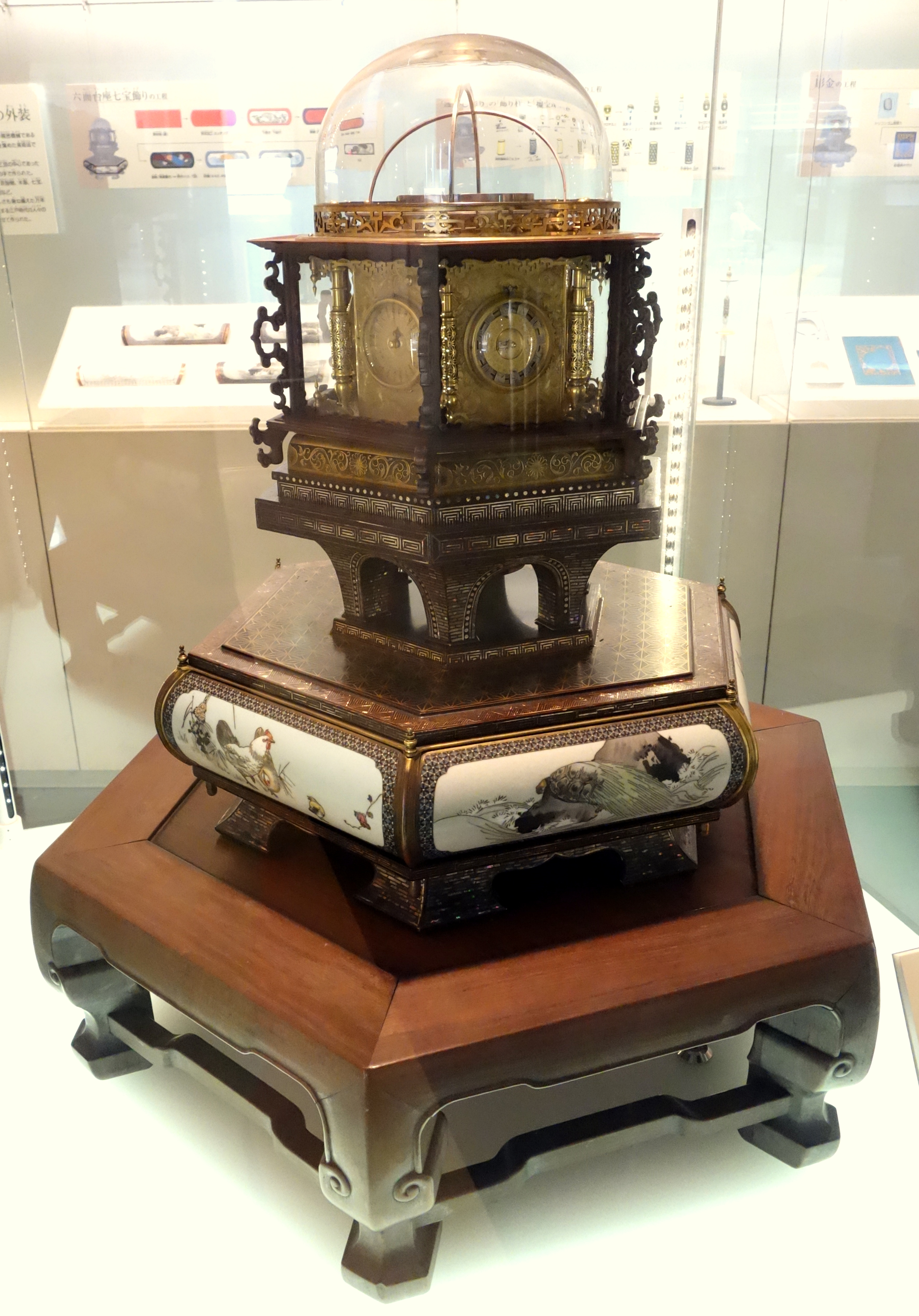
Tanaka Hisashige's Myriad year clock, in the National Museum of Nature and Science, Tokyo.

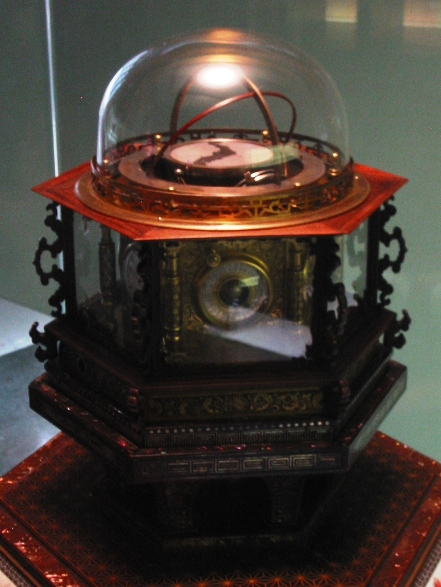
The clock displays Japanese, equal hour, and calendar information.

The Myriad year clock (万年自鳴鐘, Mannen Jimeishou; lit. 'Ten-Thousand Year Self-ringing Bell') is a universal clock designed by the Japanese inventor Hisashige Tanaka in 1851. It belongs to the category of Japanese clocks called Wadokei. This clock is designated as an Important Cultural Property and a Mechanical Engineering Heritage by the Japanese government.

The clock is driven by a spring. Once it is fully wound, it can work for one year without another winding. It can show the time in 7 ways (such as usual time, the day of the week, month, moon phase, Japanese time, Solar term). Since the time system in Japan at that time was temporal hour, a day was 12 hours, and a day was divided into day and night, and each divided into 6 equal parts was regarded as 1 hour. Because the length of the day and night changes according to the season, the time dial was automatically movable, and it was linked with the other six clocks, making it an extremely complicated mechanism. It also rings chimes every hour. It consists of more than 1,000 parts to realize these complex functions, and it is said that Tanaka made all the parts by himself with simple tools such as files and saws. It took more than three years for him to finish the assembly.

In 2004 the Japanese government funded a project aimed at making a copy of this clock. More than 100 engineers joined the project and it took more than 6 months with the latest industrial technologies. However, even then it was not possible to make exact copies of some parts, such as the brass metal plate used as its spring, before the presentation at Expo 2005. The original clock is displayed at the National Museum of Nature and Science, while a copy is at Toshiba Corporation.

The clock was listed in the Japanese Mechanical Engineering Heritage as item No. 22 in 2007.

== Sources ==
- Frumer, Yulia. Making Time: Astronomical Time Measurement in Tokugawa Japan. University of Chicago Press, 2019.
