= Tanaka Hisashige =

Japanese rangaku scholar, engineer and inventor

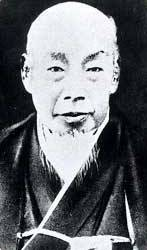
- Born: October 16, 1799; Kurume, Fukuoka, Japan
- Died: November 7, 1881 (aged 82); Tokyo, Japan
- Occupations: Businessman, inventor, mechanical engineer, rangaku scholar

Hisashige Tanaka (田中 久重; October 16, 1799 – November 7, 1881) was a Japanese businessman, inventor, mechanical engineer, and rangaku scholar who was prominent during the Bakumatsu and early Meiji period in Japan. In 1875, he founded what became the Toshiba Corporation. He has been called the "Thomas Edison of Japan" or "Karakuri Giemon."

== Biography ==
Tanaka was born in Kurume, Chikugo province (present-day Fukuoka prefecture) as the eldest son of a tortoise shell craftsman. Apprenticed at an early age, he was a gifted artisan. At the age of eight, he invented an inkstone case with a secret lock, which required a cord to be twisted in a certain manner to open it. At the age of 14, he had invented a loom capable of weaving intricate designs into fabric.

From age 20 he began to make karakuri puppet dolls, autonomous dolls powered by springs, pneumatics and hydraulics, capable of relatively complex movements, which were much in demand by the aristocrats of Kyoto, daimyō in feudal domains, and by the Shōgun's court in Edo. At age 21, he was performing around the country at festivals with clockwork dolls he constructed himself. He declined to take over the family business, surrendering his position to his younger brother and devoted his full attention to karakuri dolls. It is often said that the best masterpieces of his karakuri are Yumi-Hiki Doji (arrow-shooting boy) and Moji-kaki doll (letter-writing doll). In his mid-thirties, however, he aspired to invent more practical products. In 1834, he relocated to Osaka, where he experimented in pneumatics, hydraulics and forms of lighting based on rapeseed oil, including a pocket candlestick and an oil lamp with an air-pressurized fuel pump which proved to be very popular.

He then moved on to Kyoto, where he studied rangaku, or western learning, and astronomy. He invented a pneumatic fire pump, and in 1851, he built a myriad year clock which is now designated as an Important Cultural Property by the Japanese government.

With the development of the Sonnō jōi movement, the atmosphere in Kyoto became increasingly dangerous towards foreign influences and technology, and Tanaka was invited by Sano Tsunetami to Saga Domain in Kyūshū, where he was welcomed by Nabeshima Naomasa.

While in Saga, Tanaka designed and built Japan's first domestically made steam locomotive and steam warship. Although he had no previous experience in the field, he had access to a Dutch reference book and had watched the demonstration of a steam engine by the Russian diplomat Yevfimy Putyatin during his visit to Nagasaki in 1853. He later was a student at the Nagasaki Naval Training Center. On its closure and the withdrawal of its Dutch advisors, Tanaka moved back to Saga and worked at the Seirenkata, where he built models of steam warships (both with screws and with side-paddles), a steam locomotive and experimented with making a telegraph and a glass factory.

He was involved in the construction of a reverberatory furnace in Saga for the production of Armstrong guns. In 1864, he returned to his native Kurume Domain, where he assisted in the development of modern weaponry.

In 1873, six years after the Meiji Restoration, Tanaka, then age 74 and still energetic, was invited by the Ministry of Industry to come to Tokyo to make telegraphs at the ministry's small factory. He relocated to the Ginza district in 1875. He rented the second floor of a temple in what is now Roppongi as a workshop that evolved into his first company—Tanaka Seisakusho (Tanaka Engineering Works), the first manufacturer of telegraph equipment in Japan.

After his death in 1881, his son founded Tanaka Engineering Works (田中製造所, Tanaka Seizōsho). The company changed its name after Tanaka's death to Shibaura Engineering Works (芝浦製造所, Shibaura Seizōsho) in 1904. After a merger in 1939 with Tokyo Denki it became Tokyo Shibaura Denki, more commonly known today as Toshiba.

== Gallery ==
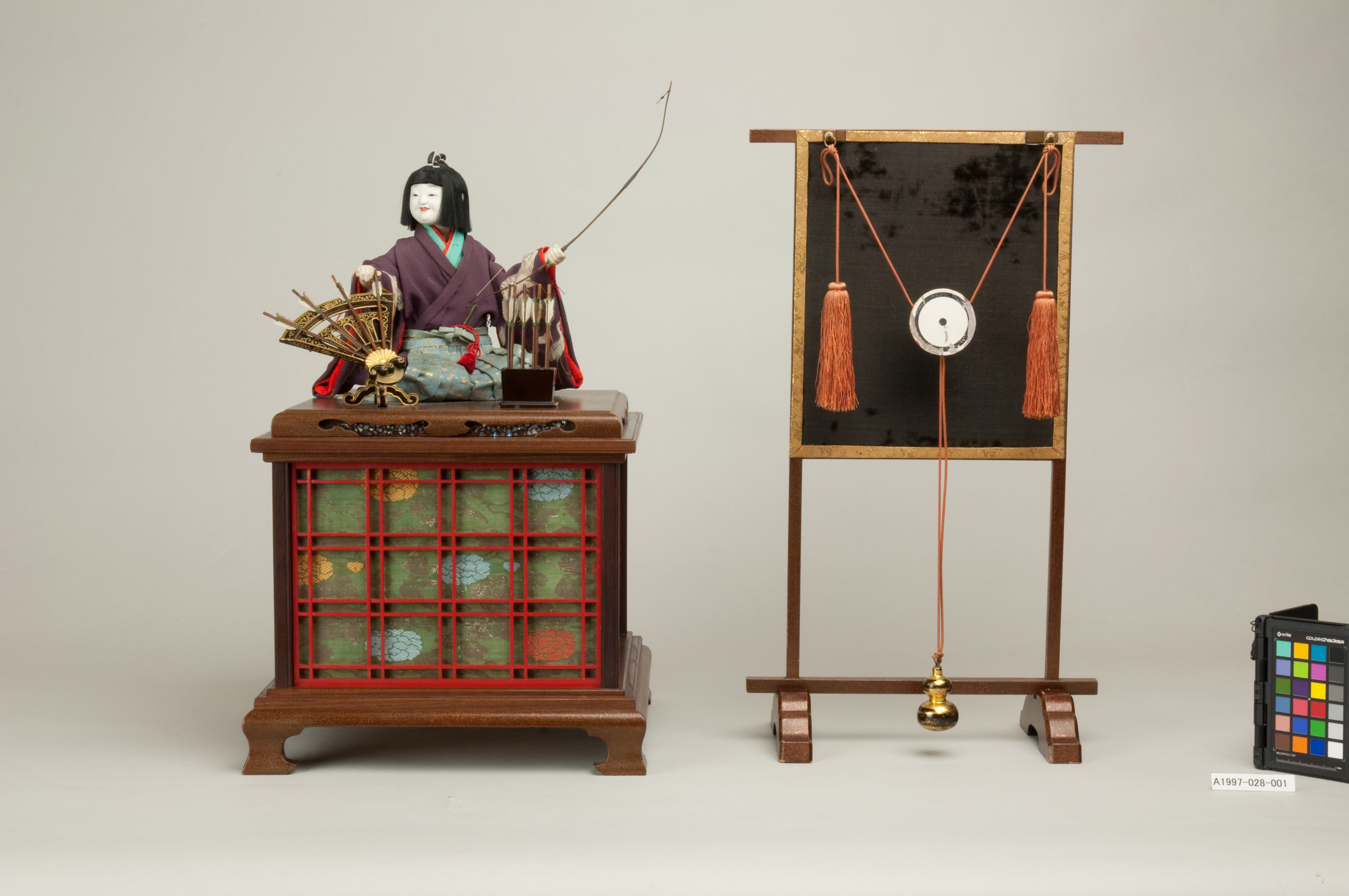
Karakuri puppet, Yumi-Hiki Doji. Using mechanical power, a puppet shoots a target with a bow and arrow.

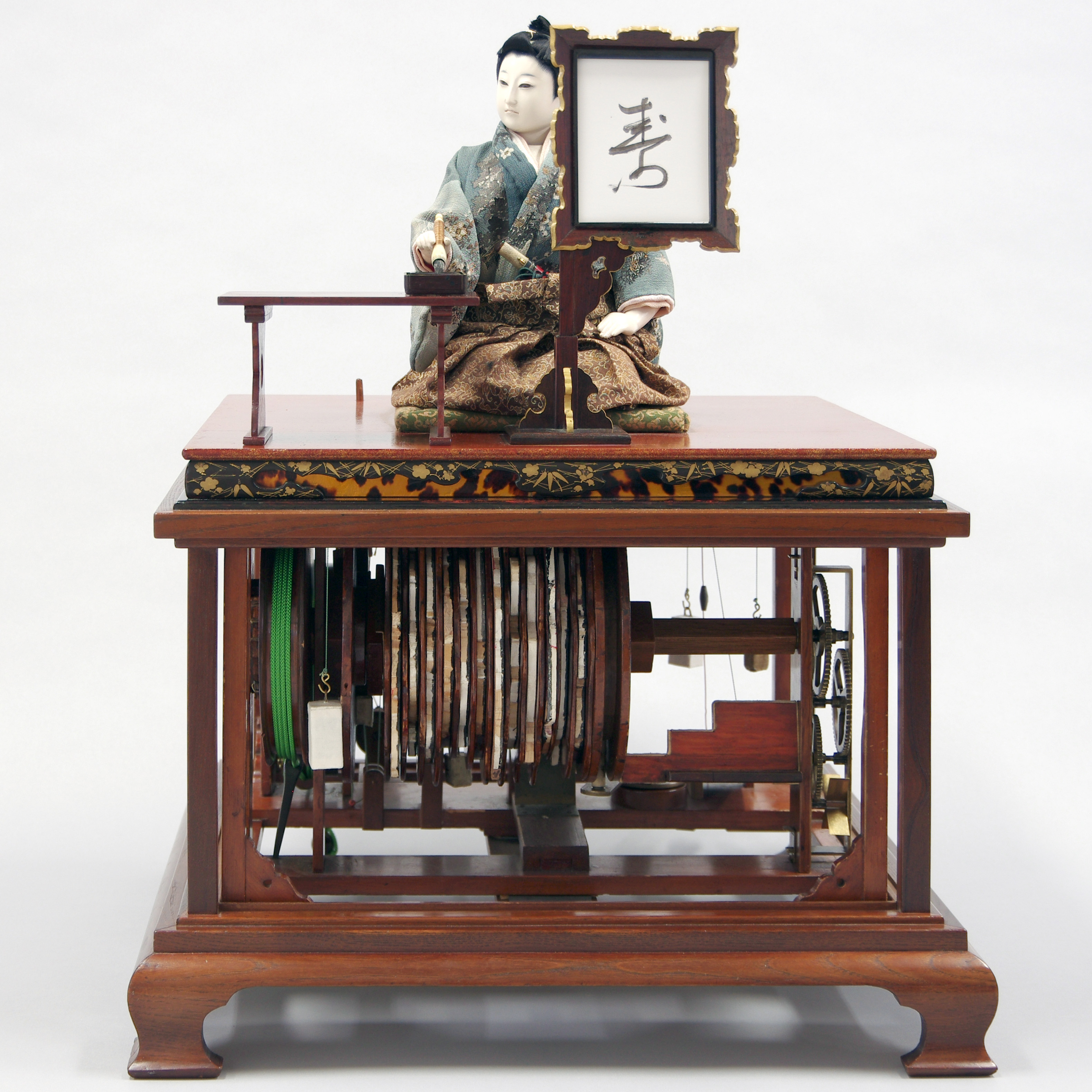
Karakuri puppet, Moji-kaki doll. Using mechanical power, a puppet dips a brush into ink and writes a character on paper.

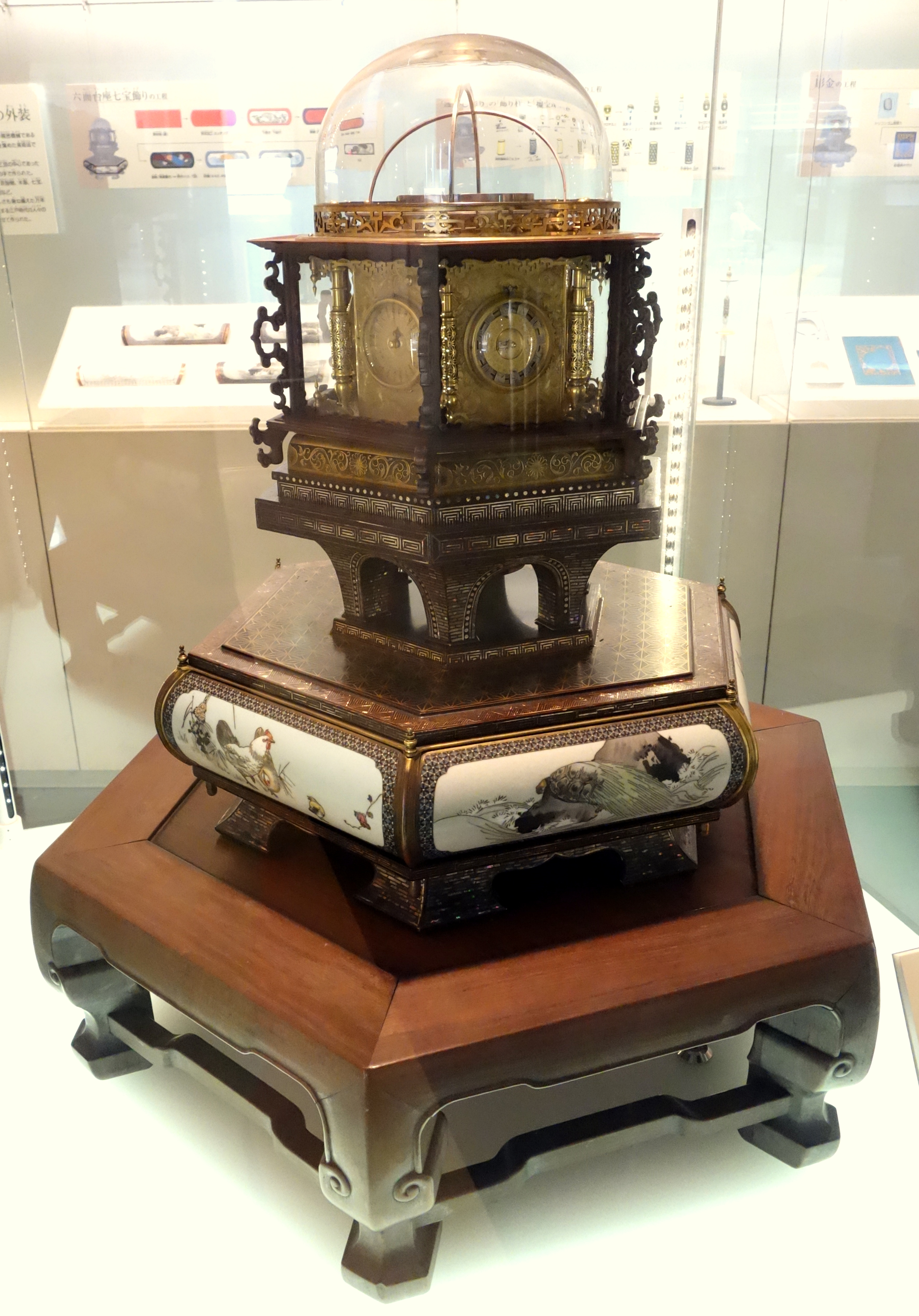
Tanaka Hisashige's 1851 perpetual clock, in the National Science Museum.

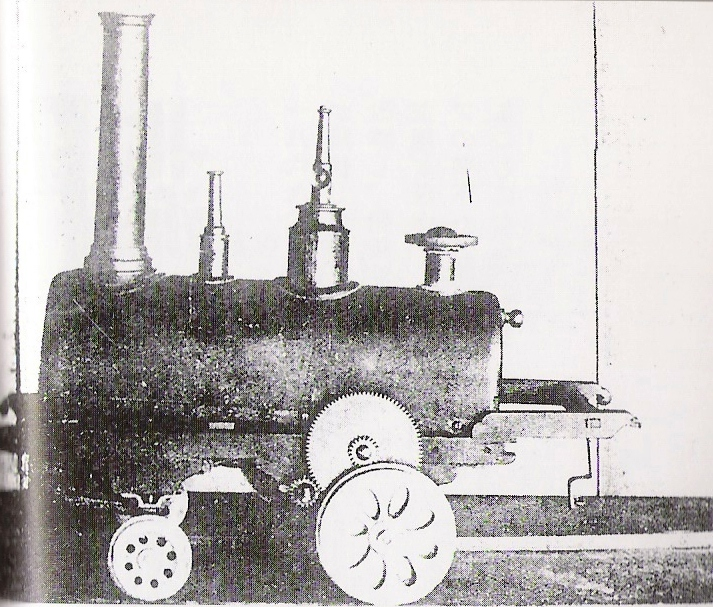
Japan's first steam engine, manufactured in 1853 by Tanaka.
