= Karakuri puppet =

Traditional Japanese puppet

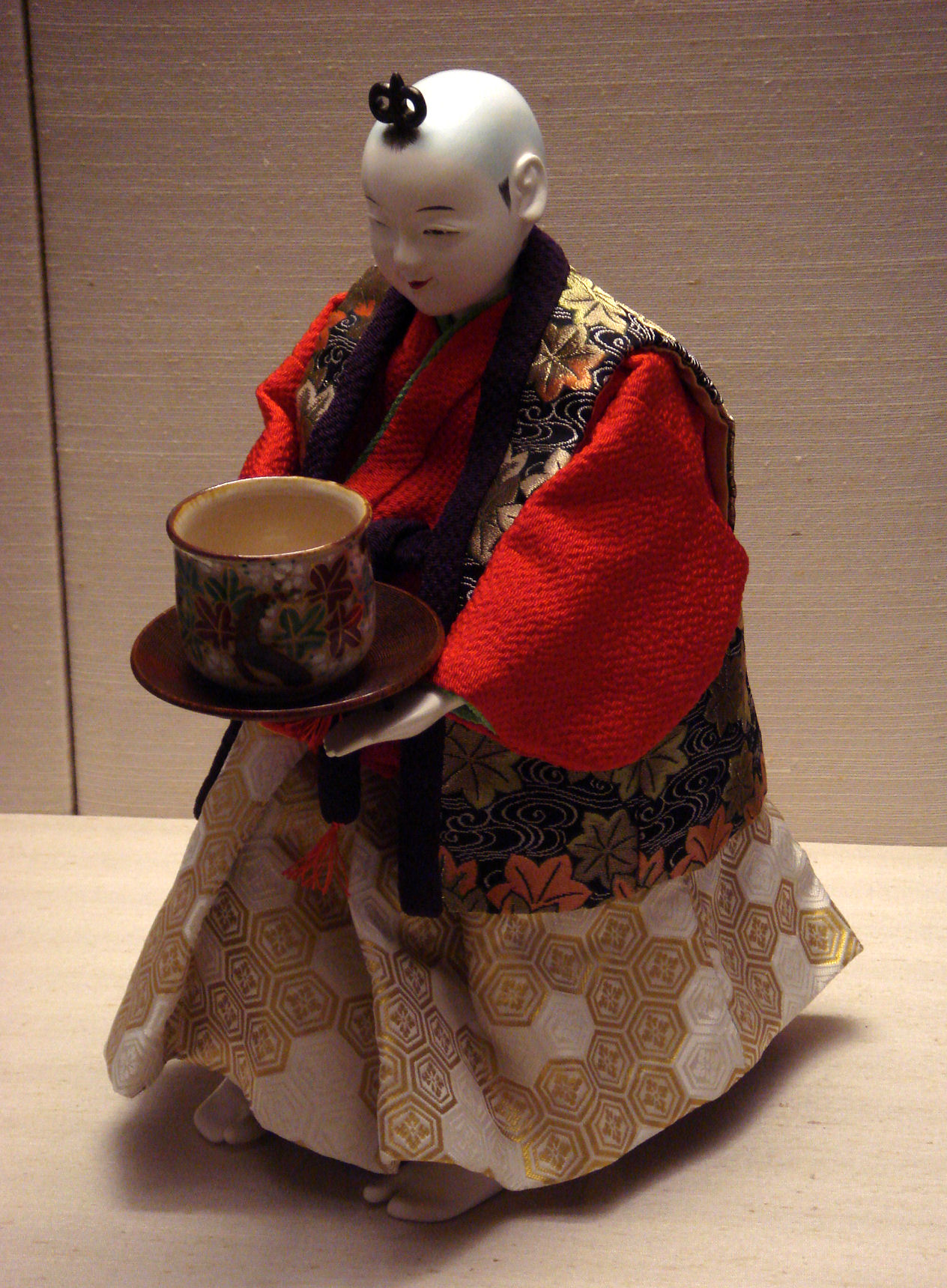
A karakuri automaton, c. 1800, British Museum

Karakuri puppets (からくり人形, karakuri ningyō) are traditional Japanese mechanized puppets or automata, made from the 17th century to the 19th century. The dolls' gestures provided a form of entertainment. The word karakuri has also come to mean "mechanisms" or "trick" in Japanese. It is used to describe any device that evokes a sense of awe through concealment of its inner workings.

The name karakuri is thought to come from the Japanese verb karakuru, which means "to pull, stretch, and move a thread". It is alternatively written in kanji as 絡繰り, 絡繰, 機巧, 機関, and archaically as 唐繰.

== History ==
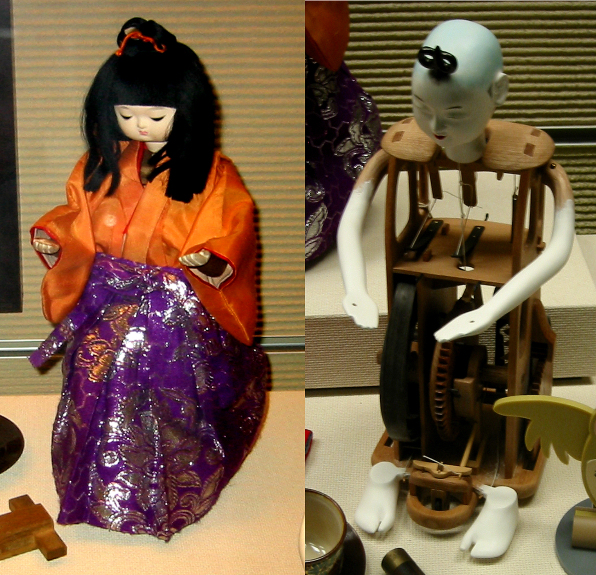
Tea-serving karakuri, with mechanism, 19th century. National Museum of Nature and Science, Tokyo.

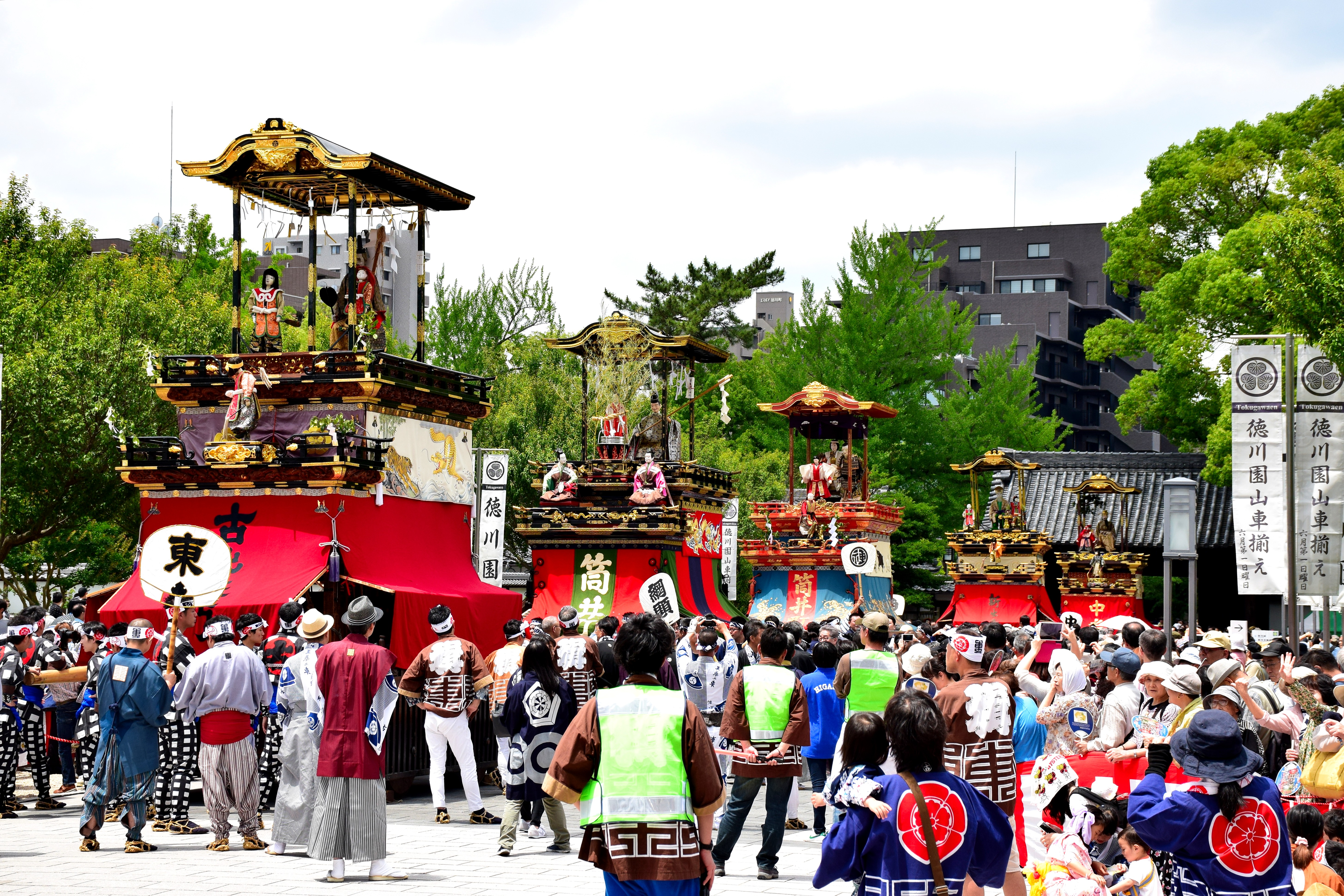
Dashi karakuri of the Tsutsui-chō/Dekimachi tennōsai in Nagoya

One of the earliest recorded references in Japan to similar automata devices is found in the Nihon Shoki, which references a mechanism known as a south-pointing chariot appearing during the reign of Empress Kōgyoku, in 658 CE.

Karakuri were further developed in Japan after the introduction of European clock-making technology sometime in the early 17th century, during the Sengoku period. The gears and cams used in clock-making were used to create moving dolls. The country embraced the mechanized puppet performance as a form of entertainment, and it became popular during the Edo period, which was considered the golden age of karakuri construction and use.

Karakuri were initially only known to upper-class Japanese, such as kuge and daimyo, as the only members of society wealthy enough to afford them. However, karakuri gained widespread popularity through their use as part of floats during street festivals, such as the Toshogu Matsuri in Nagoya.

In 1662, clockmaker Takeda Omi completed the first butai karakuri, karakuri designed for stage performances, in the Dōtonbori neighborhood of Osaka. He then built several of these large puppets for theatrical exhibitions, and the theatre was passed down through several generations of his family.

In the 19th century, Tanaka Hisashige, the founder of Toshiba, gained a reputation by making technically sophisticated karakuri puppets. His masterpieces are Yumi-hiki-doji (arrow-shooting boy) and Moji-kaki doll (letter-writing doll). In the case of Yumi-hiki, using mechanical power, a puppet shoots a target with a bow and arrow, and in the case of Moji-kaki, a puppet dips a brush into ink and writes characters on paper.

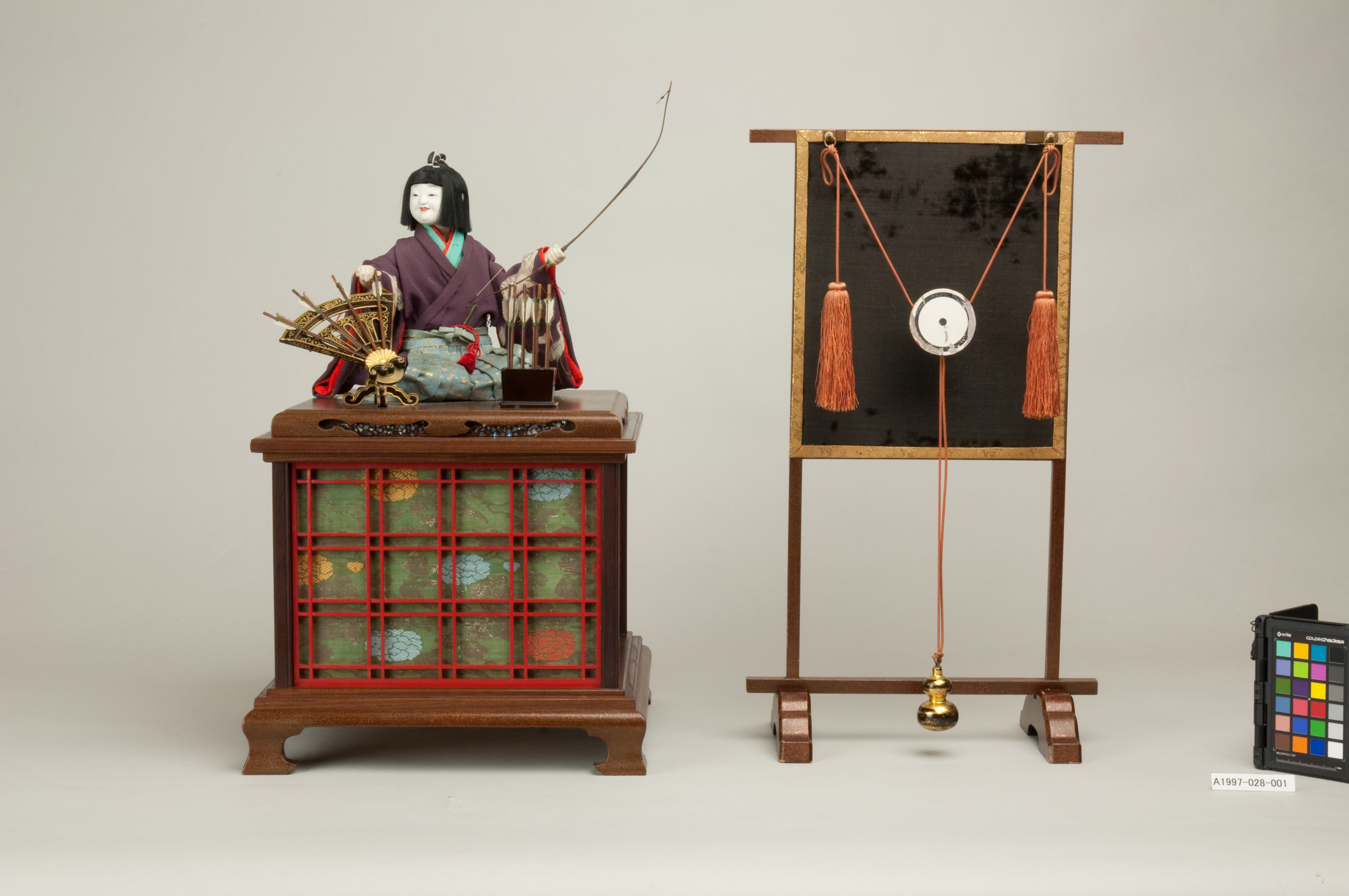
Yumi-Hiki Doji made by Tanaka Hisashige.

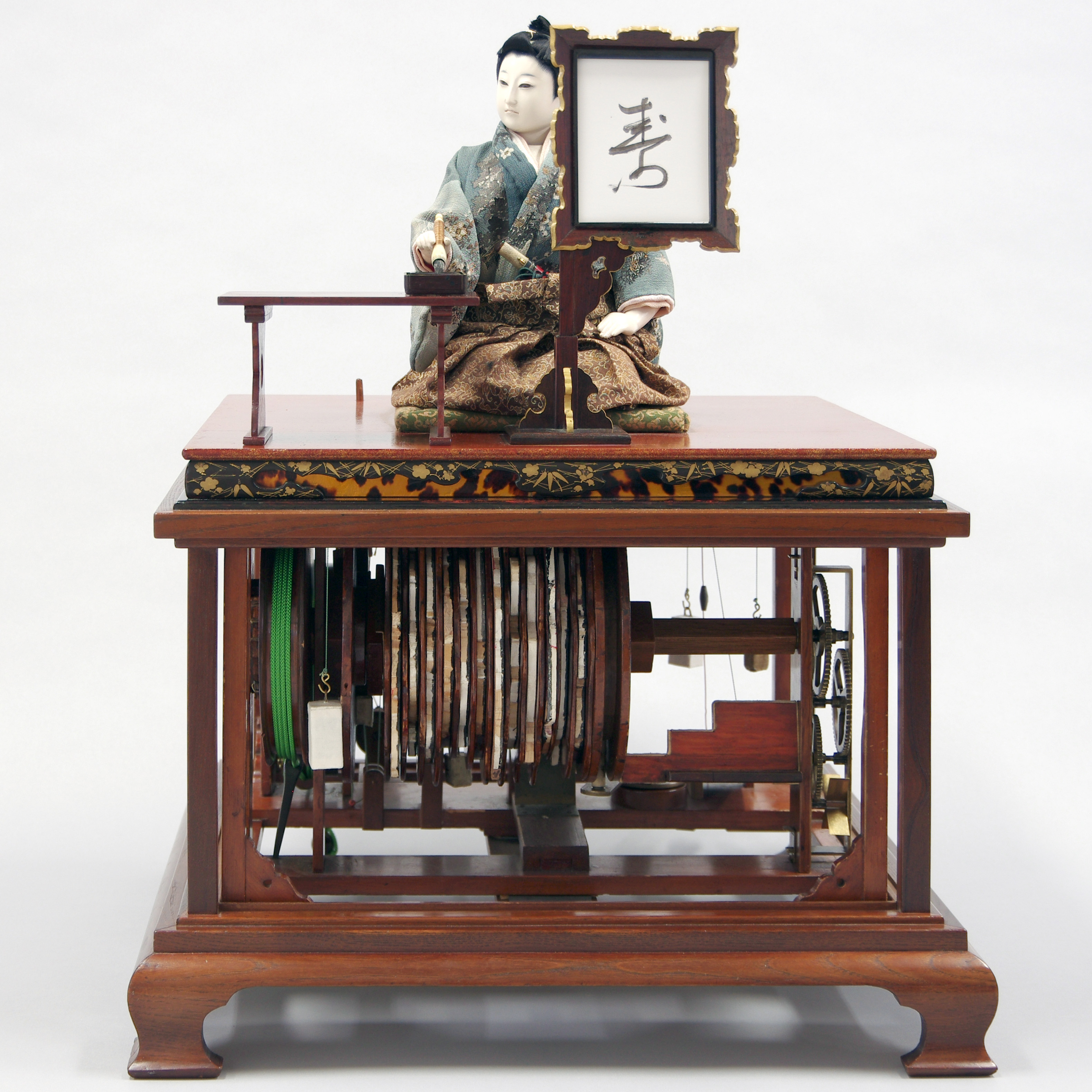
Moji-kaki doll made by Tanaka Hisashige.

According to Kirsty Boyle, a student of one of the last karakuri puppet masters in Japan, the karakuri tradition focuses on the art of concealing technology with the belief that it would evoke feelings and emotions more effectively. It is also noted that, although the karakuri puppet resembles the human figure, it has a form of decisive movement that features rapid shifts that cannot be captured by the naked eye.

== Types ==
There are three main types of karakuri. Butai karakuri (舞台からくり, stage karakuri) were life-sized dolls designed for public performances such as theatres. Zashiki karakuri (座敷からくり, tatami room karakuri) were small and used in homes. Most of them were set on a table and performed a dance or beat drums, but some were designed to serve tea or sake. These were significantly expensive, and usually owned by a daimyo or other high-status person. Dashi karakuri (山車からくり, festival car karakuri) were large mechanical dolls used in religious festivals, where the puppets were used to perform reenactments of traditional myths and legends.

There were also more inexpensive toys based on traditional karakuri. The tin toys that for a period were frequently made in Japan and sold for export were sometimes modeled after karakuri.

Some scholars note that the gestures and movements of the karakuri have influenced Noh, kabuki and bunraku theatre.

=== Zashiki karakuri ===
The most common example today of a zashiki karakuri mechanism is a tea-serving robot, which starts moving forward when a cup of tea is placed on the plate in its hands. This karakuri, also known as chahakobi, was used in a situation when a host wanted to treat a guest in a recreational way. It moves in a straight line for a set distance, moving its feet as if walking, and then bows its head. The doll stops when the cup is removed. When it is replaced, the robot raises its head, turns around and returns to where it came from. It is typically powered by a wound spring made of whalebone, and the actions are controlled by a set of cams and levers.

== Gallery ==
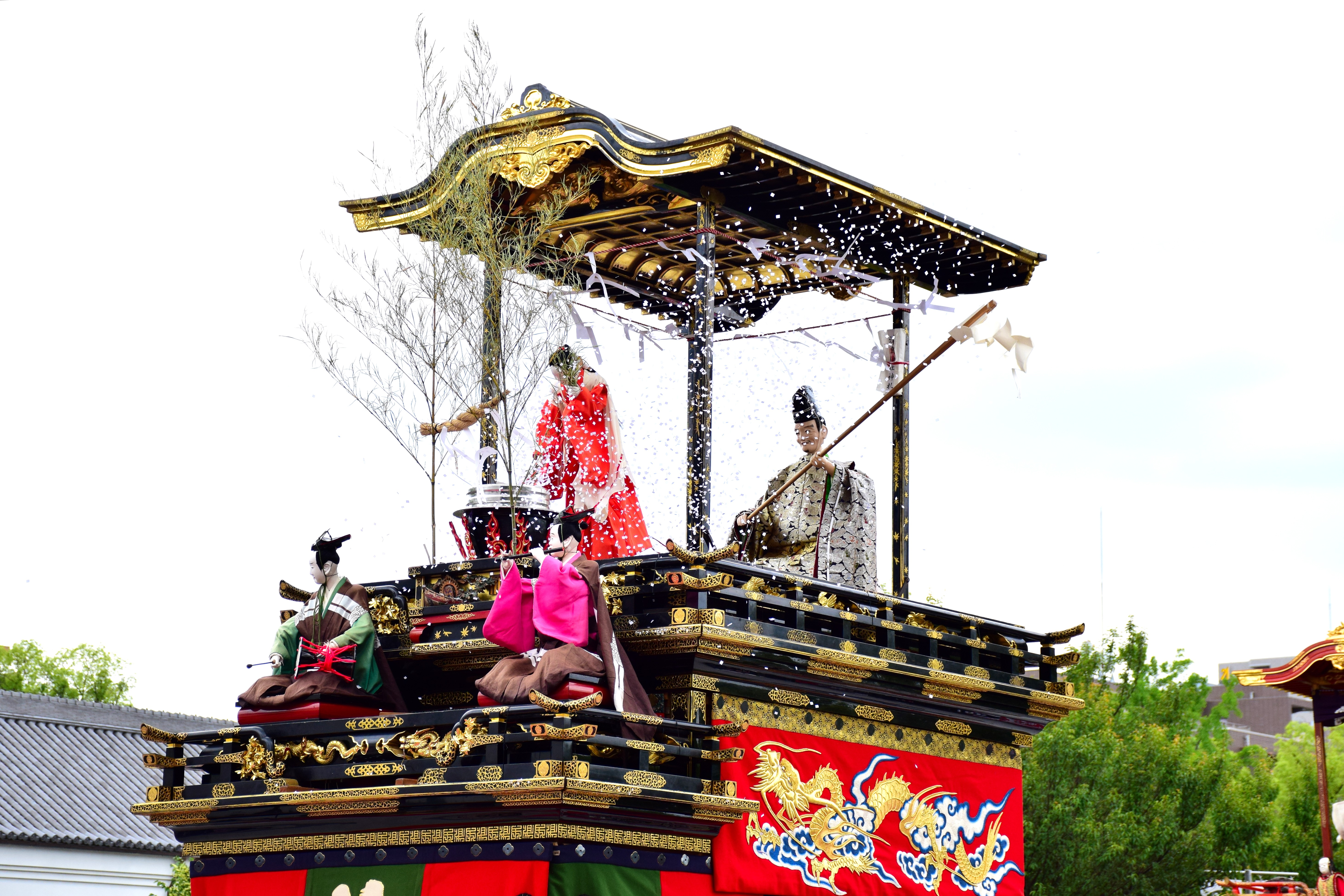
Dashi karakuri of the Tsutsui-chō/Dekimachi tennōsai in Nagoya

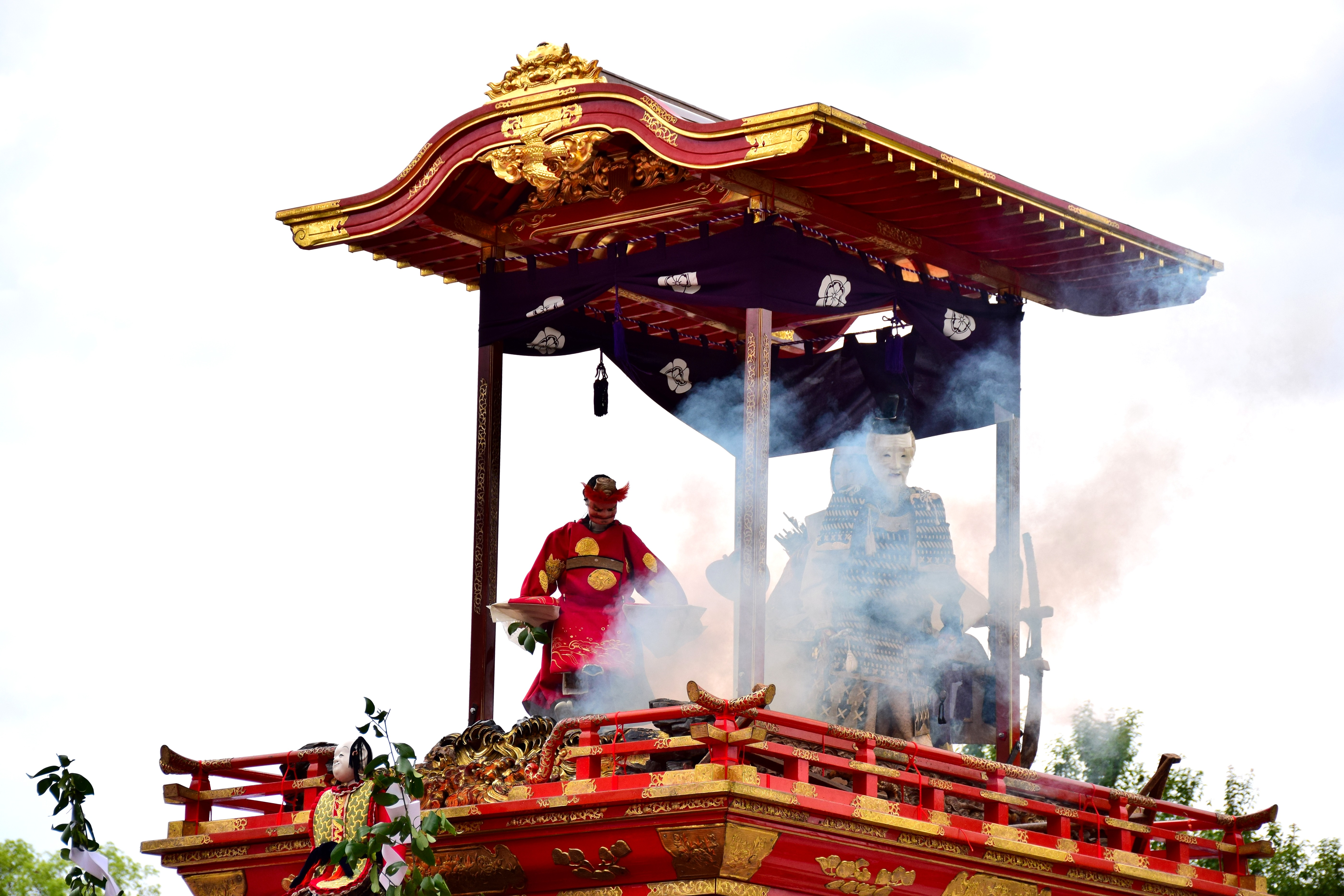

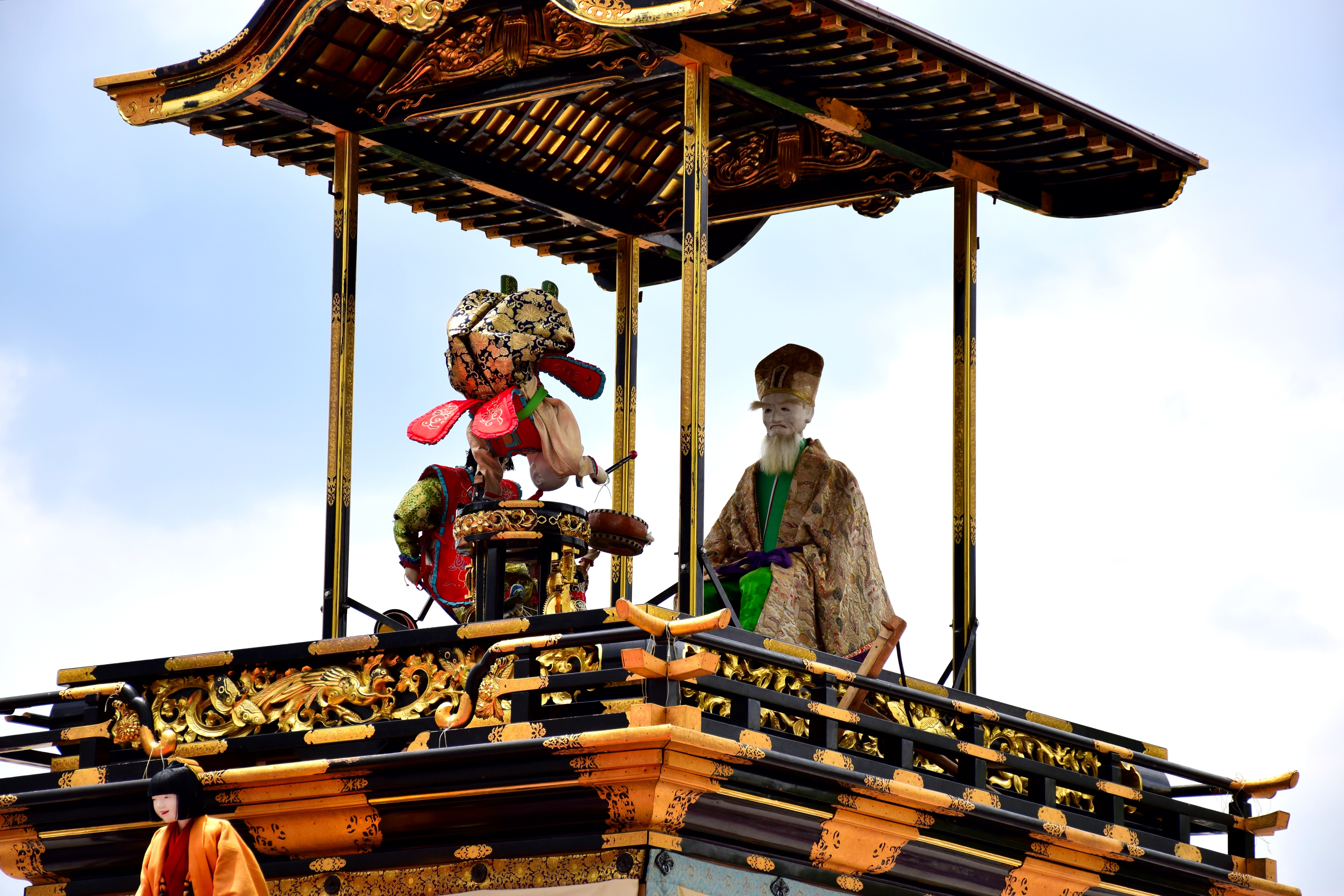

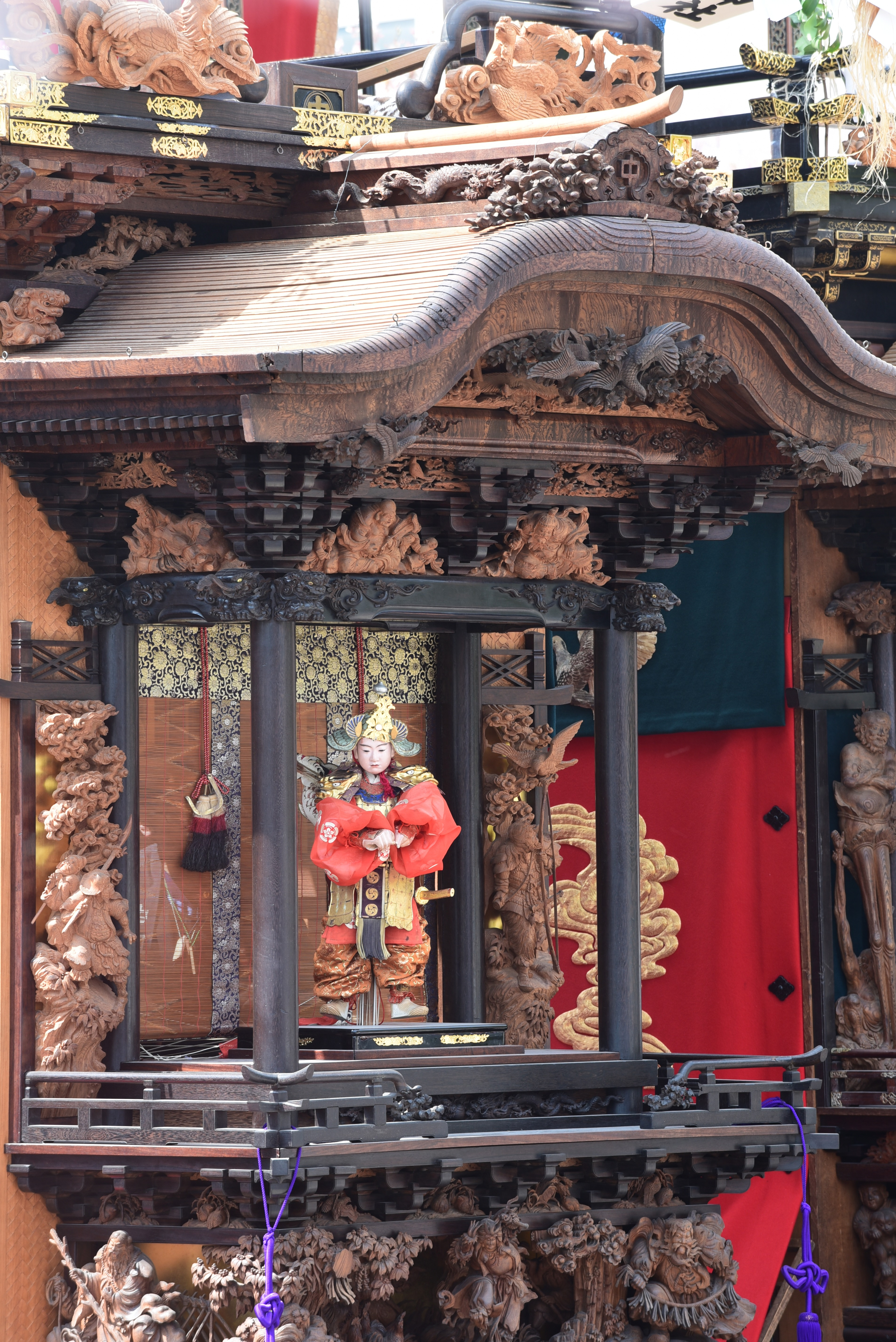
Shimohanda Festival in Handa

== See also ==
- Animatronic
- Automaton
- Gakutensoku
- Japanese robotics
- Tanaka Hisashige
