= History of Japanese Americans =

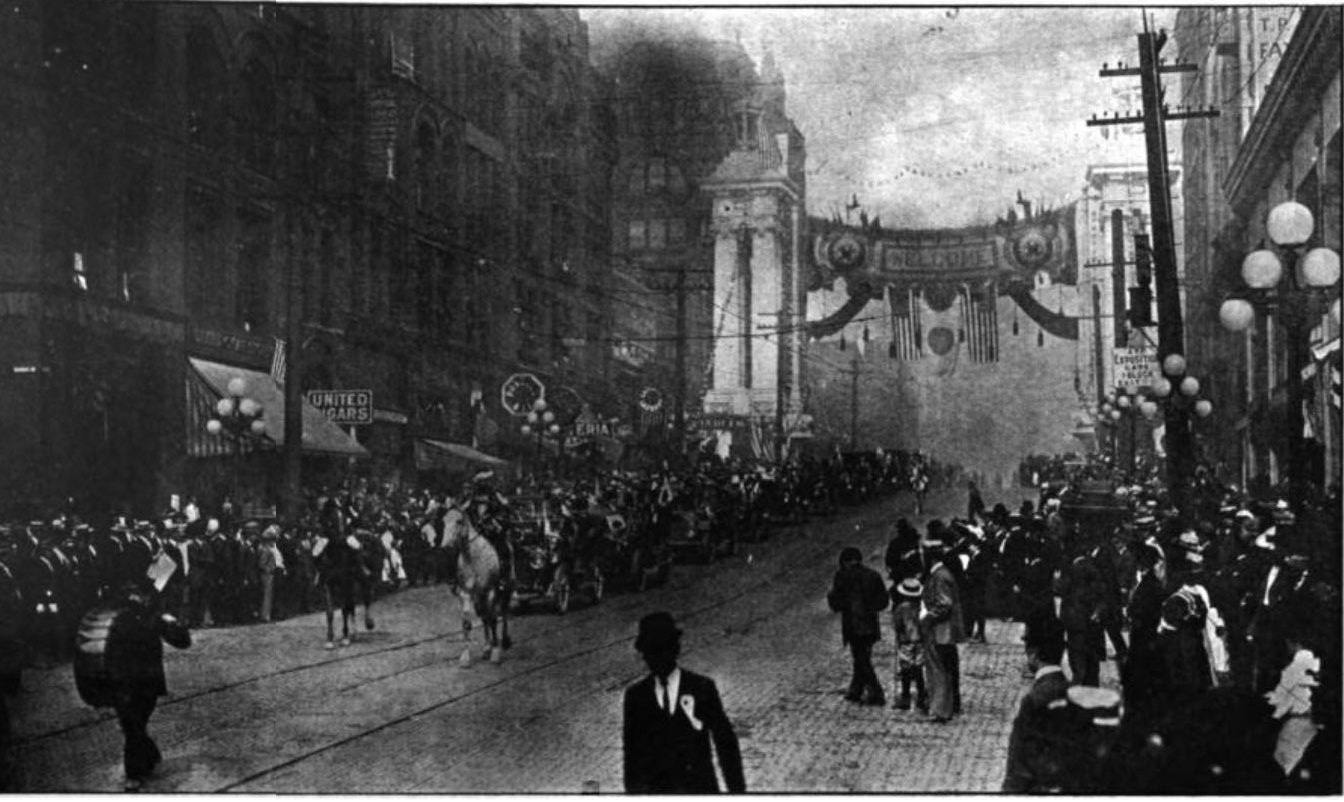
Japanese Day parade in Seattle, during the Alaska–Yukon–Pacific Exposition of 1909

Japanese American history is the history of Japanese Americans or the history of ethnic Japanese in the United States. People from Japan began immigrating to the U.S. in significant numbers following the political, cultural, and social changes stemming from the 1868 Meiji Restoration. Large-scale Japanese immigration started with immigration to Hawaii during the first year of the Meiji period in 1868.

== Japanese American history before World War II ==
=== Immigration ===
There is evidence to suggest that the first Japanese individual to land in North America was a young boy accompanying Franciscan friar, Martín Ignacio de Loyola, in October 1587, on Loyola's second circumnavigation trip around the world. Japanese castaway Oguri Jukichi was among the first Japanese citizens known to have reached present day California (1815), while Otokichi and two fellow castaways reached present day Washington state (1834).

Japan emerged from isolation following Commodore Matthew Perry’s expedition to Japan, where he successfully negotiated a treaty opening Japan to American trade. Further developments included the start of direct shipping between San Francisco and Japan in 1855 and established official diplomatic relations in 1860.

=== Early Labor Migration ===
Historians have often portrayed the early Japanese labor migrations of the Meiji period as a national project and a heroic challenge by pioneers. However, recent research has revealed that many of these early journeys were accidental, unregulated, and initiated by foreign businessmen rather than the Japanese government or the immigrants themselves. These examples show that the origins of Japanese overseas migration were far more chaotic and full of contingency than the neat and tidy story that was later told.

The first large-scale Japanese expedition occurred in 1868, when Yokohama-based American merchant Eugene Van Reed recruited and sent over 140 Japanese laborers to work on plantations in the Kingdom of Hawai'i. These men, known as the Gannenmono (first-year workers), are often remembered as the starting point of Japanese overseas labor. In the same year, Van Reed also arranged for the transport of 42 Japanese laborers to Guam, which was under Spanish rule rule. These efforts were carried out during the turbulent transition from the Tokugawa Shogunate to the Meiji government, and the new government in Tokyo was unaware that these laborers had been taken overseas. Some of the laborers were ultimately rescued by foreign ships and returned home.

Another early example often celebrated in the history of Japanese immigration is the Wakamatsu Colony, established in EI Dorado County, California in 1869. Led by Dutch merchant Henry Schnell, this project is sometimes described as Japan’s first overseas colonial endeavor. However, the settlement quickly failed, and Schnell abandoned the Japanese participants, demonstrating how arbitrary and accidental the attempt was. Historical sources do not support the idea that they were originally from Aizu-Wakamatsu, as is often claimed. It is possible that they were persuaded or deceived into leaving Japan without formal procedures during the chaos of the Meiji Restoration.

There is no evidence that Japanese workers voluntarily embarked on overseas labor migration during the first fifteen years of the Meiji era. Passport records indicate that most overseas travelers were employed by foreign employers, geisha and prostitutes accompanying foreign clients, or domestic servants employed by Westerners in the settlements. While the Meiji government did not officially prohibit migration, as is commonly believed, the authorities at the time were highly wary of abuses similar to the widespread trafficking of Chinese coolies in treaty ports. Consequently, for over a decade, the government responded harshly to foreign attempts to recruit and transport large numbers of Japanese laborers.

A major turning point came in 1885, when the Japanese government, under an agreement with the Kingdom of Kingdom of Hawai’i, approved the dispatch of approximately 2,000 contract laborers (kanyaku imin) to Hawai’i. These contracted laborers were expected to return home after a set period of time, and were considered “dekasegi” (working abroad) rather than permanent residents. This concept laid the foundation for future Japanese migration to Hawai’i and the American mainland, and early experiences led to discrimination, exclusion, and an unexpected shift from temporary labor to permanent settlement.

These early experiences also highlighted the need for clearer regulations and government oversight, which later shaped Japan’s more organized emigration policies.

=== Economic Motivations and the Rise of Mass Migration ===
Japanese immigration to the United States was mostly economically motivated. Stagnating economic conditions causing poor living conditions and high unemployment pushed Japanese people to search elsewhere for a better life. Japan's population density had increased from 1,335 per square ri in 1872 to 1,885 in 1903, intensifying economic pressure on working class populations. Rumors of better standards of living in the "land of promise" encouraged a rise in immigration to the US, especially by younger sons who (due in large part to the Japanese practice of primogeniture) were motivated to independently establish themselves abroad. Only fifty-five Japanese were recorded as living in the United States in 1870, but by 1890 there had been more than two thousand new arrivals.

The Chinese Exclusion Act of 1882 had a significant impact for Japanese immigration, as it left room for 'cheap labor' and an increasing recruitment of Japanese from both Hawaii and Japan as they sought industrialists to replace Chinese laborers. "Between 1901 and 1908, a time of unrestricted immigration, 127,000 Japanese entered the U.S."

The numbers of new arrivals peaked in 1907 with as many as 30,000 Japanese immigrants counted (economic and living conditions were particularly bad in Japan at this point as a result of the Russo-Japanese War of 1904–5). Japanese immigrants who moved to mainland U.S. settled on the West Coast primarily in California.

=== Anti-Japanese sentiment ===
Nonetheless, there was a history of legalized discrimination in American immigration laws which heavily restricted Japanese immigration. As the number of Japanese in the United States increased, resentment against their success in the farming industry and fears of a "yellow peril" grew into an anti-Japanese movement similar to that faced by earlier Chinese immigrants.

Increased pressure from the Asiatic Exclusion League and the San Francisco Board of Education forced President Roosevelt to negotiate the Gentlemen's Agreement with Japan in 1907. It was agreed that Japan would stop issuing valid passports for the U.S. This agreement was intended to curtail Japanese immigration to the U.S., but Japanese women were still allowed to immigrate if they were the wives of U.S. residents. Prior to 1908, about seven out of eight ethnic Japanese in the United States were men. By 1924, the ratio had changed to approximately four women to every six men. Japanese immigration to the U.S. effectively ended when Congress passed the Immigration Act of 1924, which banned all but a token few Japanese people.

The ban on immigration produced unusually well-defined generational groups within the Japanese American community. Initially, there was an immigrant generation, the Issei, and their U.S.-born children, the Nisei Japanese American. The Issei were exclusively those who had immigrated before 1924. Because no new immigrants were permitted, all Japanese Americans born after 1924 were—by definition—born in the US. This generation, the Nisei, became a distinct cohort from the Issei generation in terms of age, citizenship, and English language ability, in addition to the usual generational differences. Institutional and interpersonal racism led many of the Nisei to marry other Nisei, resulting in a third distinct generation of Japanese Americans, the Sansei.

It was only in 1952 that the Senate and House voted on the McCarran-Walter Act, which allowed Japanese immigrants to become naturalized U.S. citizens. But significant Japanese immigration did not occur again until the Immigration Act of 1965, which ended 40 years of bans against immigration from Japan and other countries.

== Farming ==
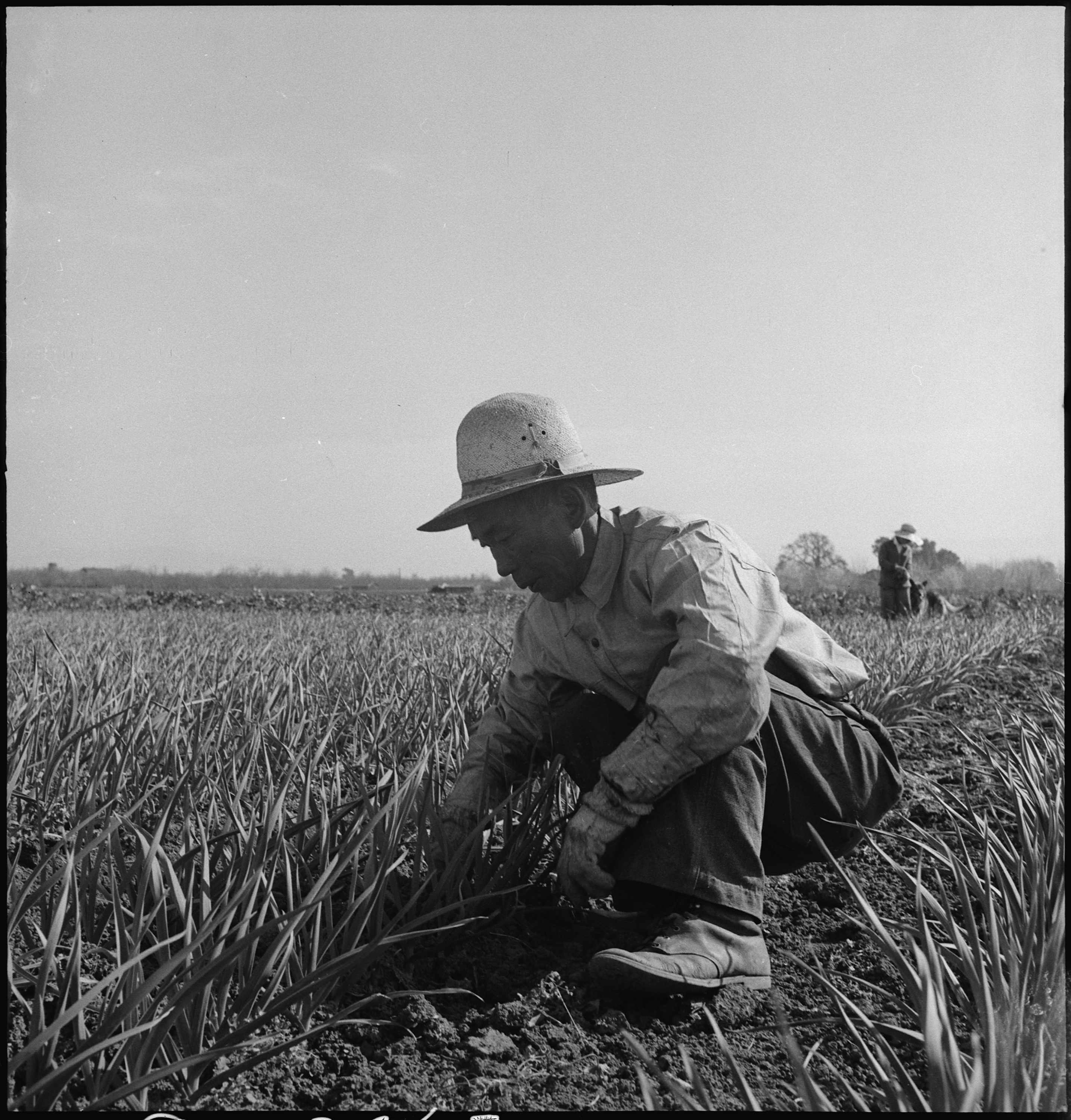
Japanese American farmer in Mountain View, California.

Japanese-Americans have made significant contributions to agricultural development in Western-Pacific parts of the United States.

Similar to European American settlers, the Issei, the majority of whom were young adult males, immigrated to America searching for better economic conditions and the majority settled in Western Pacific states settling for manual labor jobs in various industries such as ‘railroad, cannery and logging camp laborers. The Japanese workforce were diligent and extremely hardworking, inspired to earn enough money to return and retire in Japan. Consequently, this collective ambition enabled the Issei to work in agriculture as tenant farmers fairly promptly and by "1909 approximately 30,000 Japanese laborers worked in the Californian agriculture". This transition occurred relatively smoothly due to a strong inclination to work in agriculture which had always been an occupation that had been looked upon with respect in Japan.

Progress was made by the Issei in agriculture despite struggles faced cultivating the land, including harsh environment problems such as harsh weather and persistent issues with grasshoppers. Economic difficulties and discriminating socio-political pressures such as the anti-alien laws (see California Alien Land Law of 1913) were further obstacles. Nevertheless, second-generation Nisei were not impacted by these laws as a result of being legal American citizens, therefore their important roles in West Coast agriculture persisted Japanese immigrants brought a sophisticated knowledge of cultivation, including knowledge of soils, fertilizers, skills in land reclamation, irrigation, and drainage. This knowledge combined with Japanese traditional culture respecting the soil and hard work, led to successful cultivation of crops on previously marginal lands. According to sources, by 1941 Japanese Americans "were producing between thirty and thirty-five per cent by value of all commercial truck crops grown in California as well as occupying a dominant position in the distribution system of fruits and vegetables."

The role of Issei in agriculture prospered in the early twentieth century. It was only in the event of the Internment of Japanese Americans in 1942 that many lost their agricultural businesses and farms. Although this was the case, Japanese Americans remain involved in these industries today, particularly in southern California and to some extent, Arizona by the areas' year-round agricultural economy, and descendants of Japanese pickers who adapted farming in Oregon and Washington state. Agriculture also played a key role during the internment of Japanese Americans. World War II internment camps, were located in desolate spots such as Poston, in the Arizona desert, and Tule Lake, California, at a dry mountain lake bed. Agricultural programs were put in place at relocation centers with the aim of growing food for direct consumption by inmates. There was also a less important aim of cultivating 'war crops' for the war effort. Agriculture in internment camps was faced with multiple challenges such as harsh weather and climate conditions. However, on the most part the agricultural programs were a success mainly due to inmate knowledge and interest in agriculture. Due to their tenacious efforts, these farm lands remain active today.

By the 1930s the ethnic Japanese population living in Seattle had reached 8,448, out of a total city population of 368,583 meaning that, "Japanese were Seattle’s largest non-white group, and the fourth-largest group behind several European nationalities." Prior to World War II, Seattle's Nihonmachi had become the second largest Japantown on the West Coast of North America. East of Lake Washington, Japanese immigrant labor helped clear recently logged land to make it suitable to support small scale farming on leased plots. During the 20th century, the Japanese farming community became increasingly well established. Prior to World War II, some 90 percent of the agricultural workforce on the "Eastside" was of Japanese ancestry, also 90% of produce sold at the Pike Place market in Seattle were from the Japanese-American farms from Bellevue and the White river valley.

== Internment ==
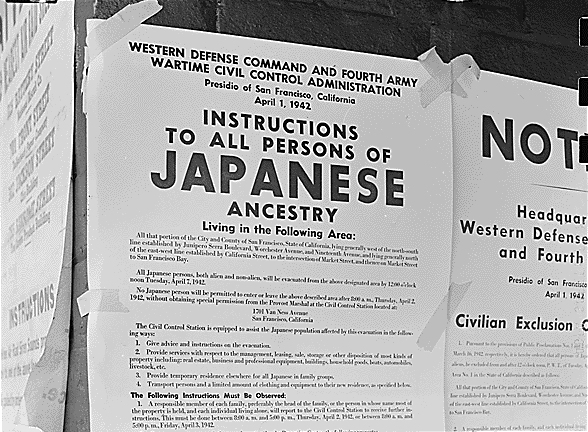
Posted Japanese American Exclusion Order

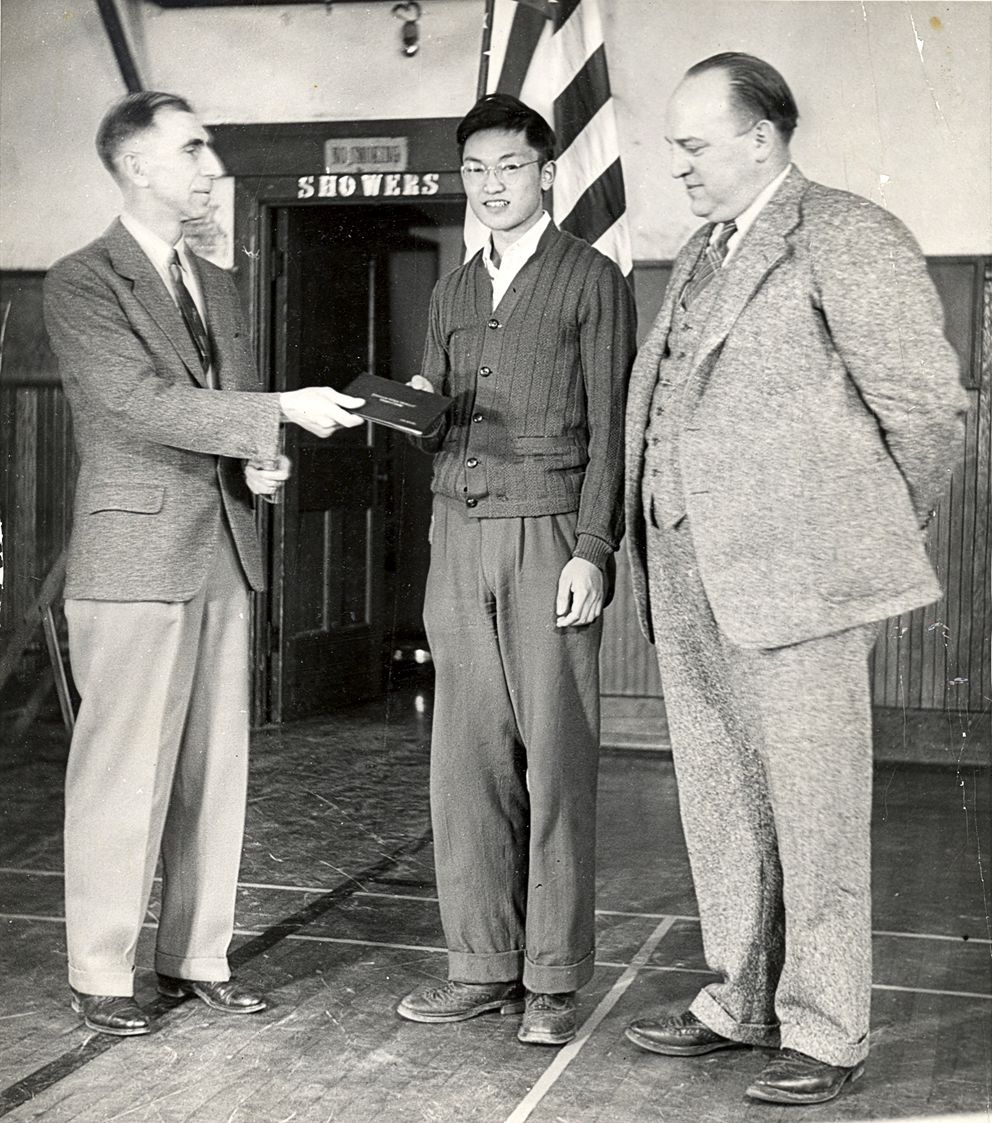
Juneau High School valedictorian John Tanaka received his diploma at a special graduation ceremony at the school's gymnasium in Juneau, Alaska in April 1942 prior to his internment. He was unable to attend actual graduation the next month due to evacuation orders.

During World War II, an estimated 120,000 Japanese Americans and Japanese nationals or citizens residing in the United States were forcibly interned in ten different camps across the US, mostly in the west. The Internment was a "system of legalized racial oppression" and was based on the race or ancestry rather than activities of the interned. Families, including children, were interned together. Each member of the family was allowed to bring two suitcases of their belongings. Each family, regardless of its size, was given one room to live in. The camps were fenced in and patrolled by armed guards. For the most part, the internees remained in the camps until the end of the war, when they left the camps to rebuild their lives.

== World War II service ==
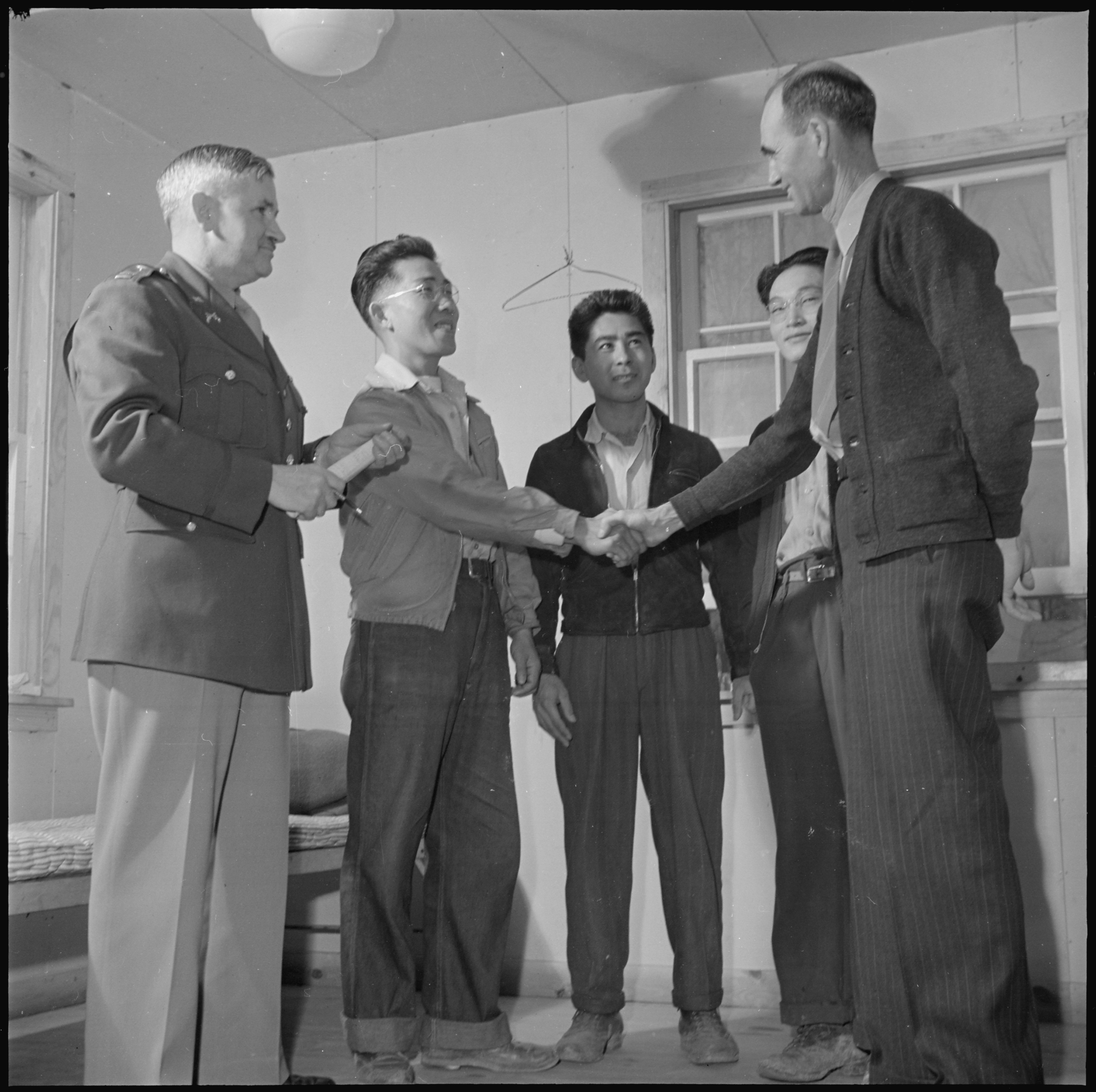
Rohwer Director Ray Johnston congratulates George Kiwashima on his decision to volunteer in the United States Army, while Captain John Holbrook and two other Japanese-American volunteers look on.

Many Japanese Americans served with great distinction during World War II in the American forces.

Nebraska Nisei Ben Kuroki became a famous Japanese-American soldier of the war after he completed 30 missions as a gunner on B-24 Liberators with the 93rd Bombardment Group in Europe. When he returned to the US he was interviewed on radio and made numerous public appearances, including one at San Francisco's Commonwealth Club where he was given a ten-minute standing ovation after his speech. Kuroki's acceptance by the California businessmen was the turning point in attitudes toward Japanese on the West Coast. Kuroki volunteered to fly on a B-29 crew against his parents' homeland and was the only Nisei to fly missions over Japan. He was awarded a belated Distinguished Service Medal by President George W. Bush in August 2005.

The 442nd Regimental Combat Team/100th Infantry Battalion is the most highly decorated unit in U.S. military history. Composed of Japanese Americans, the 442nd/100th fought valiantly in the European Theater. The 522nd Nisei Field Artillery Battalion was one of the first units to liberate the prisoners of the Nazi concentration camp at Dachau. Hawaiʻi Senator Daniel Inouye was a veteran of the 442nd. Additionally the Military Intelligence Service consisted of Japanese Americans who served in the Pacific Front.

On October 5, 2010, Congress approved the granting of the Congressional Gold Medal to the 442nd Regimental Combat Team and the 100th Infantry Battalion, as well as the 6,000 Japanese Americans who served in the Military Intelligence Service during the war.

== World War II and immediate Postwar Period ==
=== Postwar Marriages and Early Public Perceptions ===
After World War II, many Japanese women married foreign servicemen, particularly American soldiers stationed in Japan during the occupation from 1945 to1952. These women would later be called “Japanese war brides.” As the presence of American soldiers expanded, especially around military bases and urban areas, daily contact between soldiers and civilians increased. Some of this contact led to marriages, and many women later moved overseas, mainly to the United States.

In Japanese society immediately after the war, war brides were often the subject of suspicion and criticism. With strong feelings toward the former enemy still lingering, marriage to a foreign soldier was often seen as crossing social and moral lines. In public discourse and media representations, they were often portrayed not as individuals making personal choices, but as symbols of the social unrest brought about by defeat and occupation.

=== Media Portrayals and Victim Narratives ===
From the late 1940s to the 1950s, newspapers and magazines often portrayed war brides alongside women involved with American soldiers, known as “panpan.” This portrayal blurred the distinction between the two and reinforced moral criticism. Reports often emphasized appearance, behavior, and gossip, and war brides were often portrayed as women who had abandoned traditional Japanese values.

After Japan regained sovereignty in 1952 and press restrictions were lifted, a narrative portraying war brides as “victims” gained momentum. The media portrayed American husbands as violent or irresponsible, and Japanese women as ignorant and tragic, with stories of their lives being ruined by their marriages. These images were repeated not only in newspapers but also in films and popular literature.

Although happy marriages were occasionally reported, they were treated as the exception. Overall, stories of failed marriages, cultural clashes, loneliness, and social exclusion continued to be emphasized. As a result, media coverage tended to emphasize negative images of war brides, while the diversity of their actual experiences received less attention.

Media discussions of war brides relied heavily on simplistic labels that reduced individual experiences to a single image. The term “war bride” itself came to represent a stereotype detached from real life experiences. They were often portrayed as a homogenous group, rather than as individuals with different backgrounds, motivations, and outcomes. This generalization made it easier for the media to attach moral judgements and emotional narratives.

These representations were also deeply connected to the behavioral and sexual norms of women in postwar Japanese society. As Japan attempted to reconstruct the moral order after the war, relationships between Japanese women and foreign men became a source of anxiety. War brides were used symbolically in debates about female chastity, loyalty, and responsibility. Public discussion mainly focused on women’s behavior, especially their morality and sexuality.

Furthermore, when the media covered life after migration, they tended to paint a vague and speculative picture. They tended to emphasize cultural clashes, isolation, and failure, while giving limited attention to the diversity of individual experiences. As a result, leaving Japan, especially to marry a foreigner, was portrayed as inevitably bringing hardship and a loss of identity.

Through the repetition of these cases, the media created a limited and enduring image of war brides that continued to influence how they were spoken about in Japan for decades to come.

=== Decline in Attention and Later Reassessment ===
In the 1960s, some writers attempted to present a more balanced portrayal of war brides, portraying them as strong women who supported their families despite the challenges of living in a different culture, but this did not significantly change public perceptions. Newspaper coverage continued to favor dramatic stories of divorce, crime, and isolation abroad.

In the 1970s, public interest in war brides waned. As memories of the occupation faded, they received less media attention. When they were mentioned, they were often portrayed as not fully part of Japanese society because they had been away from Japan for so long.

Since the late 1980s, a movement has emerged led by war brides themselves and their supporters to revise the conventional stereotype of war brides. They have emphasized their role as a cultural bridge between Japan and the United States and their experiences of building families across borders. While this reevaluation comes long after the end of the war, it marks a shift away from exclusionary views.

=== Historical Significance ===
The history of Japanese war brides reflects the role of social attitudes and media representations in shaping public memory. For many years, they have been portrayed as symbols of moral decadence and tragedy. These representations reflected broader concerns in postwar Japanese society about gender roles, national identity, and social belonging.

== Post–World War II and redress ==
In the U.S., the right to redress is defined as a constitutional right, as it is decreed in the First Amendment to the Constitution.

Redress may be defined as follows:

n. 1. the setting right of what is wrong: redress of abuses. 2. relief from wrong or injury. 3. compensation or satisfaction from a wrong or injury.

Reparation is defined as:

n. 1. the making of amends for wrong or injury done: reparation for an injustice. 2. Usually, reparations. compensation in money, material, labor, etc., payable by a defeated country to another country or to an individual for loss suffered during or as a result of war. 3. restoration to good condition. 4. repair.

The campaign for redress against internment was launched by Japanese Americans in 1978. The Japanese American Citizens' League (JACL) asked for three measures to be taken as redress: $25,000 to be awarded to each person who was detained, an apology from Congress acknowledging publicly that the U.S. government had been wrong, and the release of funds to set up an educational foundation for the children of Japanese American families. Eventually, the Civil Liberties Act of 1988 granted reparations to surviving Japanese-Americans who had been interned by the United States government during World War II and officially acknowledged the "fundamental violations of the basic civil liberties and constitutional rights" of the internment.

Under the 2001 budget of the United States, it was decreed that the ten sites on which the detainee camps were set up are to be preserved as historical landmarks: "places like Manzanar, Tule Lake, Heart Mountain, Topaz, Amache, Jerome, and Rohwer will forever stand as reminders that this nation failed in its most sacred duty to protect its citizens against prejudice, greed, and political expediency".

=== Community Reconstruction and Social Advancement after World War II ===
After World War II, Japanese Americans who had experienced wartime internment attempted to rebuild their lives in American society amid continuing discrimination and social exclusion. Many families chose to adapt to American society by refraining from using Japanese language and culture in everyday life, especially in their children’s education, in order to avoid further prejudice.

Since the late 1960s, interest in Japanese American history and identity has grown, particularly among younger generations. In San Francisco and the surrounding area, various educational and community activities have been launched to support Japanese Americans and preserve their cultural heritage. One example is the Japanese Bilingual Bicultural Program (JBBP), a public school program established in 1973 that provides Japanese language education and Japanese cultural experiences in the San Francisco Unified School District.

In addition to formal education, informal social education also played an important role in community rebuilding. Founded in the early 1970s, the Northern California Japanese Cultural and Community Center (JCCCNC) offered cultural, educational, and social programs for Japanese Americans as well as for the local community. Religious organizations, such as Buddhist temples and Christian churches, also served as important spaces for interaction, Japanese language learning, and the perpetuation of cultural traditions through regular activities and events.

Through these educational programs and community activities, Japanese Americans sought to maintain their cultural identity, foster Japanese American pride among younger generations, and strengthen ties within the Japanese American community in the postwar period.

== Timeline ==
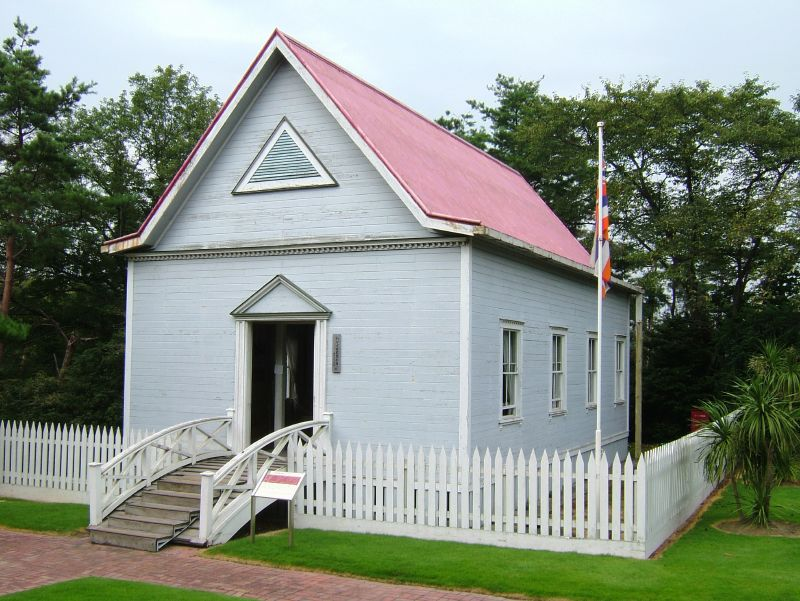
The Hilo Japanese Immigrant's Assembly Hall. Built in 1889, today located in Meiji-mura museum, Japan.

There is evidence to suggest that the first Japanese individual to land in North America was a young boy accompanying Franciscan friar, Martín Ignacio Loyola, in October 1587, on Loyola's second circumnavigation trip around the world. Tanaka Shōsuke visited North America in 1610 and 1613. Japanese castaway Oguri Jukichi was among the first Japanese citizens known to have reached present day California (1815). Otokichi and two fellow castaways reached present day Washington state (1834).

- 1841: June 27 Captain Whitfield, commanding a New England sailing vessel, rescues five shipwrecked Japanese sailors. Four disembark at Honolulu, however Manjiro Nakahama stays on board returning with Whitfield to Fairhaven, Massachusetts. After attending school in New England and adopting the name John Manjiro, he later became an interpreter for Commodore Matthew C. Perry.
- 1850: Seventeen survivors of a Japanese shipwreck are saved by the American freighter Auckland off the coast of California. In 1852, the group is sent to Macau to join Commodore Matthew C. Perry as a gesture to help open diplomatic relations with Japan. One of them, Joseph Heco (Hikozo Hamada), goes on to become the first Japanese person to become a naturalized American citizen.
- 1861: The utopian minister Thomas Lake Harris of the Brotherhood of the New Life visits England, where he meets Nagasawa Kanaye, who becomes a convert. Nagasawa returns to the U.S. with Harris and follows him to Fountaingrove in Santa Rosa, California. When Harris leaves the Californian commune, Nagasawa became the leader and remained there until his death in 1932.
- 1866: Japanese students arrive in the United States, supported by the Japan Mission of the Reformed Church in America which had opened in 1859 at Kanagawa.
- 1869: A group of Japanese people arrive at Gold Hills, California and build the Wakamatsu Tea and Silk Farm Colony. Okei becomes the first recorded Japanese woman to die and be buried in the United States.
- 1882: The Chinese Exclusion Act of 1882. This arguably left room for agricultural labor, encouraging immigration and recruitment of Japanese from both Hawaii and Japan.
- 1884: The Japanese grants passports for contract labor in Hawaii where there was a demand for cheap labor.
- 1885: On February 8, the first official intake of Japanese migrants to a U.S.-controlled entity occurs when 676 men, 159 women, and 108 children arrive in Honolulu on board the Pacific Mail passenger freighter City of Tokio. These immigrants, the first of many Japanese immigrants to Hawaii, have come to work as laborers on the island's sugar plantations via an assisted passage scheme organized by the Hawaiian government.
- 1886: The Japanese government legalizes emigration.
- 1893: The San Francisco Board of Education attempts to introduce segregation for Japanese American children, but withdraws the measure following protests by the Japanese government.
- 1900s: Japanese immigrants begin to lease land and sharecrop.
- 1902: Yone Noguchi publishes The American Diary of a Japanese Girl, the first Japanese American novel.
- 1903: In Yamataya v. Fisher (Japanese Immigrant Case) the Supreme Court held that Japanese Kaoru Yamataya was subject to deportation since her Fifth Amendments due process was not violated in regards to the appeals process of the 1891 Immigration Act. This allowed for individuals to challenge their deportation in the courts by challenging the legitimacy of the procedures.
- 1906: The San Francisco Board of Education orders the segregation of Asian students in public schools.
- 1907: The Gentlemen's Agreement of 1907 between United States and Japan results in Japan ending the issuance passports for new laborers. Anti-Asian race riots took place in San Francisco took place in May.
- 1908: Japanese "picture brides" enter the United States.
- 1913: The California Alien Land Law of 1913 bans Japanese from purchasing land; whites felt threatened by Japanese success in independent farming ventures.
- 1924: The federal Immigration Act of 1924 banned immigration from Japan.
- 1927: Kinjiro Matsudaira becomes the first Japanese American to be elected mayor of a U.S. city (town of Edmonston, Maryland).
- 1930s: Issei become economically stable for the first time in California and Hawaiʻi.
- 1941: Attack on Pearl Harbor: Imperial Japanese forces attack the United States Navy base at Naval Station Pearl Harbor in Honolulu. Japanese-American community leaders are arrested and detained by federal authorities.
- 1942: President Franklin Delano Roosevelt signs Executive Order 9066 on February 19, beginning Japanese American internment. Over the course of the war, approximately 110,000 Japanese Americans and Japanese who lived on the West Coast of the United States are uprooted from their homes and interned.
- 1942: Japanese American soldiers from Hawaiʻi form the 100th Infantry Battalion of the United States Army in June 1942. Subsequently, the battalion fights in Europe beginning in September 1943. http://encyclopedia.densho.org/100th%20Infantry%20Battalion/
- 1944: Ben Kuroki became the only Japanese-American in the U.S. Army Air Forces to serve in combat operations overseas, both in the European Theater, then in the Pacific Ocean theater of World War II.
- 1944: The U.S. Army 100th Battalion merges with the all-volunteer Japanese American 442nd Regimental Combat Team that was formed with men from Hawaii and the continental U.S. http://encyclopedia.densho.org/442nd%20Regimental%20Combat%20Team/
- 1945: Thirty thousand Japanese Americans were in Japan, unable to return to the United States since the nations were at war.
- 1945: The only Nisei unit of the U.S. Army in Bavaria assists in both the liberation of some of the satellite camps of Dachau, and by May 2, halts the Dachau-Austria death march, saving hundreds of prisoners.
- 1945: By war's end, the 442nd Regimental Combat Team is awarded 18,143 decorations, including 9,486 Purple Hearts, becoming the most decorated military unit in United States history.
- 1947: Wally Kaname Yonamine plays football for the San Francisco 49ers.
- 1947: Wataru Misaka plays basketball for the New York Knicks.
- 1952: The McCarran–Walter Act eliminates race as a basis for naturalization, allowing Issei to become US citizens.
- 1952: Tommy Kono (weightlifting), Yoshinobu Oyakawa (100-meter backstroke), and Ford Konno (1500-meter freestyle) each win gold medals and set records during the Summer Olympics in Helsinki.
- 1957: Miyoshi Umeki wins the Academy Award for Best Supporting Actress.
- 1957: James Kanno is elected as the first mayor of California's Fountain Valley.
- 1959: Daniel K. Inouye is elected to the United States House of Representatives, becoming the first Japanese American to serve in Congress.
- 1962: Minoru Yamasaki is awarded the contract to design the World Trade Center, becoming the first Japanese American architect to design a supertall skyscraper in the United States.
- 1963: Daniel K. Inouye becomes the first Japanese American in the United States Senate.
- 1965: Patsy T. Mink becomes the first woman of color in Congress.
- 1971: Norman Y. Mineta is elected mayor of San Jose, California, becoming the first Asian American mayor of a major U.S. city.
- 1972: Robert A. Nakamura produces Manzanar, the first personal documentary about internment.
- 1974: Fujio Matsuda becomes the first Asian-American president of a major American university, as president of the University of Hawaiʻi.
- 1974: George R. Ariyoshi becomes the first elected Japanese American governor in the State of Hawaiʻi.
- 1976: S. I. Hayakawa of California and Spark Matsunaga of Hawaiʻi become the second and third U.S. Senators of Japanese descent.
- 1977: Michiko (Miki) Gorman wins both the Boston and New York City marathons in the same year. It's her second victory in each race.
- 1978: Ellison S. Onizuka becomes the first Asian American astronaut. Onizuka was one of the seven astronauts to die in the Space Shuttle Challenger disaster in 1986.
- 1980: Congress creates the Commission on Wartime Relocation and Internment of Civilians to investigate internment during World War II.
- 1980: Eunice Sato becomes the first Asian-American female mayor of a major American city when she was elected mayor of Long Beach, California.
- 1983: The Commission on Wartime Relocation and Internment of Civilians reports that Japanese-American internment was not justified by military necessity and that internment was based on "race prejudice, war hysteria, and a failure of political leadership." The Commission recommends an official Government apology; redress payments of $20,000 to each of the survivors; and a public education fund to help ensure that this would not happen again.
- 1987: Charles J. Pedersen wins the Nobel Prize in Chemistry for his methods of synthesizing crown ethers
- 1988: President Ronald Reagan signs the Civil Liberties Act of 1988, apologizing for Japanese-American internment and providing reparations of $20,000 to each former internee who was still alive when the act was passed.
- 1992: The Japanese American National Museum opens in Little Tokyo, Los Angeles.
- 1992: Kristi Yamaguchi wins the Olympic gold medal and her second World Championship title in figure skating.
- 1994: Mazie K. Hirono is elected Lieutenant Governor of Hawaii, becoming the first Japanese immigrant elected state lieutenant governor of a state. Hirono later is elected in the U.S. House of Representatives.
- 1996: A. Wallace Tashima is nominated to the United States Court of Appeals for the Ninth Circuit and becomes the first Japanese American to serve as a judge of a United States court of appeals.
- 1998: Chris Tashima becomes the first U.S.-born Japanese American actor to win an Academy Award for his role in the film Visas and Virtue.
- 1999: U.S. Army General Eric Shinseki becomes the first Asian American to serve as chief of staff of a branch of the armed forces. Shinseki later served as Secretary of Veterans Affairs (2009–2014).
- 2000: Norman Y. Mineta becomes the first Asian American appointed to the United States Cabinet. He serves as Secretary of Commerce from 2000 to 2001 and Secretary of Transportation from 2001 to 2006.
- 2008: Yoichiro Nambu wins the Nobel Prize in Physics for his work on quantum chromodynamics and spontaneous symmetry breaking.
- 2010: Daniel K. Inouye becomes the highest ranking Asian American politician in U.S. history when he succeeds Robert Byrd as President pro tempore of the United States Senate.
- 2011: The Nisei Soldiers of World War II Congressional Gold Medal was awarded in recognition of the World War II service of the 442nd Regimental Combat Team, the 100th Infantry Battalion, and Nisei serving in the Military Intelligence Service on November 2, 2011.
- 2014: Shuji Nakamura wins the 2014 Nobel Prize in Physics for the invention of efficient blue light-emitting diodes.
- 2018: Chief Justice Roberts, in writing the majority opinion of the Supreme Court in Trump v. Hawaii, effectively repudiates the 1944 decision Korematsu v. United States that had upheld the constitutionality of Executive Order 9066.

== See also ==
- History of Asian Americans
- History of Japan
- Japanese diaspora
- Nisei Baseball Research Project
