= Thomas Cavendish's circumnavigation =

British naval voyage 1586–1588

- Part of the Anglo–Spanish War
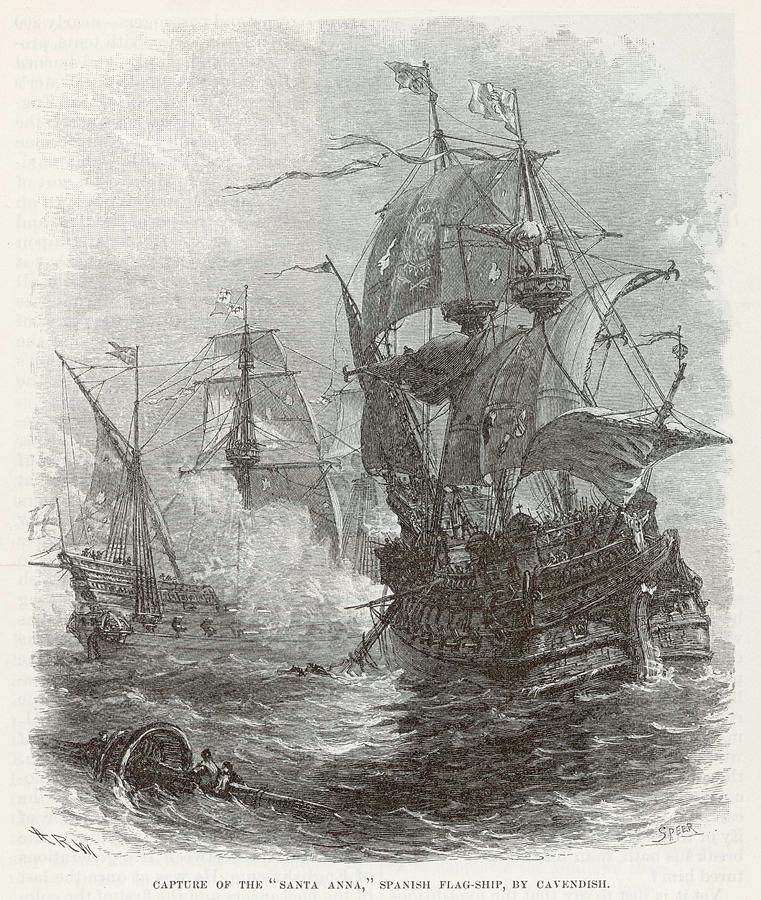
- Cavendish captures the Spanish treasure galleon Santa Ana off Cabo San Lucas
Date	21 July 1586 – 9 September 1588
Location	Spanish Main, Pacific Ocean, Atlantic
Result	English victory

Belligerents
Spain	England

Commanders and leaders
Tomás de Alzola	Thomas Cavendish

Strength
Various Spanish ports & shipping	3 ships 126 sailors and soldiers

Casualties and losses
3 settlements plundered 1 Galleon captured 12 other ships captured or burned	2 ships lost 78 killed, drowned or captured

Thomas Cavendish's circumnavigation was a voyage of raid and exploration by English navigator and sailor Thomas Cavendish which took place during the Anglo–Spanish War between 21 July 1586 and 9 September 1588. Following in the footsteps of Francis Drake who circumnavigated the globe, Thomas Cavendish was influenced in an attempt to repeat the feat. As such it was the first deliberately planned voyage of the globe.

Having set out with his three ships, the English raided three Spanish settlements and captured or burned thirteen ships. Among these was a rich 600 ton sailing ship, a Manila Galleon called Santa Ana (also called Santa Anna); the biggest treasure haul that ever fell into English hands. With only one ship left, Cavendish returned to England on 9 September 1588 completing a full circumnavigation of the Earth in record time. The voyage itself was hugely successful and made Cavendish rich from captured Spanish gold, silk and treasure from the Pacific and the Spanish Philippines. Cavendish was subsequently knighted by Queen Elizabeth I of England.

== Background ==
On 15 December 1577 the English privateer Francis Drake set sail from Plymouth to raid Spanish treasure ships and settlements in the Americas. Drake had investors in the voyage in the hope that they could make a profit from the plunder that the English would capture. After nearly three years at sea Drake in the Golden Hinde returned to England in 26 September 1580 and had accomplished the feat of circumnavigating the globe. The investors had made huge profits from the voyage, and there was a desire to launch more expeditions in the same manner. Drake was subsequently knighted by Queen Elizabeth I. After Drake's voyage, the Spanish felt vulnerable in their colonies and so began to better prepare their settlements against attack by the English, which they knew that they would attack again. Francisco de Toledo began to build a series of fortifications on the coast of the southern tip of South America and established 'la Armada del Mar del Sur' (the Southern Fleet) in the port of El Callao.

With Drake's attacks and English involvement in the Dutch Revolt this increased the annoyance of King Philip II of Spain, and Anglo-Spanish relations continued to deteriorate, eventually moving towards open war. After the execution of Mary Queen of Scots, a Catholic rival to Elizabeth's throne, the inevitable war began in 1585.

Thomas Cavendish meanwhile, a commoner, had inherited his father's wealth aged twelve, and had used some of this money to purchase the ship Elizabeth. He had joined the expedition fleet of Sir Richard Grenville on his journey to Virginia in 1585 and in the process capturing a 400-ton Spanish galleon Santa Maria de San Vicente. Cavendish with the experience he gained was determined to follow Drake by raiding Spanish colonial ports and ships, and also attempt to circumnavigate the globe. He planned his own voyage, mortgaging all his lands and raising upwards of some £10,000. After getting permission for his proposed raids Cavendish built a larger 120 ton sailing ship, with eighteen guns, named the Desire. He was joined by the sixty ton, ten gun ship Content, and the forty ton supply ship Hugh Gallant. In total the complement of the expedition was 123 men and boys, some of whom had been with Drake on his voyage around the world. Taking part in the voyage were Francis Pretty a Suffolk gentleman, sailor and diarist, the mathematician and geographer Robert Hues with "purposely for taking the true Latitude of places"; and the merchant Thomas Eldred. The complement also included workmen who brought with them tools, a portable forge and large quantities of salt to preserve food along the way.

== Voyage ==
On 21 July 1586 Cavendish left Plymouth Sound with the three ships. Five days later, off Cape Finisterre they were involved in a minor skirmish with five Biscayne ships at long range for nearly three hours that only ended when darkness set in and contact was lost. Sailing past the Canary Islands they reached the West African coast (present day Sierra Leone) on 21 August. Eleven days were spent there procuring provisions and water. Whilst there they met the locals and even joined in with dances and festivities in the night. Cavendish intended to capture a Portuguese ship but due to a miscommunication with the natives they in turn burned the native village instead, carrying off with what little loot they could find. The natives retaliated by shooting poisoned arrows, one of which hit an English sailor who died before they sailed off.

=== Across to South America ===
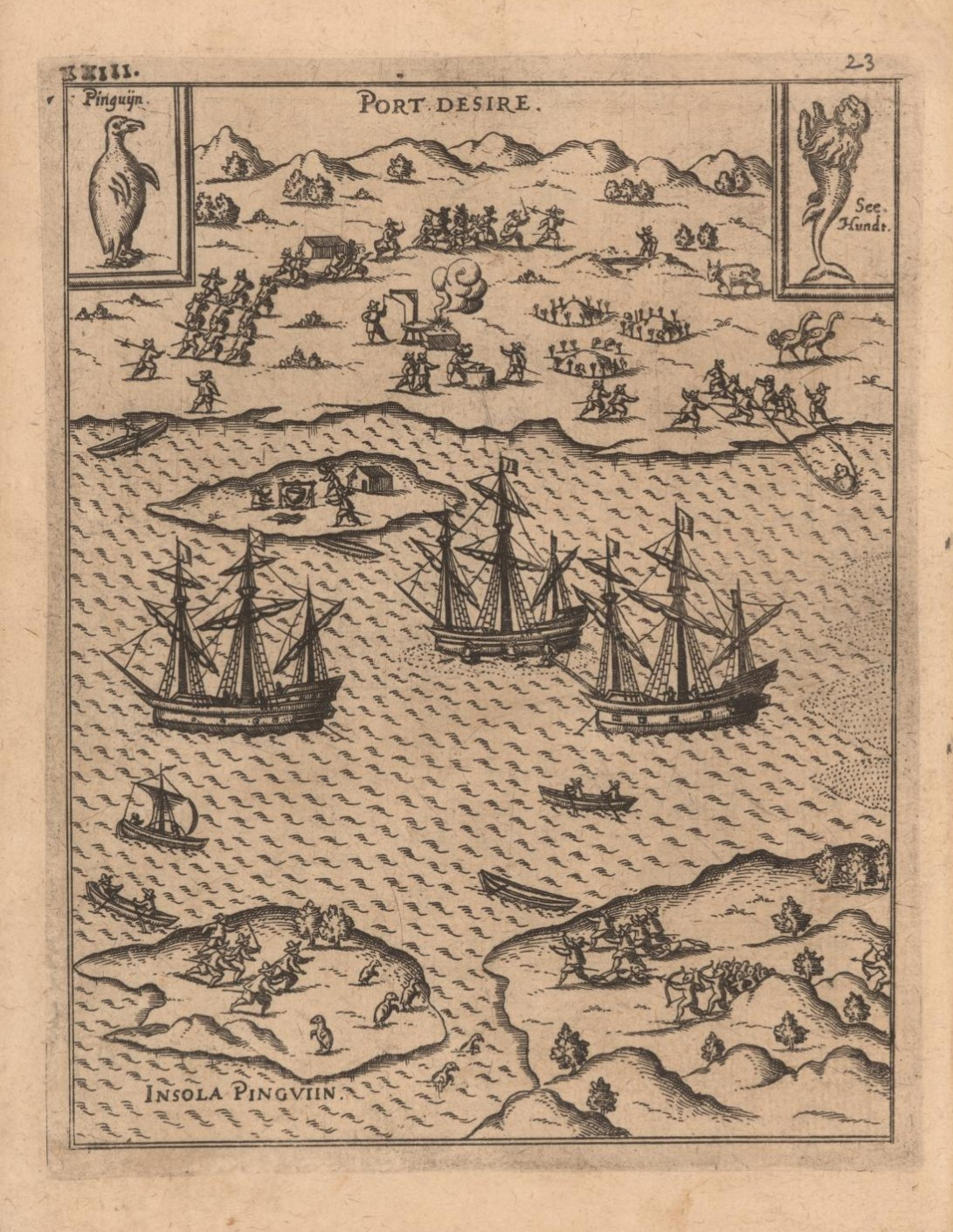
Cavendish's three English ships in Port Desire

In early September Cavendish departed the shores of Africa and began to cross the Atlantic for Portuguese Brazil. After watering in the Cape Verde Islands, on November 1, 1586, the English reached one of the many islands off São Sebastião, there he took on water and built a pinnace before heading further South four days later.

By mid December Cavendish sailed further down the South American East coast and came into an estuary and a suitable harbour. He named this as Port Desire, after his flagship, and met only a few Native Americans, who shot arrows that wounded some of the crew. Having found little fresh water Cavendish sailed on and soon reached the Strait of Magellan on 6 January 1587 where they soon encountered heavy swells from a storm.

=== Strait of Magellan ===
Entering the Strait of Magellan, Cavendish's three vessels passed the Segunda Angostura, the narrowest points of the Straits. The English anchored first at the island of Santa Magdalena. There, in two hours, they killed and salted two barrels-full of penguins for food. Following this they reached Pedro Sarmiento de Gamboa's now ruined settlement of Rey don Felipe by 19 January 1587. Incredibly there were twelve men and three women out of the original 400 Spanish settlers. Cavendish cruelly refused them any assistance except for Tomé Hernandez a veteran pilot that Cavendish intended to make use of. He removed six cannons and then renamed the place 'Port Famine'.

Cavendish sailed in the second half of the Strait and then managed extensive exploration of the many inlets, labyrinths, intricate channels of the islands and broken lands of Tierra del Fuego and its environs. On 24 February 1587 they emerged from the strait into the Pacific and sailed up the western coast South America.

=== Raids on Spanish American West Coast ===
Cavendish however soon ran into a storm – this pushed the ships further north, the Hugh Gallant was then separated from the other two ships. The storm lasted for nearly four days making it impossible for the men to sleep. They finally reached Santa María Island on 15 March 1587. Having landing a party of 70 men the Englishmen were greeted with kindness by the Natives, who supplied them with food, and who received in return entertainment in the captain's ship. The English then traded supplies with the natives, who had valuable captured Spanish goods. Days later the Hugh Gallant appeared and reunited with the others between Santa Maria Island and the mainland.

==== Concepción, Arica and Paita ====
The Englishmen steered north toward Mocha Island, which they sighted on 24 March 1587 – by the end of the month they had arrived at Quintero, having overshot Valparaíso, a place which they intended to stop at. They anchored just off Concepción; here they had an encounter with Spaniards on horseback, but they only watched the English from a distance. Cavendish travelled some eight miles inland, declaring the valley area to be 'very fruitful'. Tomé Hernandez was sent to parley with the local population but this turned out to be a betrayal as he instead made his escape. He warned the local Spanish inhabitants, who grouped together numbering nearly 200 then launched an ambush on the English whilst they were collecting water. The Spanish were eventually driven off with the loss of twenty four men, but not before the English had lost seven men killed and nine captured. Cavendish however stayed in Quintero Bay before leaving 5 April heading towards the port of Arica and entering the tropic zone.

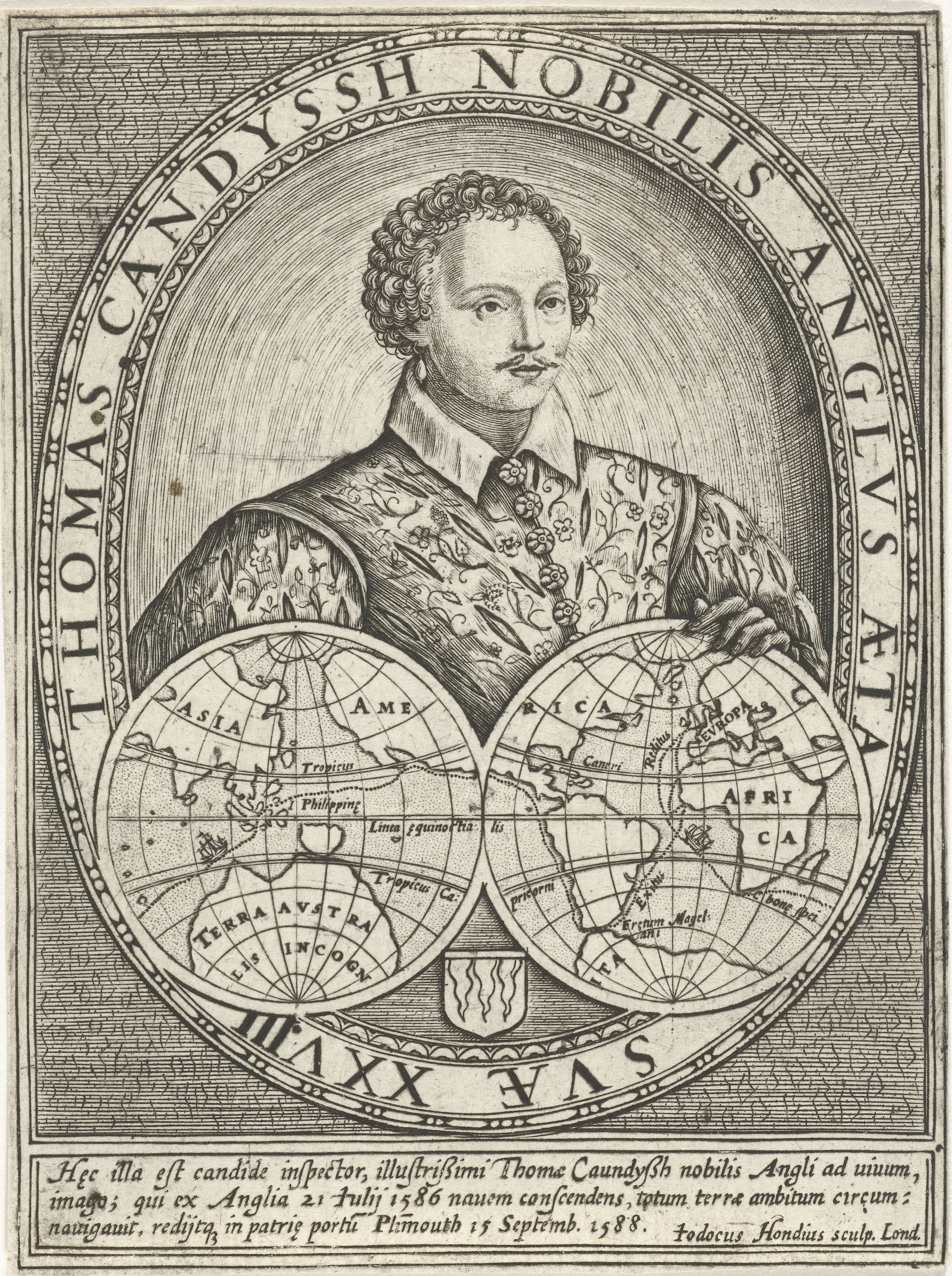
Portrait of Thomas Cavendish

Before reaching Arica, Cavendish on 23 April 1587 came across a barque loaded with wine, and captured the vessel. It was renamed George given the proximity date of Saint George's Day. George was subsequently incorporated into the squadron. The following morning a large Spanish ship and four barks were captured off Arica. Arriving at Arica Cavendish saw the town ready for its defence and even exchanged shot with the Spanish shore batteries. A design of landing and storming the town was abandoned but another three ships were burned in the harbour before the English sailed northwest two days later. Cargo included barrels of Chilean wine and various dispatches and a Greek pilot Jorge Carandino of Chios. Cavendish resorted to torture in order to oblige prisoners to disclose the contents of letter that they had thrown overboard.

On 14 May 1587 Cavendish reached Pisco and intercepted two Spanish merchantmen three days later, which he pillaged and burned. Using the port as a base to re-victual the English ships then dispersed to carry out independent actions of their own – two days later the Hugh Gallant captured a vessel of 300 tons bringing in timber from Guayaquil but abandoned her to sink because she was taking on water. The Hugh Gallant then descended upon Paita four days later having a captured a bark in the harbour. Sixty men from the ship waded ashore to occupy the town while its 300 inhabitants fled inland. Threatened with a ransom the citizens refused to raise any, so the English set the dwellings ablaze before sailing north robbing the inhabitants of some twenty five pounds in sliver pesos.

==== Puna Island and Huatulco ====
With the ships reunited they all dropped anchor off Puná Island on 25 May 1587. Cavendish intended to careen and repair the ships. The crew noted the idyllic nature of the island with plenty of fruit. When they landed however about sixteen of Cavendish's men were surprised by a large group Spaniards and Indians having come from Quito. Under Captain Juan de Galarza, they initially scattered the English and more skirmishes followed. The English however gained the upper hand when Cavendish landed with more men and drove off the Spanish killing some 46 or a loss of nine sailors killed and three more captured. Cavendish then ordered all of Puná's buildings, ships and crops burned. Some 300 buildings were set on fire, a ship of 250 tons was burnt at anchor whilst four more on the stocks were looted and then burnt; the church was also burnt and its bells carried away. The English stayed making sure everything of value was taken before sailing on.

Whilst in an inlet near Guayaquil on 5 June 1587, a decision was made to abandon the Hugh Gallant and the George due to lack of men to crew both and that repairs would take longer. They stripped both vessels of iron, canvas and anything useful before setting both alight, and departed eleven days later. The held a northerly course for over month before sighting New Spain.

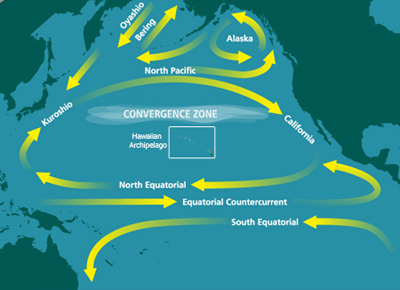
The North Pacific currents and winds used by both the Manila Galleon and Cavendish to get to Guam and the Philippines – the North Pacific Gyre

News of the raids reached Panama by early July, and two ships were sent out to intercept the English raiders but they were two weeks late. In addition news reached Álvaro Manrique de Zúñiga the Viceroy of New Spain but again did not reach him in time so was unable to commit to any orders.

On 9 July 1587 Cavendish captured a vessel – although it was without cargo one of the captured pilots Michael Sancius revealed that a Manila galleon was expected in October or November 1587 and usually stopped at Cabo San Lucas on the Baja California peninsula before going on to Acapulco.More evidence of this emerged when soon after another vessel was taken which was supposed to have warned the galleon of impending English raiders.

Two weeks later Cavendish entered the river River Copalita several leagues from Huatulco during the night a pinnace was sent with thirty men during the journey up the river they captured a bark from Sonsonate laden with cacao and indigo. On 2 August 1587 Cavendish himself appeared at Huatulco and captured the place and looted everything within seven miles over the course of a week. The raids proved profitable and before departing he set the buildings ablaze and did the same to a merchant vessel in the harbour before heading further north.

==== Barra de Navidad, Acatlan and Chacala ====
Cavendish next landed at Barra de Navidad on 24 August 1587. The English imprisoned the Spanish lookout and then destroyed two ships of 200 tons each, which were being built by Antonio del Castillo and Juan Toscano and were about to be launched. The English sailors also captured a messenger who carried the viceroy's warning of the English presence before setting fire to any of the buildings at the mouth of the lagoon.

On 5 September 1587 Cavendish sailed to the deserted bays of Santiago and Salagua near Manzanillo. The English stayed for a week taking on water and other provisions – they also amused themselves with swimming and diving for pearls. Moving up to the coast Cavendish weighed anchor at Tenacatitia Bay and took thirty men inland to the village of Acatlan where they burned most of the houses and defaced the church. Leaving the bay on 14 September Cavendish moved on to Chacala a sheltered bay but found very little. They did capture two prisoners – they held them hostage in order for others to bring them food so they could release them. The locals complied and having loaded fresh fruits, bread and other food Cavendish continued voyage.

After leaving Chacala on 20 September 1587 Cavendish then sailed past Compostela and anchored in one of the islands of Tres Marias staying for five days where some iguanas and birds were caught. On 4 October the two English ships moved off and in need of repairs anchored in the port of Mazatlán where they were careened and weight shifted (trimming). Cavendish then headed to the southwestern tip of Baja California, and spent over a month at a place he called 'Aguada Segura' which can be identified as San Lucas Bay or San José del Cabo. Here Cavendish was determined to wait for the Manila galleon.

The Manila galleons were restricted by the Spanish Monarch to one or two ships/year and typically carried all the goods accumulated in the Spanish Philippines in a year's worth of trading silver, from the Mints in the Americas, with the Chinese and others, for spices, silk, gold and other expensive goods. In 1587 there were two Manila galleons: the San Francisco and the Santa Ana but both encountered a typhoon on leaving the Philippines and were wrecked on the coast of Japan. Only the Santa Ana was salvageable and after repairs resumed her voyage.

=== Capture of the Galleon Santa Ana ===
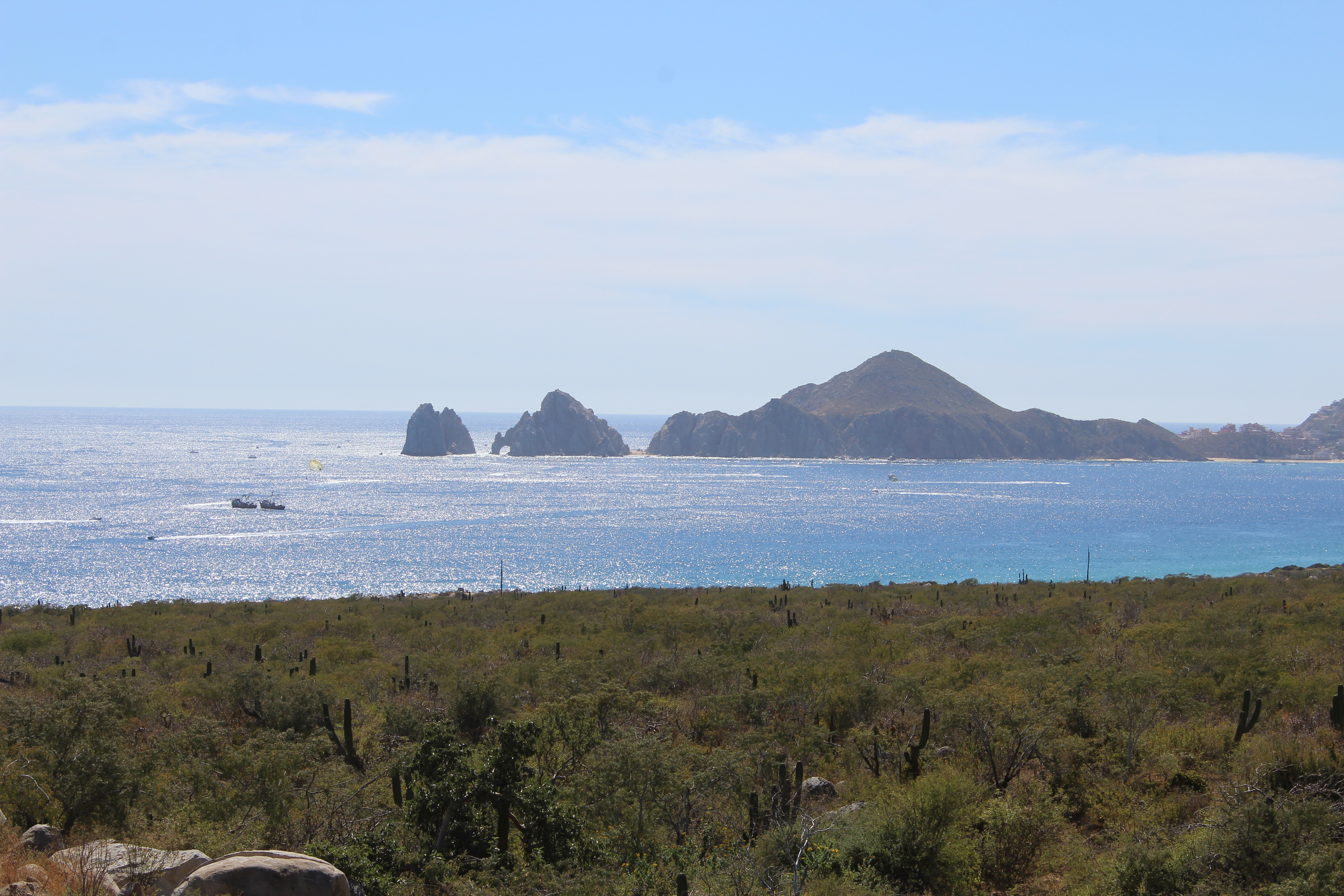
View of El Arco Bay where Cavendish awaited the Manila Galleon

Early on 4 November 1587 one of Cavendish's lookouts spotted the 600 ton galleon manned with over 200 men off Cabo San Lucas. After a several hour chase the English ships overhauled the Santa Ana, which conveniently had no cannons on board to allow more cargo. After several hours of battle during which Cavendish used his cannon to fire ball and grape shot into the galleon while the Spanish tried to fight back with small arms. The Santa Ana began to take heavy damage and was holed below the waterline a number of times. With his vessel taking on water the captain Tomás de Alzola refused to surrender but was begged upon by pilot (navigator) Alonso de Valladolid to plead for the life of his crew in exchange for the goods on board the Santa Ana. Realising he had no choice, de Alzola struck his colours and surrendered. The cost was small – two English were killed with another ten wounded, whilst the Spanish had suffered twelve killed and fifty wounded. The victorious English grappled the ship and towed into Aguada Segura. The ships were then lashed together and the prize was consolidated.

With the great disparity in size, the Content and Desire had to pick and choose what rich cargo they wanted to transfer to their ships from the much larger Santa Ana. One hundred and ninety Spaniards (including Sebastián Vizcaíno later explorer of the California coast and Juan de Fuca later explorer of the North American West coast), and Filipino crewmen were captured. Cavendish kept with him two Japanese sailors named Christopher and Cosmas as well as three boys from Manila, one of them a Negro. In addition a Portuguese traveller Nicholas Roderigo familiar with China and the pilot Alonso de Valladolid both defected and were willing to work with the English. The prisoners helped load all the gold (about 100 troy pounds or 122,000 pesos' worth) and the English picked through the silks, damasks, musks (used in perfume manufacture), spices, wines and the ship's supplies for what they could carry. It was claimed that the total value of the cargo was about 2,100,000 pesos. English sailors helped themselves to the cargo before the rest of less value was thrown overboard. The Spanish crew were released and given fresh provisions, water and wine; even weapons to defend themselves against native attacks. On 17 November 1587, Queene's Day, the English celebrated that evening with the victory they had won – gorging themselves on wine and food. The ship's guns were discharged and there was display of fireworks – the culmination was the Santa Ana being set on fire and left adrift burning.

Desire and Content sailed away the following day to continue their voyage north. After the fire on Santa Ana had gone out, the Spanish survivors then managed to build a raft from the remains and used it to summon help from nearby Colima. They were eventually rescued and carried into Acapulco on 7 December and gave news of the capture.

=== Across the Pacific Ocean ===
Upon reaching the Gulf of California in October Cavendish and his two ships put in at an island above Mazatlan where they careened their ships. After this was done the Desire and Content sailed away on 17 November 1587 to begin their voyage across the Pacific Ocean. After they sailed off Content separated from Desire during the night. Cavendish assumed they had returned to England but Content and her crew was never heard or seen again and last seen heading North.

After a quick crossing of the Pacific Ocean, Cavendish and the Desire arrived at the island of Guam on 3 January 1588. There he traded iron tools for fresh supplies, water and wood, supplied by the natives before setting off Westward.

=== Spanish Philippines ===
Cavendish sailed past the Mariana Islands heading towards the Spanish Philippines. Touching at northeastern Samar on 14 January 1588, Desire passed through the narrow San Bernardino Strait into the Sibuyan Sea, then sailed south to Panay. Having arrived not far off Manila the English realised they were not strong enough to attack the capital. The Portuguese pilot Roderigo on board then claimed that the Spanish pilot Tome de Alzola was trying to get his fellow countryman via a letter to the natives from Manilla to attack from the shore. Sure enough the letter was discovered – in it was Cavendish's depredations, present location and a plea for help. Alzola denied the accusations but under torture soon confessed – he was then hanged from the yard arm the following morning. Soon after there was a need to stock up on provisions and so they searched for a place that was adequate and free of Spanish. Desire anchored off the island of Capul where Cavendish spent several days with a native chief who traded them with vegetables, hens and hogs for linen and captured Spanish specie.

Due to the Desire's valuable cargo Cavendish was reluctant to attack other vessels. Cavendish did manage to raid a large villa belonging to Bishop Domingo de Salazar looting the contents. An attempt to make a surprise attack on a galleon under construction at Areval shipyard ended in failure when the landing party was discovered early on; they promptly returned to Desire without loss. Cavendish nevertheless picked up a great deal of information on Japan and the Chinese coast which he hoped to use on a future expedition. A large map of China also came into his possession.

=== Java ===
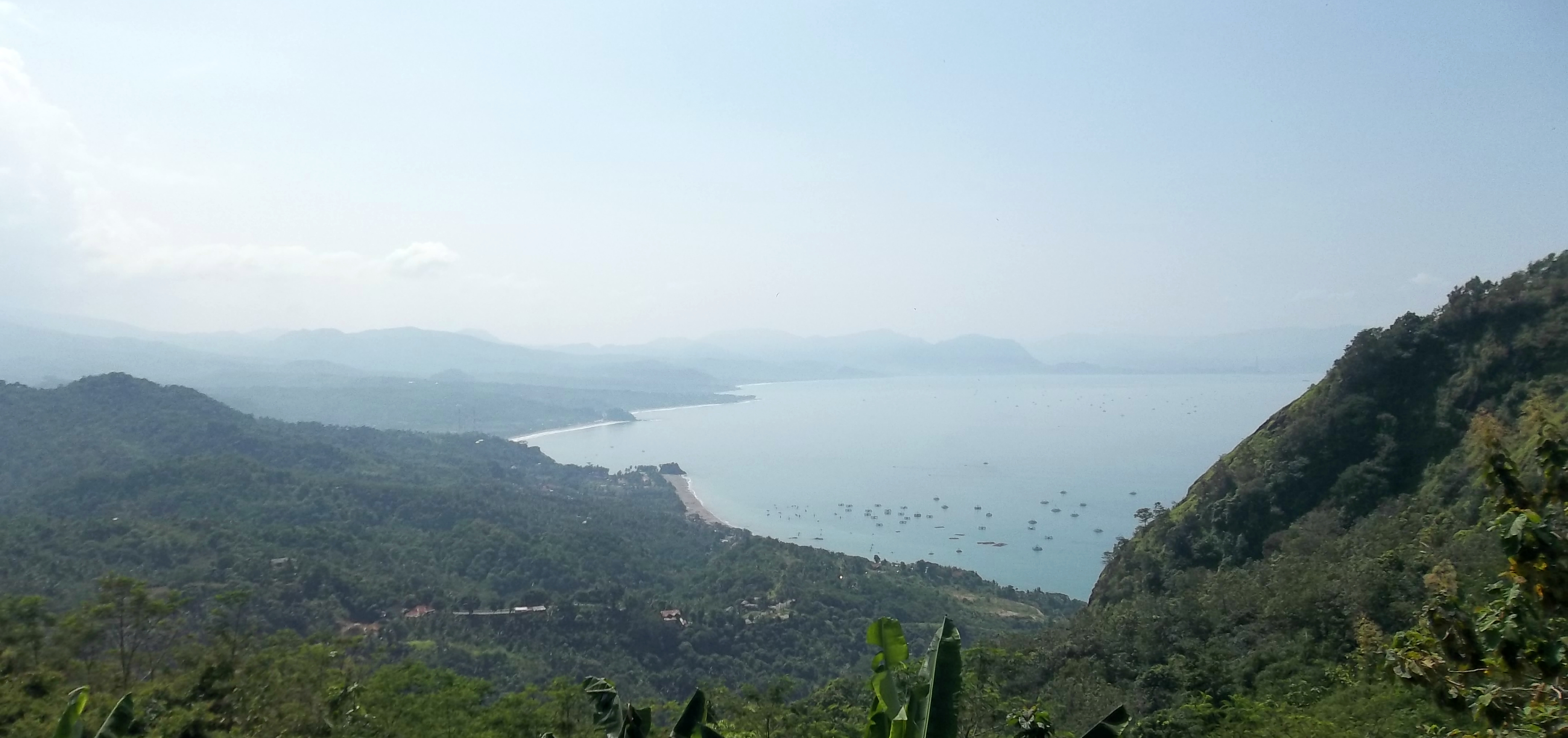
Palabuhanratu Bay in West Java, where Cavendish anchored in March 1588

Cavendish was now eager to return to England, and after leaving the Philippines they passed the Moluccas, the island of Bali and arrived on the island of Lombok on 1 March 1588. Five days later he anchored on the West end of the island of Java at Palabuhanratu Bay. A frosty reception from the natives soon turned friendly thanks to a Negro sailor who had been aboard the Santa Anna. He spoke a dialect of Arabic that the natives could understand, and through him the English were able to obtain food and water in the four days they were there. The Chief of the natives was entertained by the English on board the Desire with music being played for him.

Two Portuguese visitors from a nearby factory also visited after news of the English arrival. They were friendly to the English and were welcomed aboard having been concerned of their king's fate. They explained that the Spanish had informed them that their King António, Prior of Crato was dead. They rejoiced when Cavendish told them that their king was very much alive and in England. The Portuguese men gave plenty of detail regarding the politics in the region and the riches of Java. The natives also promised a kind reception on the Englishman's return.

=== Indian Ocean to Saint Helena ===
On 16 March 1588 Cavendish bade farewell to the natives and Portuguese of Java and sailed Westward across the Indian Ocean. The voyage was swift until 10 May when a storm struck and soon after Desire was becalmed. Four days later through the mist they came across False Bay off Southern Africa where they watered and gathered fruit (Cavendish mistook this for the Cape of Good Hope). Desire set off without encountering any storms they headed North into the Atlantic only stopping at the island of Saint Helena on 8 June. Intending to gather for supplies, Cavendish became the first Englishman known to have visited the island (though Sir Francis Drake may have preceded him), which at the time was occupied by the Portuguese, although none were encountered at the time. Here the ship was careened and re-victualled with turkeys, partridges, goats and wild hogs that had populated the island. Cavendish was able to stay for two weeks exploring the island making detailed notes on the islands steep valleys and numerous fruit trees.

=== Return to England ===
About the end of August they passed the Azores and on 3 September 1588 met a Flemish hulk from Lisbon which informed them of the defeat of the Spanish Armada, much to the Englishmen's great rejoicing.

Early in September Cavendish with his remaining ship Desire and men entered the English Channel. They were hit by a storm as they entered which blew out the sails but having just missed the passing of the ships of the Armada who had encountered the same storm as they were heading towards Santander. Nevertheless, on 9 September 1588 the Desire finally sailed into the harbour at Plymouth to much rejoicing from the local populace.

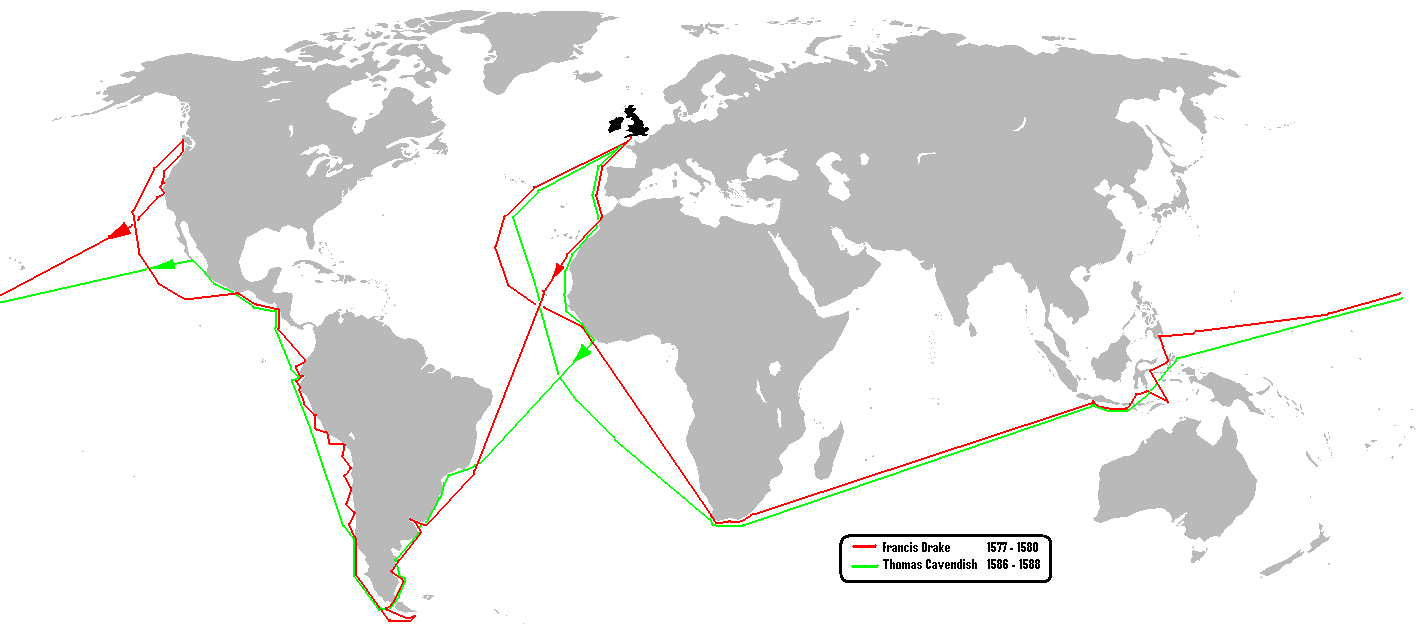
Comparison between Francis Drake's and Thomas Cavendish's circumnavigations

== Aftermath ==
Cavendish, at the age of twenty-eight, became the second Englishman to circumnavigate the globe. The Desire was only the third ship to circumnavigate the globe after the Victoria of Ferdinand Magellan (journey completed by Juan Sebastián Elcano) and the Golden Hind of Francis Drake. Cavendish and Drake's reconnaissance work in the East Indies had laid the foundation for further privateering to even more distant zones of conflict.

Cavendish's voyage was a huge success financially, but more importantly it was a huge propaganda coup. The circumnavigation along with the capture of the Spanish galleon Santa Ana, the safe return of the Desire and the recent defeat of the Spanish Armada which had only taken place a few months before was celebrated throughout England and even spurred on other explorers. Cavendish himself was the object of wide popular acclaim celebrated in numerous songs and ballads. After rest and recuperation the Desire with the crew was then paraded up the River Thames through London, displaying her new sails of blue damask. Cavendish was knighted by Queen Elizabeth I who was invited to a dinner aboard the Desire. He was also warmly received at court by the Queen and was significantly enriched by the adventure.

Cavendish's circumnavigation of the globe had been completed in two years and 49 days; nine months faster than Drake, although, like Drake, Cavendish returned with only one of his ships, the Desire with a crew of about 48 men. The expedition had suffered some thirty casualties but the survival rate among the crew was 76 percent which was high.

For the Spanish, Cavendish's intervention into the closed realms of the Pacific struck a second blow to their prestige. Bishop Salazar in the Philippines bitterly complained in a letter to King Philip II that an English youth at about 22 years, with a wretched little vessel of about 100 tuns, 40 to 50 companions boasted of the damage he had wrought, and went away laughing.

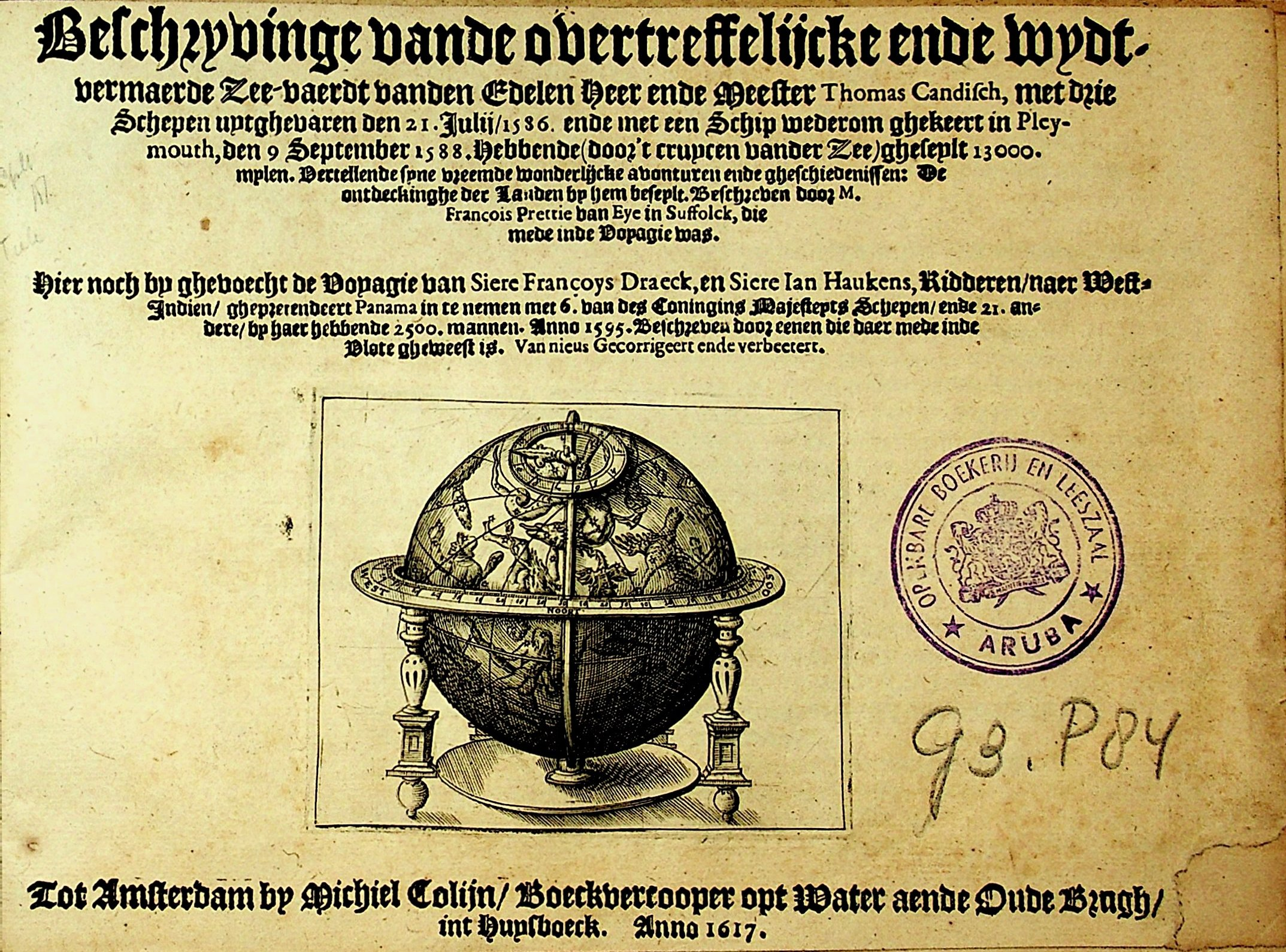
Title page of the 1617 edition Emanuel van Meteren's publication of Pretty's diaries in Dutch

Cavendish sailed on a second expedition in August 1591, accompanied by the navigator John Davis. They went further south to the Strait of Magellan and then returned to Brazil, where they hid and reprovisioned in Ilhabela and looted Santos and São Vicente. Cavendish set off across the Atlantic towards Saint Helena with the remainder of the crew, but died of unknown causes at age 31, possibly off Ascension Island in the South Atlantic in 1592.

Due to the dubious legality of the expedition (as with Drake's Circumnavigation) Francis Pretty's accounts were officially suppressed; the earliest unofficial accounts were published in Dutch by Emanuel van Meteren who purchased both Drake and Cavendish's diaries and mixed elements of one with the other. Excerpts of both diaries were also included in Richard Hakluyt's 1582 and 1589 treatises on British explorations of North America, before he published the Cavendish diary in its entirety in 1600.

The Dutch were next to attempt Drake's and Cavendish's feat – Simon de Cordes and Oliver Van Noort completed their raids of circumnavigation against the Spanish. The next English circumnavigation of the globe would not take place until a century later when William Dampier became the first person to circumnavigate the world three times.

== Legacy ==
Puerto Deseado in Argentina is named after Cavendish's flagship Desire. It also has a point of land at the harbour mouth which is still known as Punta Cavendish.

== Bibliography ==
- Alexander, Philip F, ed. (2011). The Earliest Voyages Round the World, 1519–1617. Cambridge University Press. ISBN 9781107600621.
- Bekker, Anton Ettienne (1990). The History of False Bay Up to 1795. Simon's Town Historical Society. ISBN 9780620153836.
- Bicheno, Hugh (2012). Elizabeth's Sea Dogs: How England's Mariners Became the Scourge of the Seas. Conway. ISBN 978-1844861743.
- Bradley, Peter T (2010). British Maritime Enterprise in the New World: From the Late Fifteenth to the Mid-eighteenth Century. Edwin Mellen Press Ltd. ISBN 978-0773478664.
- Chaplin, Joyce E (2013). Round About the Earth: Circumnavigation from Magellan to Orbit. Simon and Schuster. ISBN 9781416596202.
- Childs, David (2014). Pirate Nation: Elizabeth I and her Royal Sea Rovers. Seaforth Publishing. ISBN 9781848321908.
- Dawson, Ian (1998). Who's who in British History: A–H Volume 1 of Who's who in British History: Beginnings to 1901. Taylor & Francis. ISBN 9781884964909.
- Dean, James Seay (2013). Tropics Bound: Elizabeth's Seadogs on the Spanish Main. History Press. ISBN 9780752496689.
- Fish, Shirley (2011). The Manila-Acapulco Galleons : the Treasure Ships of the Pacific: With an Annotated List of the Transpacific Galleons 1565–1815. AuthorHouse. ISBN 9781456775438.
- Gerhard, Peter (1990). Pirates of the Pacific, 1575–1742. University of Nebraska Press. ISBN 9780803270305.
- Kelsey, Harry (2016). The First Circumnavigators: Unsung Heroes of the Age of Discovery. Yale University Press. ISBN 9780300217780.
- Lane, Kris E (1999). Blood and Silver: A History of Piracy in the Caribbean and Central America. Signal Books. ISBN 9781902669014.
- Marley, David (2008). Wars of the Americas: A Chronology of Armed Conflict in the Western Hemisphere. ABC CLIO. ISBN 978-1598841008.
- Mercene, Floro L (2007). Manila Men in the New World: Filipino Migration to Mexico and the Americas from the Sixteenth Century. UP Press. ISBN 9789715425292.
- Morris, Michael A (1989). The Strait of Magellan. Martinus Nijhoff Publishers. ISBN 9780792301813.
- Speake, Jennifer, ed. (2003). Literature of Travel and Exploration: A to F. Taylor & Francis. ISBN 9781579584252.
- Spate, Oskar Hermann Khristian (2004). The Spanish Lake. Volume 1 of Pacific since Magellan. ANU E Press. ISBN 9781920942168.
- Thompson, Gunnar (2010). Commander Francis Drake & the West Coast Mysteries. Lulu.com. ISBN 9780557494866.
- Wagner, John (2013). Historical Dictionary of the Elizabethan World: Britain, Ireland, Europe and America. Routledge. ISBN 9781136597619.
- Young, Delbert Alton (1973). According to Hakluyt: Tales of Adventure and Exploration. Irwin, Clarke. ISBN 9780772005878.
