= Anthony Knivet =

English sailor (fl. 1591–1649)

Anthony Knivet, also Anthony Knyvett or Antonie Knivet (fl. 1591–1649), was an English sailor who fell into Portuguese hands in Brazil, after the Cavendish expedition lost most of the crew in a battle against the Portuguese at the village of Vitória, today the capital of the State of Espirito Santo. Knivet lived for a while with a native Brazilian tribe, and wrote about his adventures after his eventual return to Britain.

He was an illegitimate son of Sir Henry Knyvet of Charlton, Wiltshire. In 1591 he joined an English privateer, Thomas Cavendish, on a voyage aimed at raiding Portuguese holdings in Brazil. Cavendish was at the height of his fame, having completed a successful voyage around the world from 1586 to 1588.

After Cavendish's men had raided the town of Santos and destroyed several Portuguese sugar plantations, they traveled on and eventually left Knivet, who had developed frostbite in the Strait of Magellan, along with nineteen other sick or mutinous men on the then remote island of Ilhabela. He was captured by the Portuguese and was put to work as a slave on a sugar plantation. Later he was tasked with traveling inland and contacting natives in order to obtain more slaves. After a failed escape attempt, he was sent back to a plantation, where he attacked his owner and fled again. He met a native who had also fled from slavery, and together they made it to an indigenous Brazilian tribe of Tupí people, where they stayed for nine months. Sold for metal tools back to the Portuguese, he was forced to work for the governor of Rio de Janeiro, Salvador Correia de Sá, o Velho. He managed to escape to West Africa (Congo and Angola). The Rio governor obtained his extradition to Brazil and he then returned with the governor to Portugal, from where he finally made his way back to England in 1601.

Upon return, Knivet wrote his memoir and sold it to Richard Hakluyt, who sold it on to Samuel Purchas. Purchas published an abbreviated version in his Purchas his Pilgrimes (1613) and a more complete version under the title "The Admirable Adventures and Strange Fortunes of Master Antonie Knivet, which went with Master Thomas Candish in his Second Voyage to the South Sea, 1591" in Purchas his Pilgrimes, part IV, book 6, chapter 7 (London 1625). This work was reprinted in 1906. Excerpts about his time in Africa were published as "Appendix I: Anthony Knivet in Kongo and Angola" of The strange adventures of Andrew Battell of Leigh, in Angola and the adjoining regions, 1901.

While Knivet's descriptions of Brazil are generally precise and believable, his writing about Africa contains several mistakes and contradictions. The published memoir suffers from Purchas' deletion of several sections; it is possible that these were motivated by his negative attitude towards Catholicism.

Anthony Knivet went on to become co-teller of the Royal Mint, thanks to intervention by his uncle Thomas Knyvet who had served as Warden of the Mint and was famous for having foiled the Gunpowder Plot.

== See also ==
- Captivity narrative
- Christopher and Cosmas – Japanese explorers
