= Japanese ship Wakamiya =

Two ships of the Japanese Navy have been named Wakamiya:

- Japanese seaplane carrier Wakamiya was a seaplane tender converted from a transport ship in 1914. She was stricken in 1931
- Japanese escort ship Wakamiya was an Etorofu-class escort ship both launched and sunk in 1943
- Wakamiya-maru, was a cargo ship whose crew members and the first Japanese ship to circumnavigate the globe
