= Otokichi =

Japanese castaway

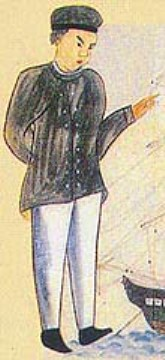
- Japanese drawing of Otokichi in 1849, as he visited Japan passing for a Chinese man.
- Born: 1818; Mihama, Aichi Prefecture, Tokugawa shogunate
- Died: January 1, 1867 (aged 49); Singapore
- Resting place: Japanese Cemetery Park, Hougang, Singapore
- Other name: John Matthew Ottoson
- Citizenship: British

Otokichi (音吉 or 乙吉), also known as Yamamoto Otokichi (山本音吉) and later known as John Matthew Ottoson (1818 – January 1867), was a Japanese castaway originally from the area of Onoura near modern-day Mihama, on the west coast of the Chita Peninsula in Aichi Prefecture.

== Biography ==
Otokichi was from Mihama, Aichi Prefecture. In 1832, at age 14, he served as a crew member on a rice transport ship bound for Edo, the Hojunmaru (宝順丸), 15 metres (49 ft) in length with a cargo of 150 tons and a crew of 14. The ship left on October 11, 1832, but was caught in a storm and blown off-course far out in the Pacific Ocean.

=== Drift to America ===
The ship, without a mast or a rudder, was carried across the northern Pacific Ocean by currents. It drifted for 14 months, during which the crew lived on desalinated seawater and on the rice of their cargo. Several crew members died of scurvy; only three survived by the time they arrived at Cape Alava, the westernmost point of Washington's Olympic Peninsula, in 1834. The three survivors were Iwakichi, 29; Kyukichi, 16; and Otokichi, then 15.

The three castaways were looked after and briefly enslaved by the Makah Indian tribe. They were later handed over to John McLoughlin, the Chief Factor for the Columbia District at the Hudson's Bay Company.

=== Travel to Europe ===
McLoughlin, envisioning an opportunity to use the castaways to open trade with Japan, sent the trio to London on the Eagle to try to convince the Crown of his plan. They reached London in 1835, probably the first Japanese to do so since Christopher and Cosmas in the 16th century.

The British Government ultimately declined interest in the enterprise, and the castaways were instead dispatched to Macau on board the General Palmer, so that they could be returned to their home country.

=== Macau and attempt to return to Japan ===
Japanese drawing of the Morrison, anchored in front of Uraga in 1837.

Once in Macau, Otokichi, Kyukichi, and Iwakichi were welcomed by Karl Gutzlaff, a German missionary and Chinese translator for the British government. Gutzlaff, who had views on evangelizing Japan, enthusiastically learned the Japanese language from the trio, and with their help managed to make a translation of the Gospel of John into Japanese. The trio was joined in Macau by four more castaways from Kumamoto Prefecture in Kyūshū, who had been shipwrecked on the island of Luzon in the Philippines.

An opportunity to return them to Japan appeared, when the American trader Charles W. King offered to take them back to Japan, again with the hope of establishing trade relations with the country. In July 1837, the seven castaways left with Charles W. King on board the Morrison to Uraga at the entrance of Edo Bay. There the ship was fired on repeatedly, and King was not able to accomplish his objective to establish diplomatic contact. He then went to Kagoshima, but again was met with cannon fire, and finally decided to abandon his efforts and go back to Canton. The castaways resigned themselves to a life in exile. Returning to Japan was problematic, for this was during Japan's period of isolation where leaving the country was an offense that was punishable by death.

=== New life abroad ===
Unable to return to Japan, the castaways started a new life in Macau. They seem to have worked as translators for the British trade legation and British missionaries.

Otokichi is next recorded as working for the British trading company Dent & Co. in Shanghai in 1843. He apparently also worked as a crewman on American ships, and worked at helping Japanese castaways to return to Japan on board Chinese or Dutch ships, the only ones allowed to visit the country. He also engaged in business on his own behalf.

Otokichi married a Scotswoman in Macau who later died of illness. His second wife, Louisa Belder, was half-German and half-Malay, living in Singapore, with whom he had a son and three daughters. He became a naturalized British subject, taking the name John Matthew Ottoson. "Ottoson" is said to have been a transliteration of "Oto-san" (literally "Mr. Oto"), a respectful nickname used by his Japanese friends.

=== Return to Japan ===
Otokichi is known to have returned to Japan twice, first as a translator on board HMS Mariner, which entered Uraga Port in 1849 to conduct a topographical survey. To avoid problems with Japanese authorities, he disguised himself as Chinese, and said that he had learned Japanese from his father, allegedly a businessman who had worked in relation with Nagasaki.

The second time, Otokichi went to Japan under his British name "Ottoson", in September 1854. He was a member of the British fleet under Admiral James Stirling. The fleet docked at Nagasaki and negotiated and signed the Anglo-Japanese Friendship Treaty on October 14. On that occasion, Otokichi met with many Japanese, including Fukuzawa Yukichi. He was apparently offered permission to live in Japan, but he chose to return to his family in Shanghai.

Toward the end of his life, Otokichi moved from Shanghai to Singapore, his wife's native island, where he became the first known Japanese resident of Singapore. The British had compensated him generously for his contribution to the treaty with Japan, and he had done well in business deals in Shanghai. He apparently rented a luxurious colonial house on Orchard Road, which is where he died of tuberculosis at the age of 49, in 1867. Otokichi was buried at the Japanese Cemetery of Singapore. Half of his remains were returned to his hometown of Mihama in Japan on February 20, 2005.

== In popular culture ==
The story of the Hojunmaru castaways was adapted as the feature film Kairei in 1983. Despite starring country singer Johnny Cash as John McLoughlin, and having a reported budget of US$4,000,000, the film was not a commercial success.

== See also ==
- Nakahama Manjirō, another castaway, who went to America 10 years later.
- Oguri Jukichi, another castaway, whose damaged vessel Tokujomaru drifted to vicinity of Santa Barbara, California in 1815.
- Hasekura Tsunenaga, who went to Europe through Mexico on a diplomatic mission in 1614, on the Japanese galleon San Juan Bautista.
- Tanaka Shōsuke visited the Americas in 1610
- William Adams (sailor), English pilot of Dutch fleet who settled in Japan 1600.
- Christopher and Cosmas, first Japanese to visit England in 1591
- Bernardo the Japanese, first Japanese person to set foot in Europe
- Ranald MacDonald, first native-English speaker to teach English in Japan
- Tsudayu, castaway on Unalaska, Alaska, first Japanese to complete a circumnavigation of the world with Nikolai Rezanov in 1806
- Wakamiya-maru, a 1794 Japanese shipwreck in Alaska, some of the survivors becoming the first Japanese to circumnavigate the world, as passengers with the first Russian circumnavigation.
