= Christopher and Cosmas =

Japanese explorers

Christopher and Cosmas were two Japanese men, only known by their Christian names, who are recorded to have travelled across the Pacific on a Spanish galleon in 1587, and were later forced to accompany the English navigator Thomas Cavendish to England, Brazil and the Southern Atlantic, where they disappeared with the sinking of his ship in 1592.

== Western accounts ==
=== Pacific crossing on a Spanish galleon ===
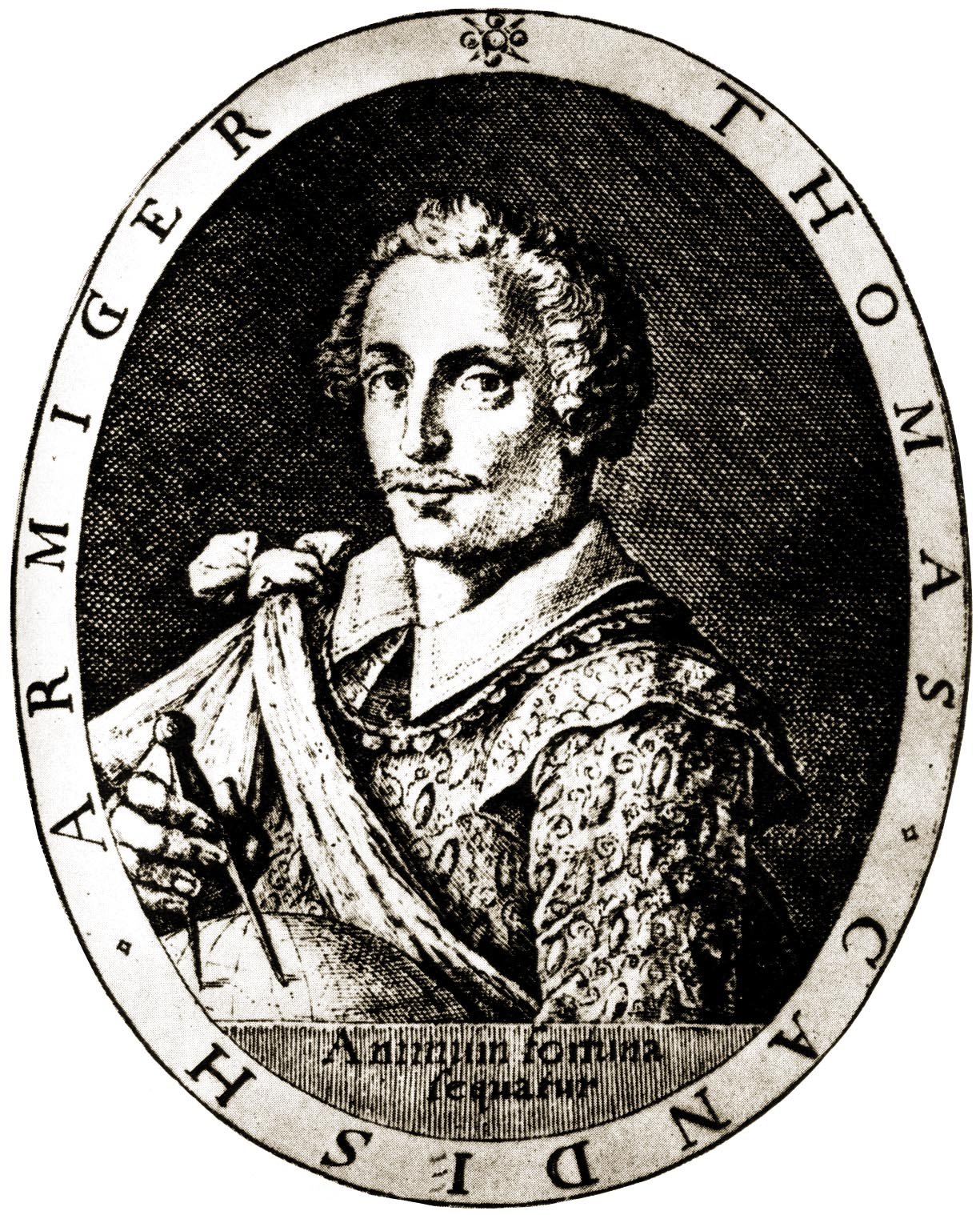
Sir Thomas Cavendish, the English navigator with whom most of the accounts of Christopher and Cosmas are related

They are first mentioned by the navigator Francis Pretty, in Richard Hakluyt's account of the travels of Cavendish. He writes that on 4 November 1587 the 27-year-old Cavendish, with two ships the Desire (120 tons) and the Content (60 tons) intercepted a Spanish ship, a Manila galleon named Santa Ana, off the coast of Baja California (at Bernabe Bay, some 20 miles east of Cabo San Lucas). Cavendish disembarked the crew onshore, took the rich cargo, and put the ship on fire. But he also chose to keep with him several of the crew in view of his future voyages. In particular, he selected two young Japanese men:

On the 6th day of November following, we went into a harbour which is called by the Spaniards, Puerto Seguro. Here the whole company of the Spaniards, to the number of 190 persons were set onshore ... But before his departure, he took out of this great ship two young lads born in Japan, which could both write and read their own language.

The oldest one was about 20 years old and named Christopher (He is so named in English sources, but his original (Christian) name must have been Cristóbal or Cristóvão). The younger one was named Cosmas (probably Cosme or Gusmão) and was 16. Both of them were said to be very capable. They had converted to Catholicism back in Japan, where Iberian missions were flourishing since the 1540s. They were probably fluent to some degree in Portuguese or Castilian. (Under the Treaties of Tordesillas and Zaragoza, only Portuguese ships and mission could trade and establish in Asia. However, ships were crewed by Spaniards and Portuguese as both Kingdoms were under a dynastic union at the time).

Among the Spanish crew which was put ashore was the explorer Sebastián Vizcaíno, who would later play an essential role in the development of relations between New Spain and Japan.

=== Indian Ocean, Atlantic and England travels ===
Cavendish continued across the Pacific Ocean and the Indian Ocean back to England. The two Japanese accompanied him all along, and probably stayed in England for about 3 years, since they are subsequently mentioned during the next mission of Cavendish to the Southern Atlantic, not in Hakluyt's Voyages, but in the writings of Samuel Purchas ("The admirable adventures and strange fortunes of Master Antonie Knivet, which went with Master Thomas Candish in his second voyage to the South Sea. 1591").

=== Brazil and the Southern Atlantic ===
Cavendish indeed left Plymouth for Brazil in August 1591, on a trip in which he would eventually lose his life. Parchas describes the role the two Japanese played in the hanging of a Portuguese man accompanying them on the ship:

The two Japanese whom Cavendish brought from his first voyage plotted to kill a poor Portuguese man in the following way (they denounced him to the Admiral out of jealousy). The Portuguese had mistakenly put his trust on them, as fellow Catholics -and, to some degree, Portuguese or Spanish speakers- kidnapped by English pirates. As the Admiral was seated having diner, the two Japanese came to his cabin, and speaking in a loud voice so that everybody could hear them, explained that the Portuguese man sailing with them was a traitor, who had repeatedly proposed them to flee to Brazil. And that he told them that, if God allowed the Admiral's desire to conquer the city of Santos, he would guide them to the southern seas, where they could get considerable reward in exchange for information. Based on this denunciation, the poor Portuguese man was hanged.

Christopher further appears in Knivet's diaries:

From our departure from England to our arrival in Santos, I had a very friendly relationship with the Japanese Christopher. This is because he had such an interesting personal history. This Indian and myself became very intimate with each other, so that we did not hide anything from each other. Since I had been trusting him for a long time, I told him about the gold I had found under the bed of a monk [during the attack of Santos]. He also talked about the gold he had found. We decided to split our money in two, by the grace of God. After four days, when time came to leave, he told me that the season was not good for sailing, and that we should hide our money ashore and leave it there. I became convinced, and agreed to what he was recommending. Secretly, we decided that, the day we were supposed to leave, he would go in a canoe with the gold, and hide it ashore. That morning, I gave him all my money, and he promised that he would return within two hours. I waited for five hours, and I thought I would have to wait for all my life. It finally turned out that he had already returned to the boat instead. Things finally turned out well, I obtained my money back, but our friendship was over from that day.

It is unclear from this passage whether Christopher actually tried to steal the gold from Knivet, or if the event resulted from a misunderstanding.

From this point, Christopher and Cosmas are not mentioned again in any sources. Cavendish and his ship Lester nearly met with disaster in the Strait of Magellan. Upon returning to Brazil they had a battle with the Portuguese, in which most of the men under Cavendish were killed. Cavendish took Lester across the ocean to Saint Helena, but his ship then disappeared. Christopher and Cosmas probably died as well during these events.

By going as far as the Strait of Magellan, Christopher and Cosmas came close to completing the first Japanese circumnavigation of the world. This would not happen until 1837 with the travels of Otokichi. (In 1804, the crew members of the Wakamiya-maru, who were castaways on Unalaska, Alaska, unintentionally accomplished this feat via Russian Empire with Nikolai Rezanov.)

== Other Japanese travels ==
Christopher and Cosmas represent one of the first mentions of the travels of Japanese men across the Pacific. They illustrate the participation of Japanese sailors to the trans-Pacific trade of the Manila galleons, and also the willingness of contemporary ships to take on board sailors of various nationalities.

Numerous voyages would follow during the following century. Between 1598 and 1640, red seal ships would ply the Pacific for Asian trade, and embassies on Japanese-built Western-style ships would be sent to the Americas, in the persons of Tanaka Shōsuke (1610) and Hasekura Tsunenaga (1614).

In the end, following the first contacts with the West in 1543, the Japanese acquired the skills of transoceanic voyages and Western shipbuilding, before losing them with the closing of the country (sakoku) in 1640.

The next Japanese to reach England were likely the trio of Iwakichi, Kyukichi, and Otokichi in 1835, who had drifted across the Pacific in 1834 after being blown off course.
