= Morrison incident =

1837 Japanese bombardment of a US ship

Japanese drawing of the Morrison, anchored in front of Uraga in 1837.

The Morrison incident (モリソン号事件, Morison-gō Jiken) of 1837 occurred when the American merchant ship Morrison, headed by Charles W. King, was driven away from "sakoku" (isolationist) Japan by cannon fire. This was carried out in accordance with the Japanese Edict to Repel Foreign Vessels of 1825. It has been alleged that King used the pretext of repatriating seven Japanese castaways, among them Yamamoto Otokichi, to try to open trade with Japan.

== History ==
In addition to its commercial aims, the ship was attempting to repatriate seven shipwrecked Japanese citizens who had been picked up in Macau. It also carried Christian missionaries such as Samuel Wells Williams.

In July 1837, Charles W. King set off with the seven Japanese aboard an American merchant ship called the SS Morrison, on which he sailed to Uraga at the entrance of Edo Bay. The ship had been disarmed to signify its peaceful intentions.

Cannon were fired from the hilltops of the Miura Peninsula as soon as the ship approached Uraga, in compliance with the 1825–42 shogunal order that any approaching Western ships, apart from Dutch ones, should be fired upon.

King anchored at a safe distance, out of range of the shore batteries. Men from several small fishing ships boarded the SS Morrison, and sake and cookies were shared until late in the night. By daybreak, however, cannons had been brought closer to the seaside, and they were again fired at the ship. Hundreds of small boats, each with a small cannon at the front, also started to surround and attack the ship. The Morrison sailed away, with little damage.

King then sailed to Kagoshima in Kyūshū. The first day he met some officials there, who took two of the castaways into custody. The following day, a fisherman came alongside and warned the sailors to leave immediately. As the ship was setting its sails, the Japanese opened fire from cannons they had moved to the proximity of the ship during the night. King decided to abandon the mission and returned to Canton with the remaining castaways.

King was outraged by the Japanese response, and upon his return to the United States in 1839 wrote a book about his adventure. In the book he explained that the American flag had been fired upon by a foreign government and that the next contacts with Japan "had better be left to the stronger and wiser action of the American Government".

In 1845, a resolution was introduced to the United States Congress to open Japan to trade. Although the resolution was never passed, the United States government sent an expedition under James Biddle with two heavily armed ships, to induce Japan to negotiate.

The nature of the ship's mission became known one year after the event, and this resulted in increased criticism of the Edict.

== Fictional depictions ==
- King's visit to Japan was briefly depicted during the opening episode of the 2008 NHK Taiga drama Atsuhime.

== Notes ==
Among the Japanese castaways was Otokichi, who became known for his role in bridging the cultural gap between Japan and rest of the world. Otokichi was one of three survivors of the 1834 wreck of Hojunmaru near Cape Flattery, which, damaged, had drifted for over a year across the ocean. The three were the first Japanese to visit what is now Washington state, as well as the first to visit London.

== Bibliography ==
- Cullen, L. M. (2003). A History of Japan, 1582–1941: Internal and External Worlds. Cambridge: Cambridge University Press. ISBN 0-521-82155-X (cloth); ISBN 0-521-52918-2 (paper)
- Sewall, John S. (1905). The Logbook of the Captain's Clerk: Adventures in the China Seas, Bangor, Maine: Chas H. Glass & Co. [reprint by Chicago: R. R. Donnelly & Sons, 1995] ISBN 0-548-20912-X
