= Francis Pretty =

English diarist

- Occupation: Man-at-Arms
- Writing career
- Language: English
- Period: Elizabethan
- Genre: Diarist
- Subject: Exploration

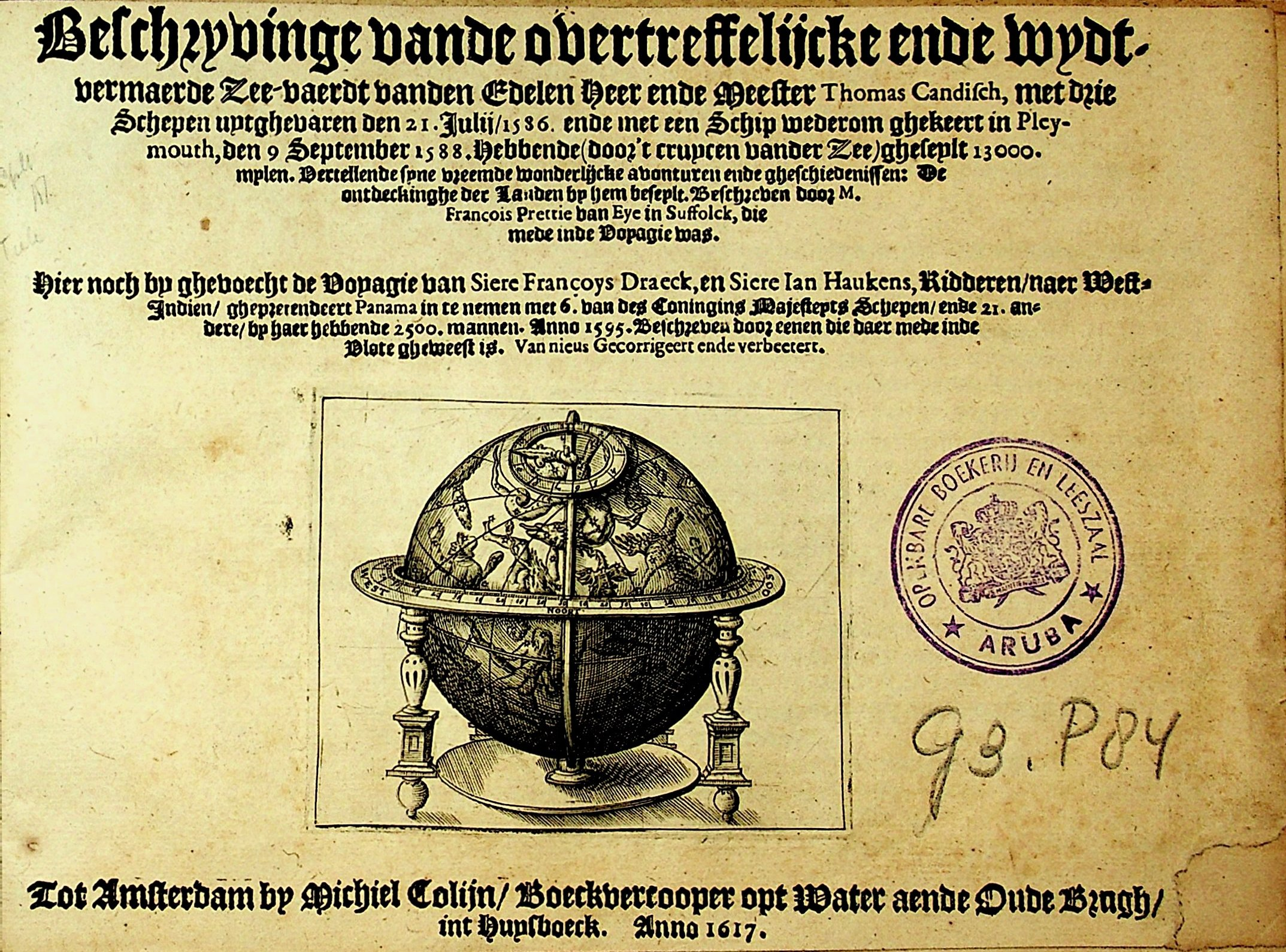
Title page of the 1617 edition of Emanuel van Meteren's publication of Pretty's diaries in Dutch

Francis Pretty was a Suffolk gentleman, diarist, sailor, and man-at-arms, who wrote a detailed account of the circumnavigation of the globe with Thomas Cavendish (1588). Due to the dubious legality of the expedition, accounts were officially suppressed; the earliest unofficial accounts were published in Dutch by Emanuel van Meteren who purchased the diary. Excerpts of the diary were also included in Richard Hakluyt's 1582 and 1589 treatises on British explorations of North America, before he published the Cavendish diary in its entirety in 1600.

Pretty is also often credited for the account of Sir Francis Drake's circumnavigation (1577–1580). According to Henry Raup Wagner however, it is highly unlikely if not impossible for Pretty to have written the account, as there is no evidence that he took part in that expedition, while there is evidence that he did not do so. This is the account of Drake's expedition, in which the privateer's contact with native peoples along the coast near 38°N (present-day California) is mentioned. There Drake would have left "a plate, nailed upon a faire great poste, whereupon was ingraven her Maiesties name, the day and yeere of our arrivall there, with the free giving up of the province and people into her Maiesties hands, together with her highnes picture and armes, in a peece of six pence of current English money, under the plate, where under was also written the name of our Generall." This description provided the basis for the Drake's Plate hoax.
