= François Le Fort =

16th century French-born merchant and navigator

François Le Fort was a merchant and navigator from Vitré, Ille-et-Vilaine, Kingdom of France. In the 16th century, he was a member of the city council of Antwerp, as the member representing the Barber's Guild.
