= Emanuel van Meteren =

Flemish historian, consul for Low Countries traders in London (1535–1612)

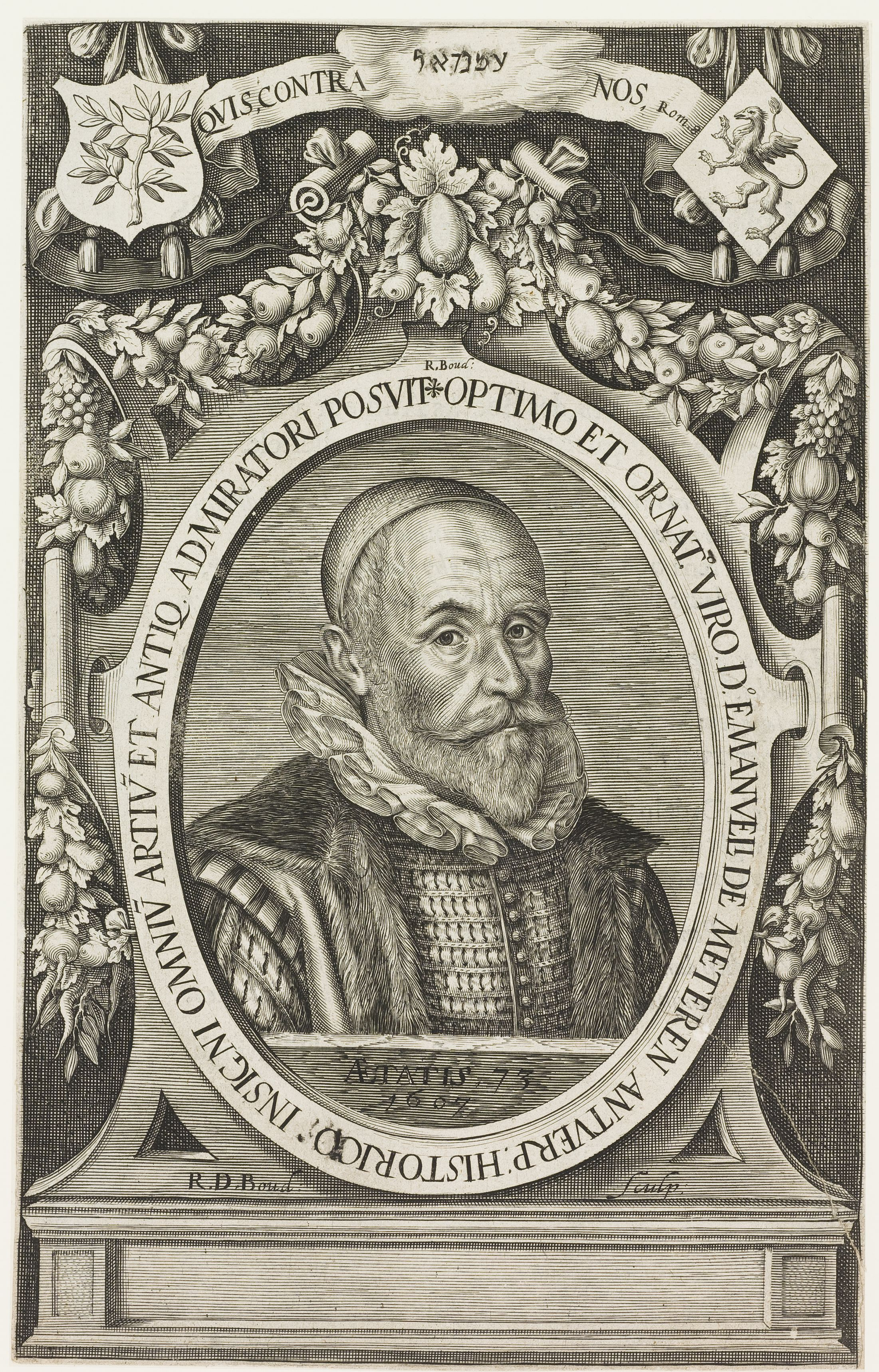
Emanuel van Meteren

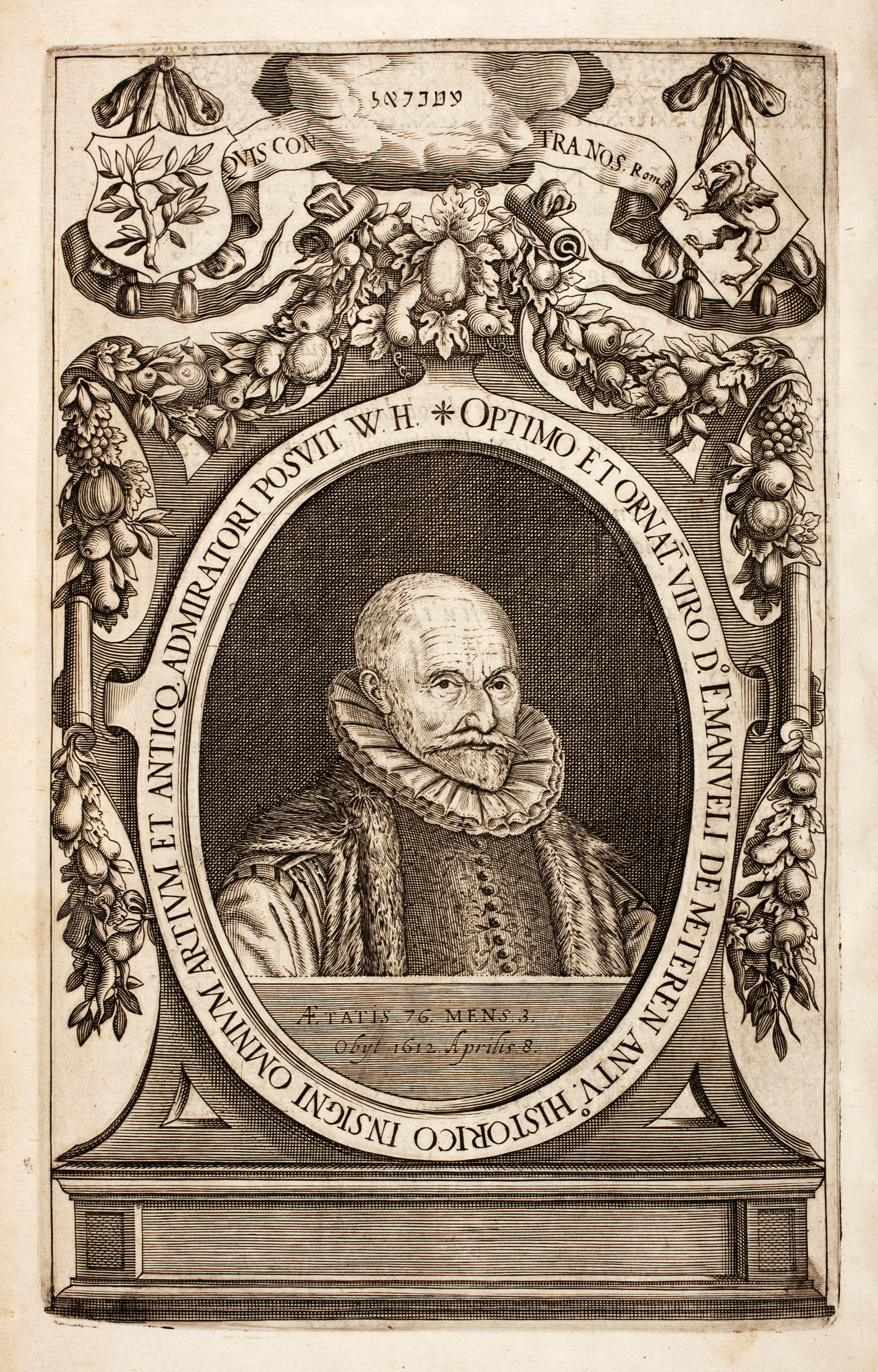
Emanuel van Meteren, from his book Historien der Nederlanden, en haar naburen oorlogen tot het iaar 1612, 1614

Emanuel van Meteren or Meteeren (1535 – 11 April 1612) was a Flemish historian and Consul for "the Traders of the Low Countries" in London. He was born in Antwerp, the son of Sir Jacobus van Meteren, Dutch financier and publisher of early English versions of the Bible, and Ottilia Ortellius, of the famous Ortellius family of mapmakers, and cousin of the cartographer Abraham Ortelius.

== Biographical notes ==
As a historian Van Meteren was special in that he was not merely a chronicler of the events of his time, but also a powerful and wealthy man who influenced those events:

The van Meteren family...had fled the Netherlands for religious reasons. Van Meteren’s father, Jacob, played a key role in the publication of the first English Bible in the 1530s, and the family established itself as a pillar of the Protestant refugee community in London. As an adult, Emmanuel lived on Lime Street, became the consul for the Dutch merchants in London, and occupied the all-important office of postmaster. Reliable mail service was an essential component of any natural history network, since specimens ranging from tulip bulbs to rhinoceros horns needed to circulate between interested naturalists. Accompanying these specimens, of course, were the letters on which the European natural history community in particular, and the Republic of Letters more generally, depended in order to thrive...[V]an Meteren’s skillful management of the post...made him indispensable. When the artist Marcus Gheeraerts wanted to send smoked herring to Antwerp, or Ortelius wanted gifts to arrive at his sister’s house in London, they inevitably went through Emmanuel van Meteren and his formidable network of middlemen, merchants, sailors, and travelers to ensure that precious messages and gifts reached their destination.

In 1581 he was the Consul representing Dutch merchants in London. In that year, William the Silent, Prince of Orange, enlisted van Meteren's help in a bit of subterfuge in a larger effort to undermine the plots of Bernardino de Mendoza, Spain's Ambassador at the Court of Queen Elizabeth. William enlisted a ship's captain, Willem Janszoon van Hoorn, to pretend to accept a bribe from de Mendoza; to avoid trickery, de Mendoza held van Hoorn's son as a hostage. Since trickery was indeed intended, William sent his fourth secretary, Christiaen, to sneak the boy out of the Spanish Embassy in London, at which point van Meteren concealed them and helped effect their escape.

In 1599 van Meteren wrote a book titled Belgische ofte Nederlandsche Historie van onzen Tijden, detailing the events of the first part of the Eighty Years' War between the Netherlands and Spain. Some of the accounts detail events that van Meteren actually witnessed. For instance he was with Maurice of Orange during the siege of Zaltbommel by the Spaniards.

After Henry Hudson returned from his second voyage he related to van Meteren that there had been a mutiny in 1609, originating in quarrels between Dutch and English sailors. Van Meteren had access to Hudson's journals, charts and logbooks, and recorded these events in Historie der Nederlanden.

He also chronicled the adventures and demise of the French merchant François Le Fort.

Van Meteren is also the author of Historia Belgica.

== Publications ==
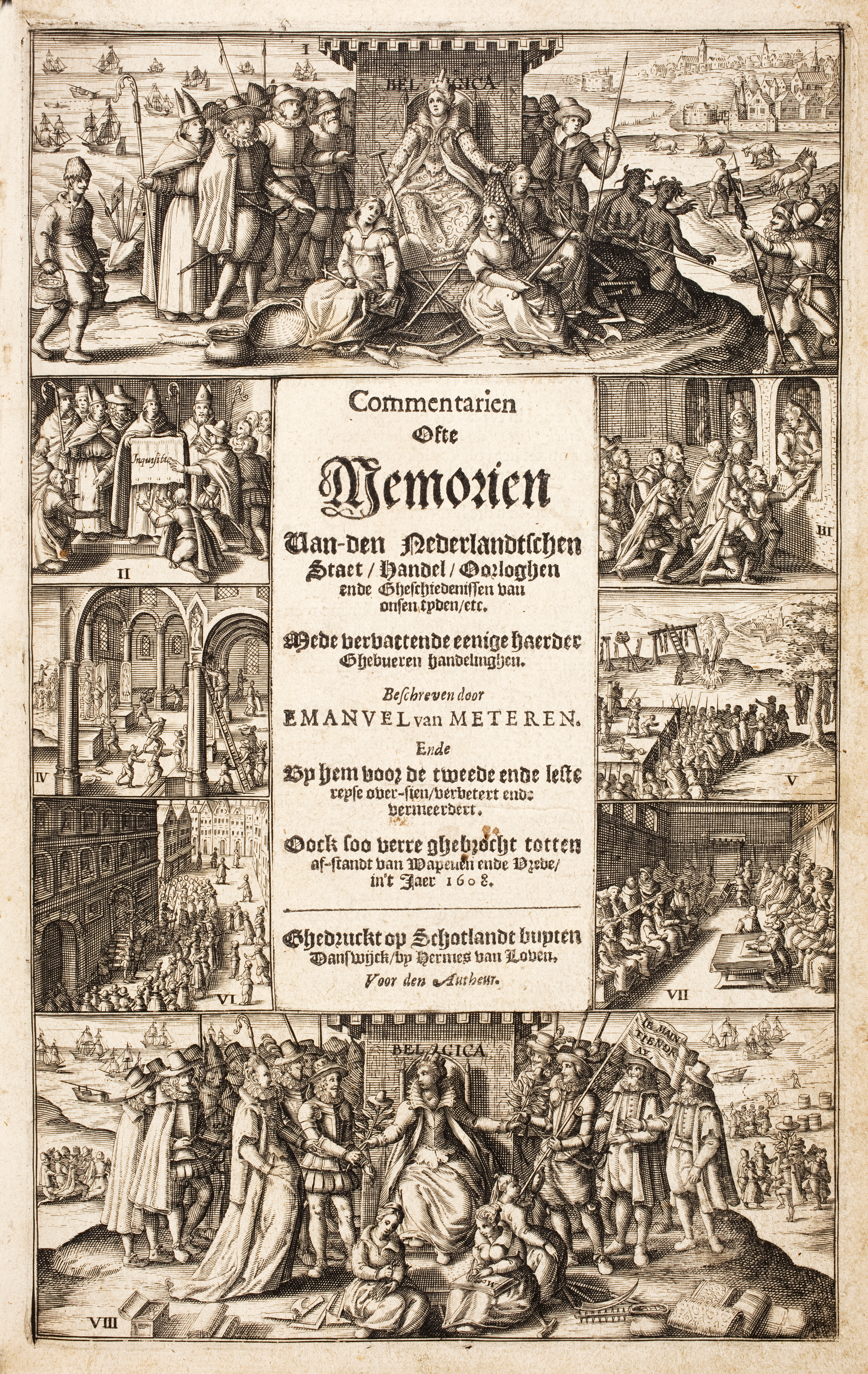
Title page of Commentarien Ofte Memorien (1608), illustrating historical events from the Eighty Years' War

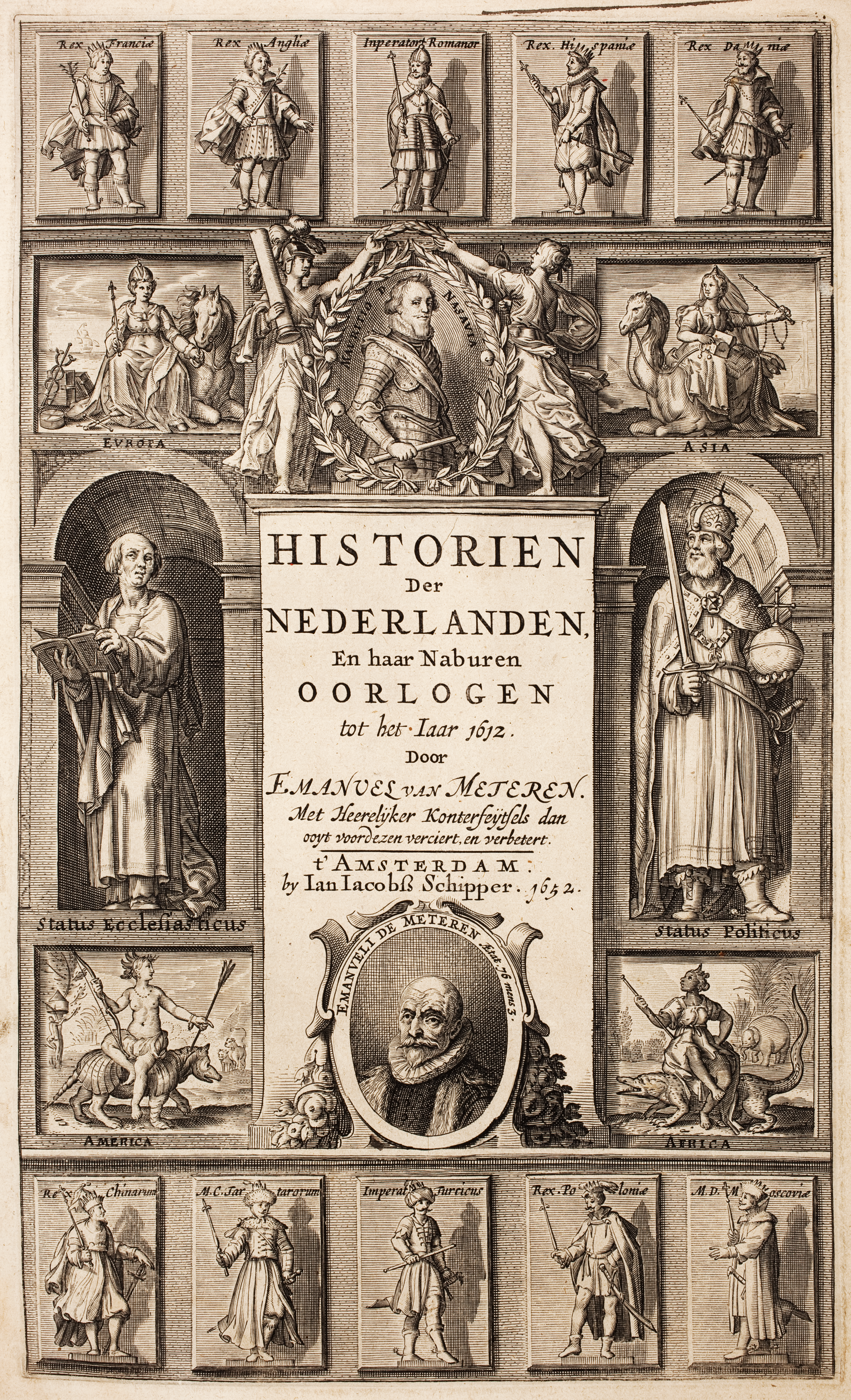
Title page of Historien der Nederlanden, edition of 1652

- (in Dutch) translation of Francis Pretty: Beschryvinge van de overtreffelijcke, ende wijdtvermaerde zee-vaerdt vanden ... Thomas Candish ... den 21 julij, 1586, ende in Pleymouth, den 9. September 1588 ... Beschreven door M. François Prettie ... Hier noch by ghevoecht de voyagie van Sire Françoys Draeck, en Sire Ian Haukens, near West-Indien, Amsterdam 1598
- (in Dutch) Memorien der Belgische ofte Nederlantsche historie, van onsen tijden. : Inhodende hoe de Nederlanden aenden anderen ghehecht, ende aen Spaengien ghecomen zijn: ... : Meest onder de regeeringhe van Philippus de II. coninc van Spaengien, tot synen doot, ende den vvtgaenden Iare 1598; verciert met een caerte van allede Nederlanden, ende aller regeerders afbeeldinghe in coper ghesneden, Delft 1599
- (in English) A true discourse historical of the succeeding governours in the Netherlands : London 1602.
- (in Dutch) Belgische ofte Nederlandtsche historie van onsen tijden : inhoudende hoe de Nederlanden aenden anderen gehecht, ende aen Spaengten ghecomen zijn: met de oorsaken der inlantsche beroerten, ende oorlogen der selver ..., Delft 1605
- (in Dutch) Commentarien ofte Memorien van-den Nederlandtschen staet, handel, oorloghen ende gheschiedenissen van onsen tyden, etc. Mede vervattende eenige haerder ghebueren handelinghen, 1608
- (in Dutch) Commentarien ofte memorien van-den Nederlandtschen staet / handel / oorloghen ende gheschiedenissen van onsen tyden / etc. : Mede vervattende eenige haerder ghelbueren handelinghen. Mit vestaende in twaelf Boecken / beginnende vant twintichste af / tot het een en dertichste Boer / ende daer in ghebrocht de Gheschiedenissen tot den Jare 1610, 1610
- (in German) Niederlandische historien oder geschichten aller deren handel : so sich zugetragen von anfangs desz Niederlandischen kriegs biss auff das jahr 1611 in Niederlandischer sprach beschrieben and in 28 bucher verfast, Antwerpen 1612
- (in Dutch) Belgische ofte Nederlantsche oorlogen ende gheschiedenissen : beginnende van t'iaer 1598 tot 1611 mede vervatende enighe haerder gebueren handelinghe, 1611
- (in Dutch) Emanuels van Meteren historie der Neder-landscher ende haerder na-buren oorlogen ende geschiedenissen, tot den iare M. VI.c XII. : Nu de laestemael bij hem voor sijne doodt merckelijck verbetert en[de] in, XXXII, boecken voltrocken, is mede' hier by gevoegt des autheurs leven. ... Gedruckt int jaer Ons Heeren. M. DC. XIV., 1614
- (in German) Eigentlich und volkomene historische beschreibung des Niderlendischen Kriegs, Arnhem 1614
- Emanvelis van Meteren Historie der Nederlandscher geschiedenissen, van den jaere 1566. tot den jaere 1612. in het corte ghebracht : ende van den jaere 1612. tot den jaer 1618. ghecontinueert ende vermeerdert, 1618
- (in French) with Jean de la Haye: L'histoire des Pays-Bas d'Emanuel de Meteren, ou, Recueil des guerres, et choses memorables advenues tant és dits Pays, qu'és Pays voysins, depuis l'an 1315 iusques à l'an 1612, 1618
- (in German) Niderländischer Histori Emanuel van Meteren Supplementum, darinn was sich vom Jahr 1613 biss auff gegenwertiges 1620 gedenckwirdiges fast in der gantzen Welt sich zugetragen begriffen, Arnheim 1620
- (in Dutch) Emanvels van Meteren Historie der Neder-landscher ende haerder na-buren oorlogen ende geschiedenissen, tot den iare M.VIC.XII. : nu de laestemael bij hem voor sijne doodt merckelijck verbetert en̄ in XXXII boecken voltrocken, is mede hier by gevoegt des autheurs leven. Verrijckt beneffens de land-caerte met by na hondert correcte conterfeijtsels vande voor treflijcste personagien in dese historie verhaelt alle cierlijck na d'leven ghedaen ende in coperen platen gesteken gedruckt int jaer ons Heeren. M.DC.XIV., 1623
- (in Dutch) Historie van de oorlogen en geschiedenissen der Nederlanderen, en der zelver naburen : beginnende met den jare 1315, en eindigende met den jare 1611
- (in English) "Pictures of the English in Queen Elizabeth's Reign", in England as seen by foreigners in the days of Elizabeth and James the First by William Brenchley Rye, London: J. R. Smith 1865
- (in Dutch) Het album van Emanuel van Meteren. H.C. Rogge, ed., 's Gravenhage 1898

== Sources ==
- Harkness, Deborah E. (2007). The Jewel House: Elizabethan London and the Scientific Revolution. Binghamton, New York: Vail-Ballou Press. ISBN 978-0300185751.
