= Oguri Jukichi =

Japanese sailor

Oguri Jukichi (小栗重吉, Oguri Jūkichi; 1785–1853) was a Japanese sea captain who, along with two crew members, drifted at sea between Japan and California for approximately 484 days, the longest known time that anyone has survived adrift at sea. They were also some of the first Japanese citizens known to have reached present day California.

Oguri and his fourteen-man crew, bound for Edo, were sailing off the Japanese coast in 1813 when their ship, the Tokujomaru (督乗丸), was disabled in a storm. The ship drifted across the Pacific Ocean, reaching the vicinity of Santa Barbara on the coast of Alta California, then part of New Spain, in late March 1815.

Oguri and two surviving crew members were rescued at sea by the brig Forester, under Captain William J. Pigot. According to the brig's sailing master Alexander Adams, a ship in distress was spotted on 24 March 1815, which proved to be Japanese and had lost both mast and rudder. Captain Pigot sent Adams to Tokujomaru, where he found the three survivors and brought them to Forester. Details about the rescue differ in the accounts written by Adams, Pigot, and others such as the Russian Naval Officer Otto von Kotzebue, in part due to language difficulties. Pigot said that original crew of Tokujomaru was 14 or 17, but Adams and Kotzebue said it was 35. Fourteen corpses were found in the hold by the crew of Forester. The reported time adrift varied between 13 and 18 months. The exact location of the rescue varied between reports as well, but it seems to have been up to 300 miles (480 km) west-southwest of Point Conception.

Forester, although flying a British flag, was an American vessel, owned by John Jacob Astor, intended to support Astor's Pacific Fur Company (PFC) venture based at Fort Astoria at the mouth of the Columbia River. But due to the War of 1812 the PFC had been forced to sell all its assets in 1813, including Fort Astoria, to the Montreal–based North West Company. Its original purpose lost, Captain Pigot used Forester for the maritime fur trade, in partial cooperation with the Russian American Company, which was hunting sea otters off the coast of California. Thus the rescued Japanese sailors were first taken to Bodega Bay near Fort Ross, then to Sitka, the capital of Russian America. The Forester left Sitka in June or July 1815, intending to sail to Japan to return the Japanese sailors, but having difficulty in the Kuril Islands turned back to Petropavlovsk, Kamchatka, arriving on 12 September 1815. From there Forester returned to California. In May 1816, a Russian ship took the three survivors back to Japan. One crewman died during the voyage, but Oguri and the other sailor arrived home in July 1816.

== See also ==
- Wakamiya-maru
- Nakahama Manjirō
