= Wakamiya-maru =

18th-century Japanese cargo ship

The Wakamiya-maru was a Japanese cargo ship whose crew members became the first Japanese to circumnavigate the globe after their ship went off course after getting caught in a storm en route from Ishinomaki in the Tōhoku region of northern Japan to Edo (now Tokyo) in November 1793.

== Blown off course ==
At the time, under the Tokugawa shogunate, Japan was pursuing a policy of isolation, and its borders were essentially closed. However, after sixteen days at sea, the Wakamiya-maru arrived at the island of Unalaska in the north Pacific. Then a Russian territory, the crew were rescued by Russians stationed on the island and transferred to Irkutsk. At the time, under Catherine the Great, Russia was seeking to initiate trade relations with Japan. However, Catherine the Great's death soon after the sailors' arrival in Irkutsk led to them spending seven years in the city, before being summoned to St. Petersburg shortly after Alexander I became Tsar.

== The return journey ==
Of the surviving crew members, four wished to go back to Japan, and accompanied Nikolai Petrovich Rezanov, Russia's envoy to Japan, aboard the ship Nadezhda, which left for Japan in 1803 from the port of Kronstadt, and which travelled via Copenhagen (Denmark), Falmouth (Britain), Santa Cruz (Canary Islands, Spain), Santa Catarina Island (Brazil), and Nuku Hiva (Marquesas Islands, South Pacific Ocean), arriving in Nagasaki, Japan on September 6, 1804.

Upon their return to Edo, the sailors were interrogated by the scholar Otsuki Gentaku, whose account of their travels was published as Kankai Ibun (環海異聞).

The Nadezhda's voyage was the first Russian circumnavigation of the globe, and the four Japanese sailors who returned to Japan in doing so also became the first Japanese to have circumnavigated the globe.
