= Imperial Japanese Navy =

Navy of Japan between 1868 and 1945

- 大日本帝國海軍; Dai-Nippon Teikoku Kaigun
- The ensign of the Imperial Japanese Navy
- Founded: 1871
- Disbanded: 1945
- Country: Empire of Japan
- Allegiance: Emperor of Japan
- Type: Navy
- Role: Naval warfare
- Part of: Imperial Japanese Armed Forces
- Colors: Navy blue White
- March: "Gunkan kōshinkyoku" ("Gunkan March")
- Anniversaries: 27 May
- Engagements: Invasion of Taiwan; First Sino-Japanese War; Boxer Rebellion; Russo-Japanese War; World War I; Second Sino-Japanese War; World War II

Commanders
- Commander-in-chief: Emperor of Japan
- Minister of the Navy: See list
- Chief of the Navy General Staff: See list

Insignia
- Roundel
- Ranks: Ranks of the Imperial Japanese Navy

Aircraft flown
- List of aircraft

The Imperial Japanese Navy (IJN) was the navy of the Empire of Japan from 1871 to 1945, when it was dissolved following Japan's surrender in World War II. The Japan Maritime Self-Defense Force (JMSDF) was formed between 1952 and 1954 after the dissolution of the IJN.

The IJN was the third largest navy in the world by 1920, behind the Royal Navy and the United States Navy (USN). It was supported by the Imperial Japanese Navy Air Service for reconnaissance and airstrike operations from the fleet. It was the primary opponent of the Western Allies in the Pacific War. The IJN additionally fielded limited land-based forces, including professional marines, marine paratrooper units, anti-aircraft defense units, installation and port security units, naval police units, and ad-hoc formations of sailors pressed into service as naval infantry.

The origins of the IJN date back to early interactions with nations on the Asian continent, beginning in the early feudal period and reaching a peak of activity during the 16th and 17th centuries at a time of cultural exchange with European powers during the Age of Discovery. After two centuries of stagnation during the country's ensuing seclusion policy under the shōgun of the Edo period, Japan's navy was comparatively antiquated when the country was forced open to trade by American intervention in 1854. This eventually led to the Meiji Restoration. Accompanying the re-ascendance of the Emperor came a period of frantic modernization and industrialization. The IJN saw several successes in combat during the early twentieth century, sometimes against much more powerful enemies, such as in the Sino-Japanese War and the Russo-Japanese War, before being largely destroyed in World War II.

== Origins ==
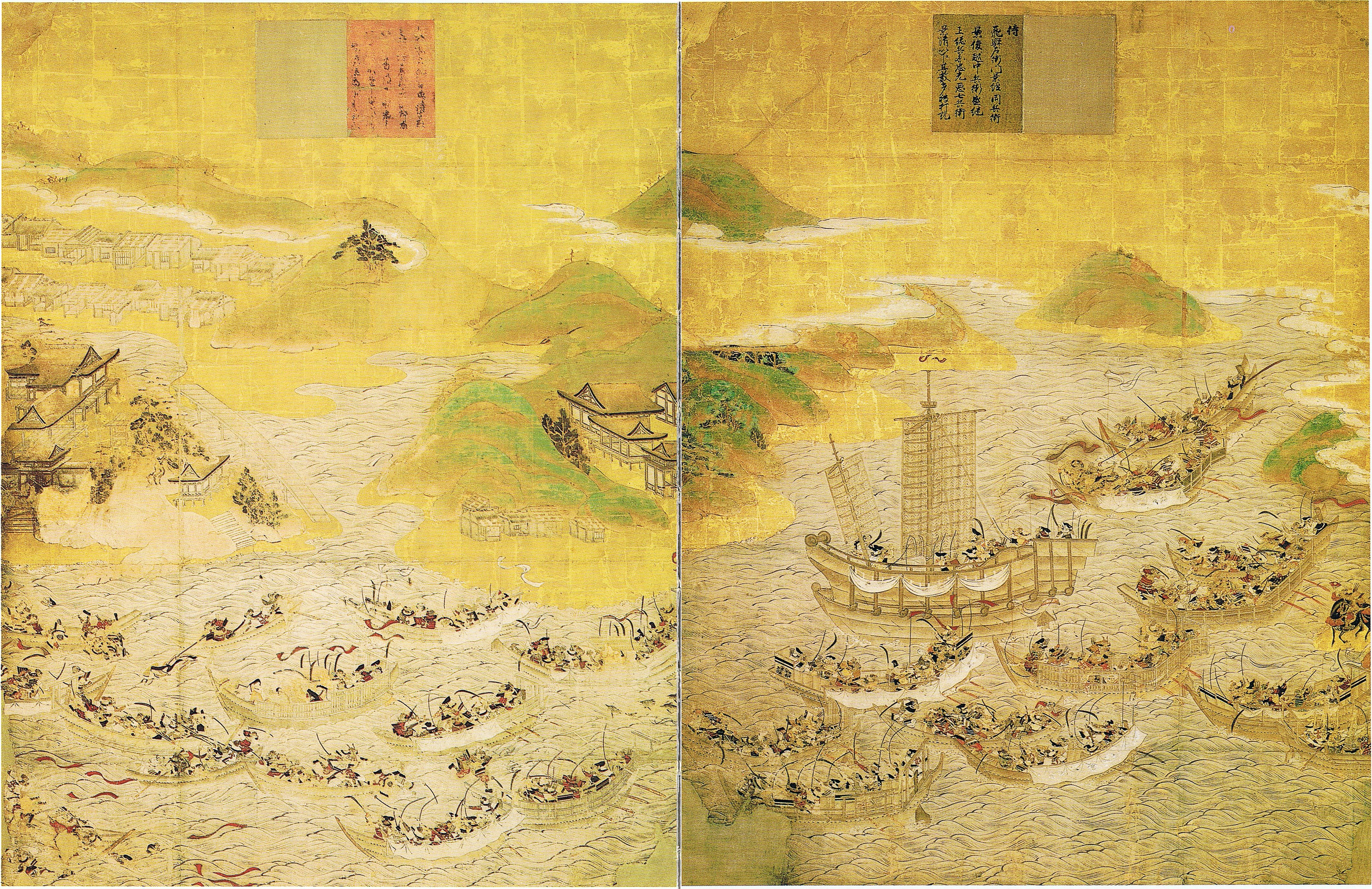
The Battle of Dan-no-ura in 1185

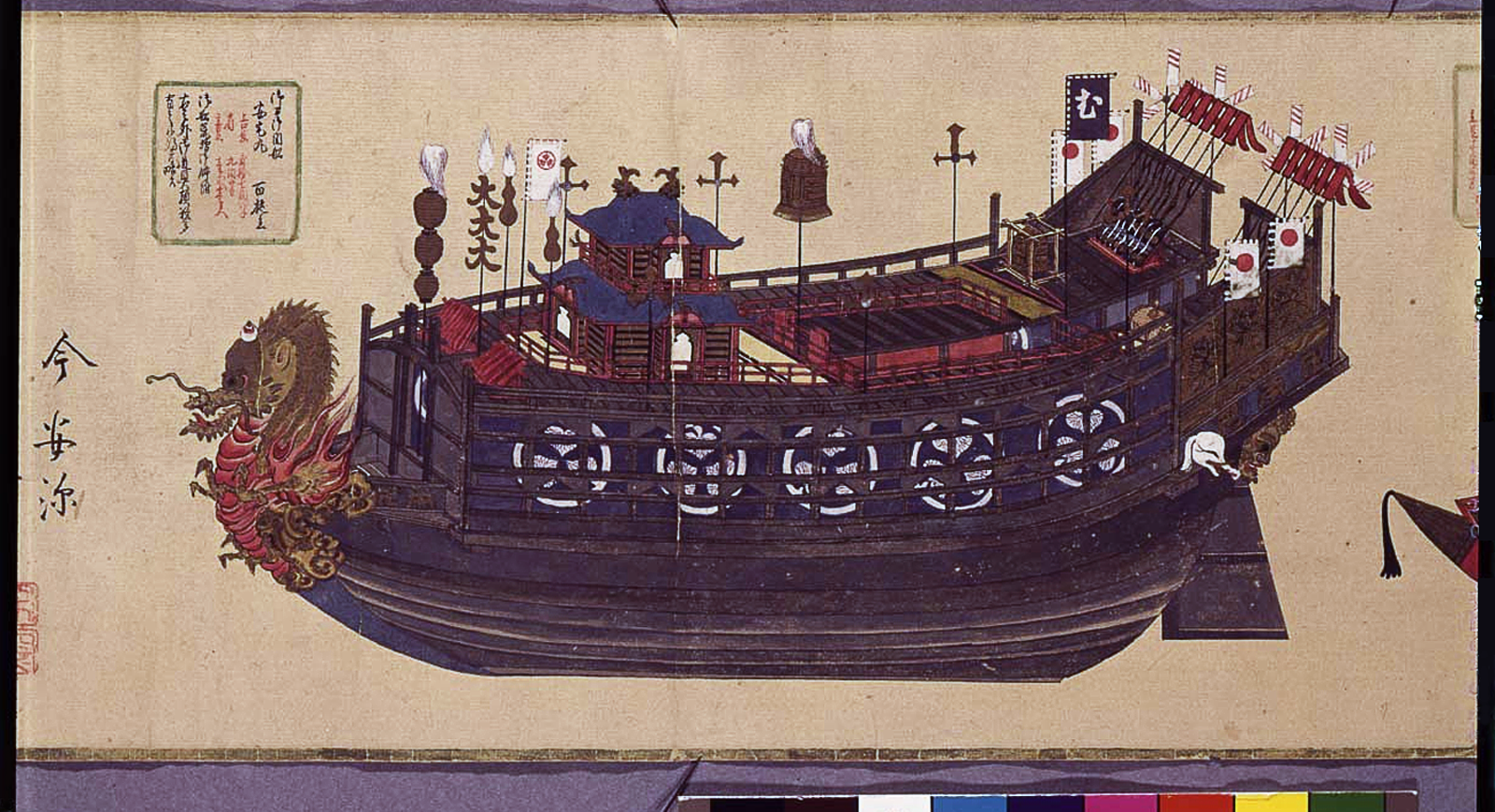
A 16th-century atakebune coastal naval war vessel, bearing the crest of the Tokugawa clan

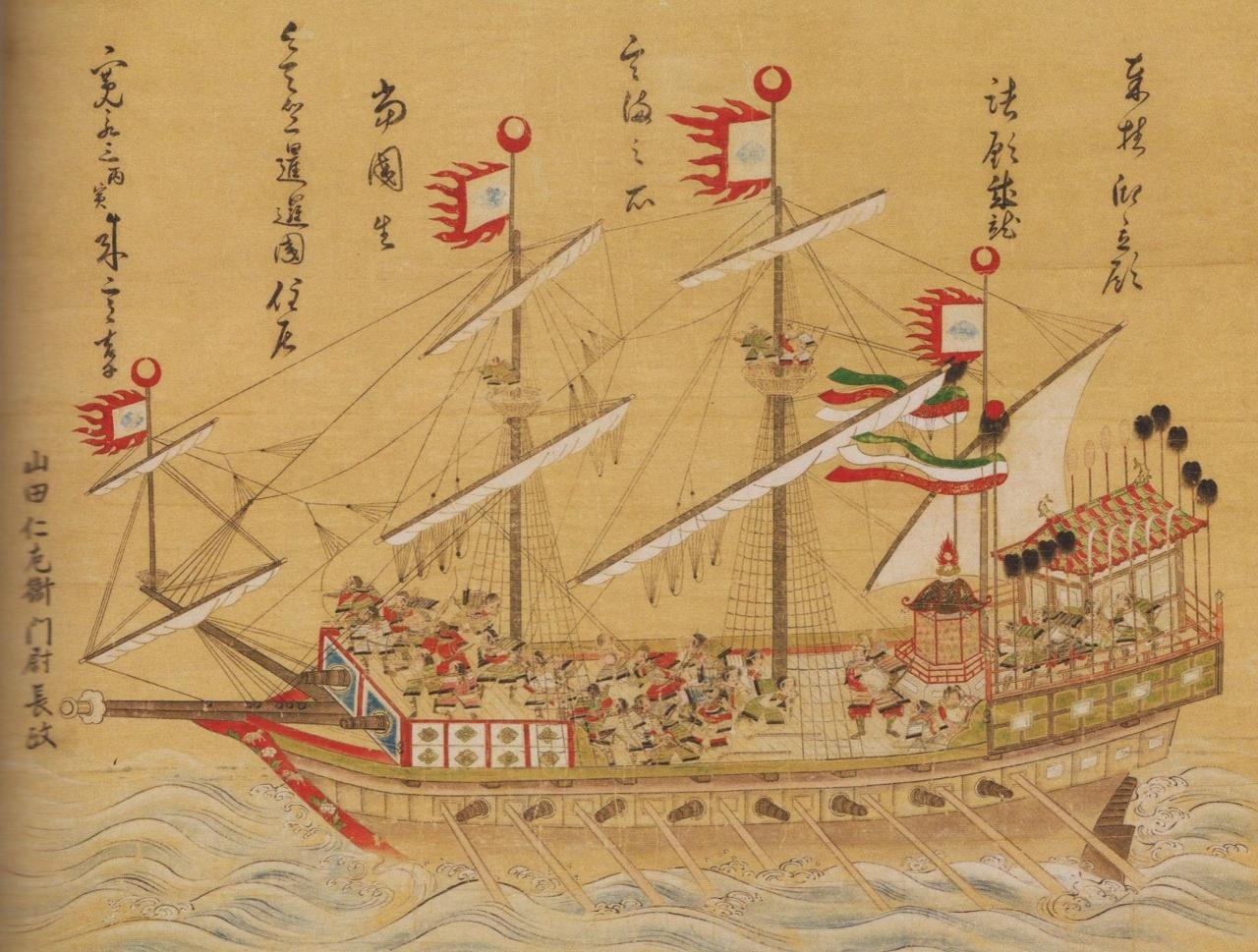
The warship of Yamada Nagamasa (1590–1630), a merchant and soldier who traveled to Ayutthaya (Thailand)

Japan has a long history of colonial naval interaction with the Asian continent, involving transportation of troops between Korea and Japan, starting at least with the beginning of the Kofun period in the 3rd century.

Following the attempts at Mongol invasions of Japan by Kubilai Khan in 1274 and 1281, Japanese wakō became very active in plundering the coast of China. In response to threats of Chinese invasion of Japan, in 1405 the shogun Ashikaga Yoshimitsu capitulated to Chinese demands and sent twenty captured Japanese pirates to China, where they were boiled in a cauldron in Ningbo.

Japan undertook major naval building efforts in the 16th century, during the Warring States period when feudal rulers vying for supremacy built vast coastal navies of several hundred ships. Around that time Japan may have developed one of the first ironclad warships when Oda Nobunaga, a daimyō, had six iron-covered Oatakebune made in 1576. In 1588 Toyotomi Hideyoshi issued a ban on Wakō piracy; the pirates then became vassals of Hideyoshi, and comprised the naval force used in the Japanese invasion of Korea (1592–1598).

Japan built her first large ocean-going warships in the beginning of the 17th century, following contacts with the Western nations during the Nanban trade period. In 1613, the daimyō of Sendai, in agreement with the Tokugawa Bakufu, built Date Maru, a 500-ton galleon-type ship that transported the Japanese embassy of Hasekura Tsunenaga to the United States of America, which then continued to Europe. From 1604 the Bakufu also commissioned about 350 Red seal ships, usually armed and incorporating some Western technologies, mainly for Southeast Asian trade.

=== Western studies and the end of seclusion ===
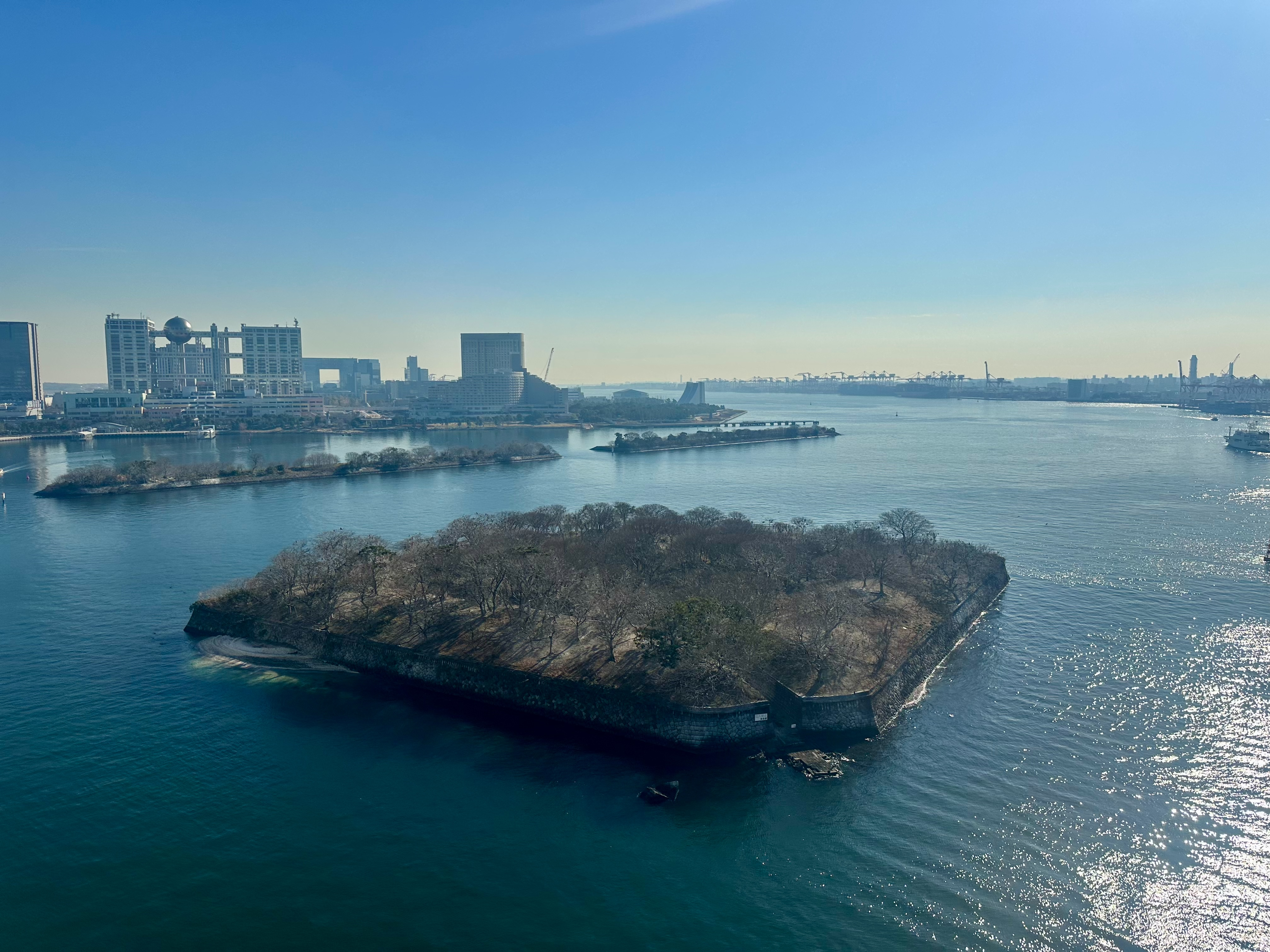
No. 6 Odaiba battery, one of the original Edo-era battery islands. These batteries are defensive structures built to withstand naval intrusions.

For more than 200 years, beginning in the 1640s, the Japanese policy of seclusion (sakoku) forbade contacts with the outside world and prohibited the construction of ocean-going ships on pain of death. Contacts were maintained, however, with the Dutch through the port of Nagasaki, the Chinese also through Nagasaki and the Ryukyus and Korea through intermediaries with Tsushima. The study of Western sciences, called rangaku, through the Dutch enclave of Dejima in Nagasaki led to the transfer of knowledge related to the Western technological and Scientific Revolution which allowed Japan to remain aware of naval sciences, such as cartography, optics and mechanical sciences. Seclusion, however, led to the loss of any naval and maritime traditions the nation possessed.

Apart from Dutch trade ships, no other Western vessels were allowed to enter Japanese ports. A notable exception was during the Napoleonic Wars when neutral ships flew the Dutch flag. Frictions with the foreign ships, however, started from the beginning of the 19th century. The Nagasaki Harbour Incident involving HMS Phaeton in 1808, and other subsequent incidents in the following decades, led the shogunate to enact an Edict to Repel Foreign Vessels. Western ships, which were increasing their presence around Japan due to whaling and the trade with China, began to challenge the seclusion policy.

The Morrison incident in 1837 and news of China's defeat during the Opium War led the shogunate to repeal the 1825 law to repel the foreign ships, and instead to adopt the 1842 Edict for the Provision of Firewood and Water that recognized the need to provide basic provisions for the visiting foreign ships. The shogunate also began to strengthen the nation's coastal defenses. Many Japanese realized that traditional ways would not be sufficient to repel further intrusions, and western knowledge was utilized through the Dutch at Dejima to reinforce Japan's capability to repel the foreigners; field guns, mortars, and firearms were obtained, and coastal defenses reinforced. Numerous attempts to open Japan ended in failure, in part to Japanese resistance, until the early 1850s.

As a part of the effort to strengthen coastal defense, western-style sailship Sōshun Maru, a small twin-mast military vessel with 22 oars, two mortar and six Japanese made Carronade-like smoothbore guns, length of 16.7m and beam of 3.9m, was built in 1849. Sōshun Maru was lost in a fire in 1850, but the design was mostly copied by nine more vessels for the protection of Edo Bay by 1853, mostly under Uraga regional office of the government manned by samurais from Aizu Han.

During 1853 and 1854, American warships under the command of Commodore Matthew Perry, entered Edo Bay and made demonstrations of force requesting trade negotiations. After two hundred years of seclusion, the 1854 Convention of Kanagawa led to the opening of Japan to international trade and interaction. This was soon followed by the 1858 Treaty of Amity and Commerce and treaties with other powers.

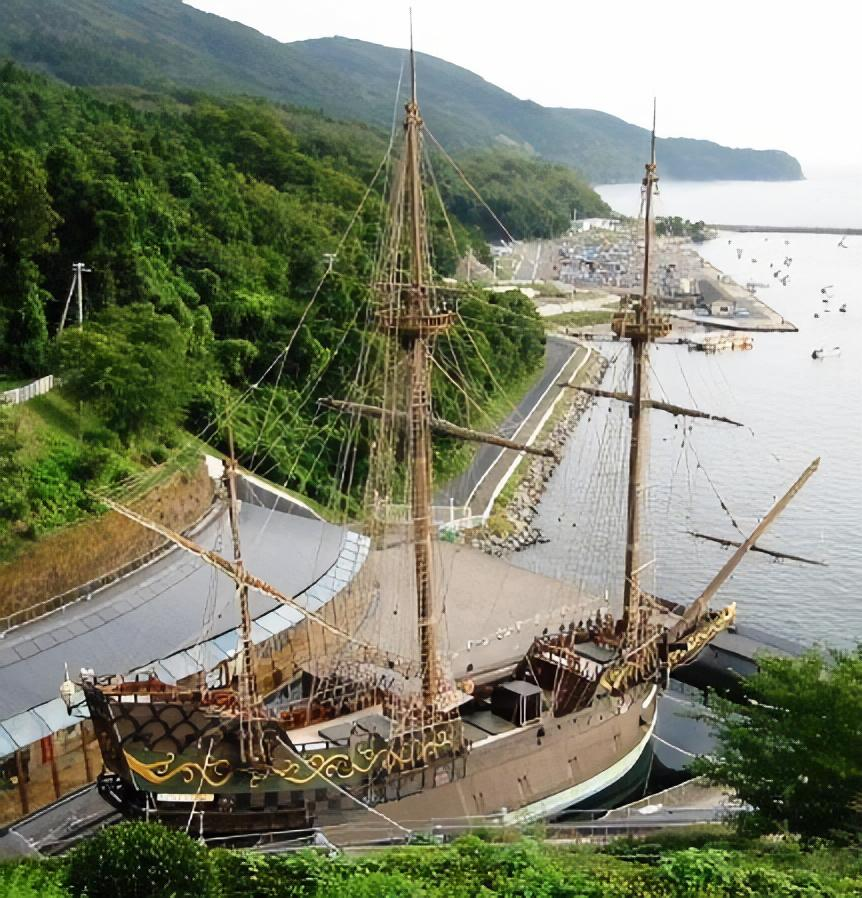
Replica of the Japanese-built 1613 galleon San Juan Bautista, in Ishinomaki

Painting of a 17th-century Red Seal Ship of the Araki clan, sailing out of Nagasaki for Annam (Vietnam)

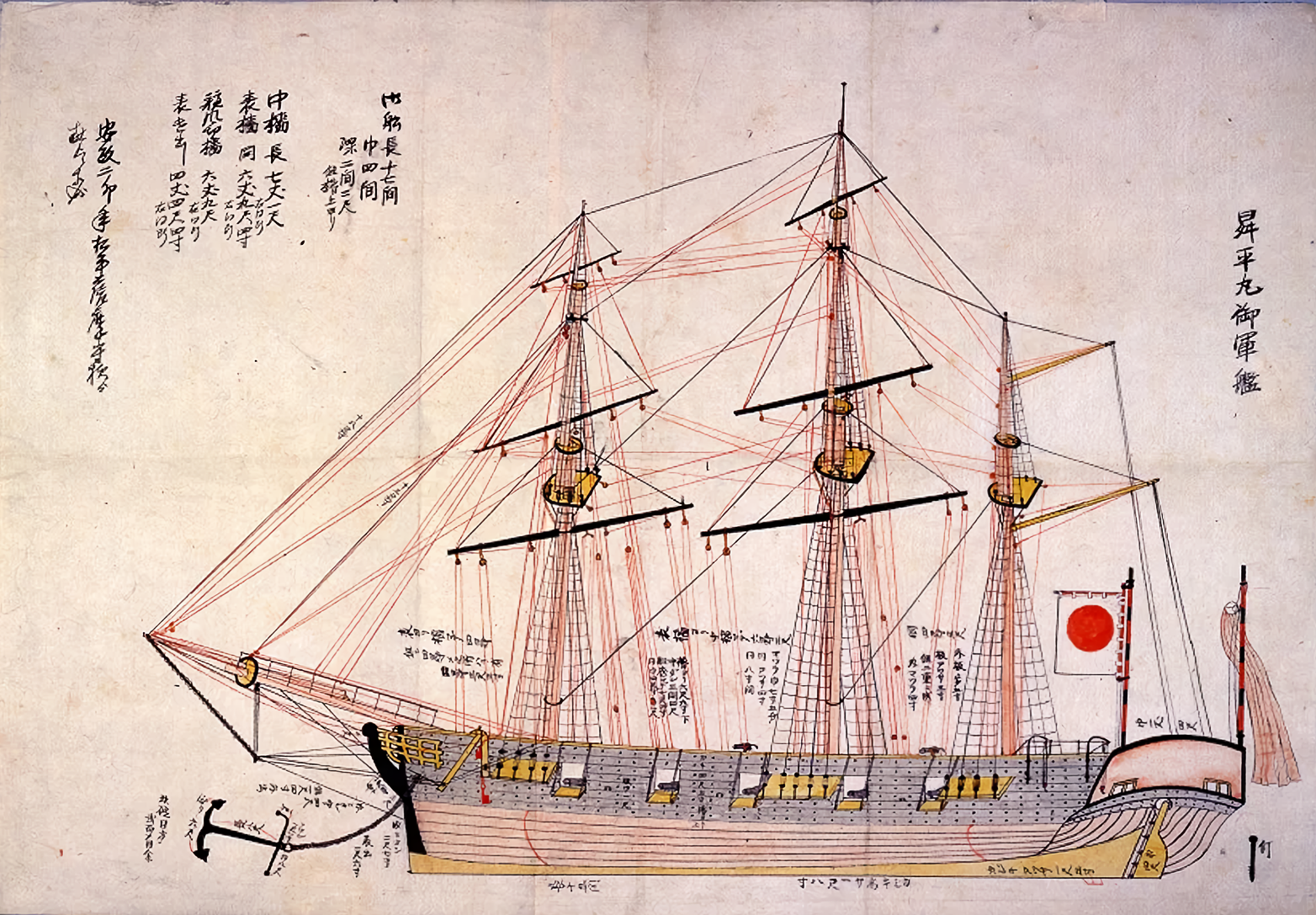
The sailing frigate Shōhei Maru (1854) was built from Dutch technical drawings.

=== Development of shogunal and domain naval forces ===
As soon as Japan opened up to foreign influences, the Tokugawa shogunate recognized the vulnerability of the country from the sea and initiated an active policy of assimilation and adoption of Western naval technologies. In 1855, with Dutch assistance, the shogunate acquired its first steam warship, Kankō Maru, and began using it for training, establishing a Naval Training Center at Nagasaki.

Samurai such as the future Admiral Enomoto Takeaki (1836–1908) was sent by the shogunate to study in the Netherlands for several years. On 8 May 1857, another Naval Training Center was completed in Edo, and the school relocated to this new facility in Tsukiji. In 1857 the shogunate acquired its first screw-driven steam warship Kanrin Maru and used it as an escort for the 1860 Japanese delegation to the United States. In 1865 the French naval engineer Léonce Verny was hired to build Japan's first modern naval arsenals, at Yokosuka and Nagasaki.

The shogunate also allowed and then ordered various domains to purchase warships and to develop naval fleets, Satsuma, especially, had petitioned the shogunate to build modern naval vessels. A naval center had been set up by the Satsuma domain in Kagoshima, students were sent abroad for training and a number of ships were acquired. The domains of Chōshū, Hizen, Tosa and Kaga joined Satsuma in acquiring ships. These naval elements proved insufficient during the Royal Navy's Bombardment of Kagoshima in 1863 and the Allied bombardments of Shimonoseki in 1863–64.

By the mid-1860s the shogunate had a fleet of eight warships and thirty-six auxiliaries. Satsuma (which had the largest domain fleet) had nine steamships, Choshu had five ships plus numerous auxiliary craft, Kaga had ten ships and Chikuzen eight. Numerous smaller domains also had acquired a number of ships. However, these fleets resembled maritime organizations rather than actual navies with ships functioning as transports as well as combat vessels; they were also manned by personnel who lacked experienced seamanship except for coastal sailing and who had virtually no combat training.

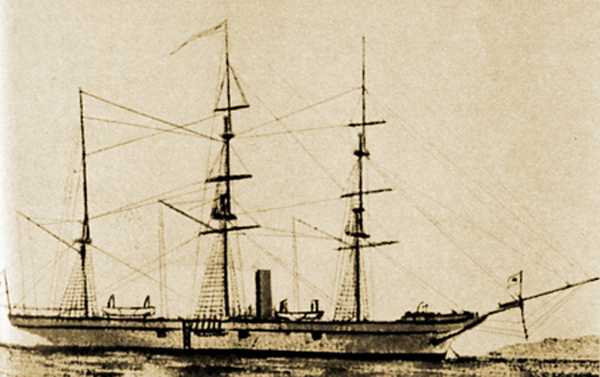
The screw-driven steam corvette Kanrin Maru, Japan's first screw-driven steam warship, 1857

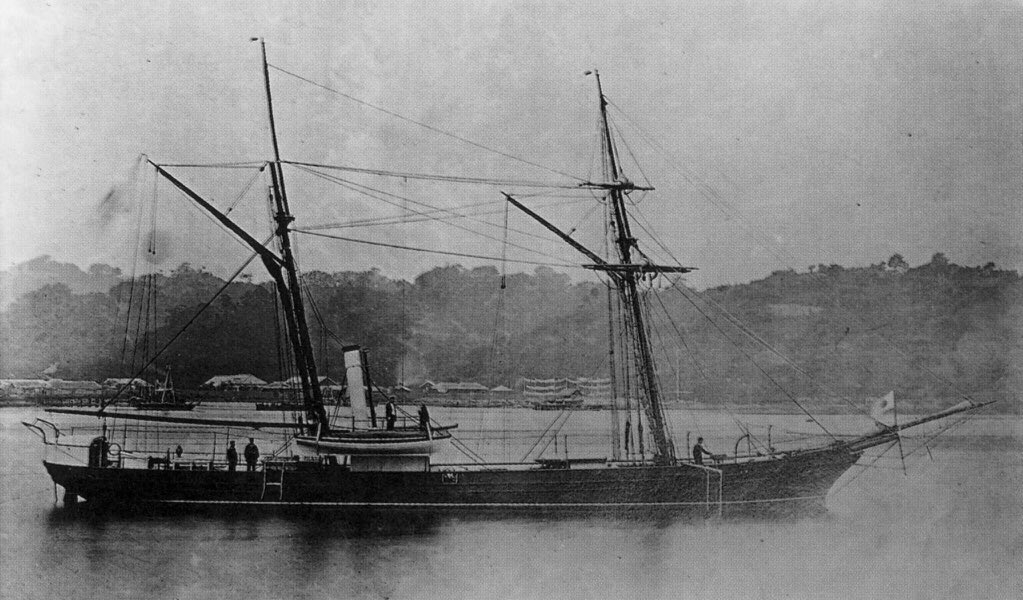
The gunboat Chiyoda, Japan's first domestically built steam warship, completed in May 1866

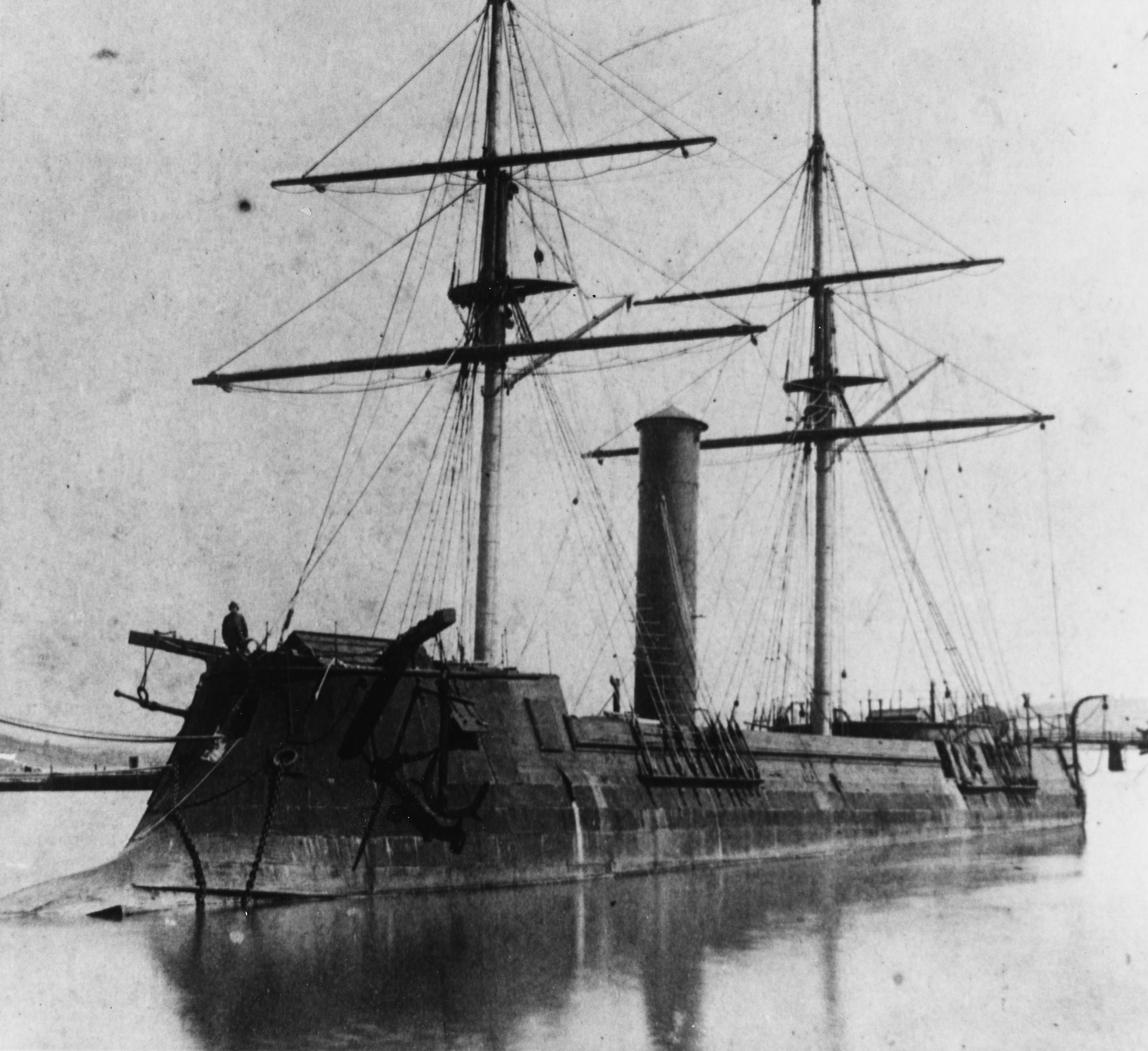
The French-built ironclad warship Kōtetsu (ex-CSS Stonewall), Japan's first modern ironclad, 1869

== Creation of the Imperial Japanese Navy (1868–1872) ==
The Meiji Restoration in 1868 led to the overthrow of the shogunate. From 1868, the newly formed Meiji government continued with reforms to centralize and modernize Japan.

=== Boshin War ===
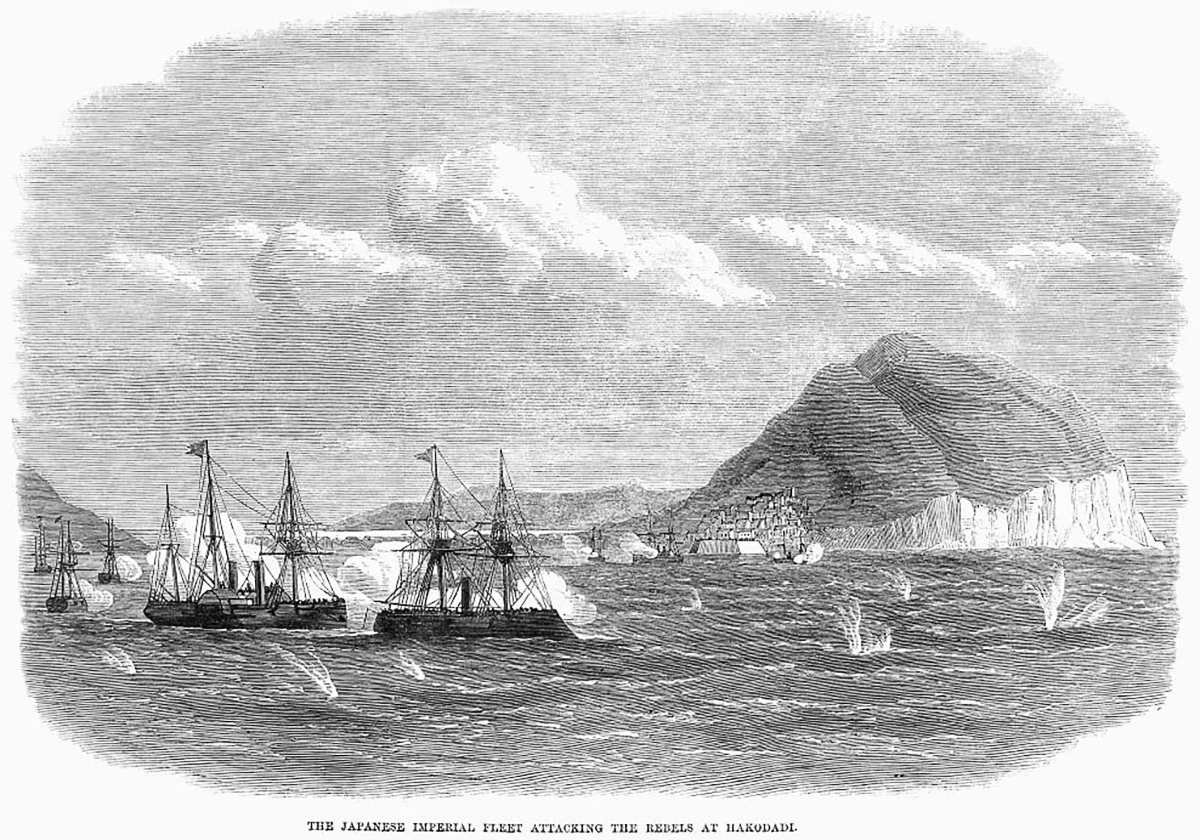
The Naval Battle of Hakodate, May 1869; in the foreground, wooden paddle steamer warship Kasuga and ironclad warship Kōtetsu of the Imperial Japanese Navy

Although the Meiji reformers had overthrown the Tokugawa shogunate, tensions between the former ruler and the restoration leaders led to the Boshin War (January 1868 to June 1869). The early part of the conflict largely involved land battles, with naval forces playing a minimal role transporting troops from western to eastern Japan. Only the Battle of Awa (28 January 1868) was significant; this also proved one of the few Tokugawa successes in the war. Tokugawa Yoshinobu eventually surrendered after the fall of Edo in July 1868, and as a result most of Japan accepted the emperor's rule, however resistance continued in the North.

On 26 March 1868 the first naval review in Japan took place in Osaka Bay, with six ships from the private domain navies of Saga, Chōshū, Satsuma, Kurume, Kumamoto and Hiroshima participating. The total tonnage of these ships was 2,252 tons, which was far smaller than the tonnage of the single foreign vessel (from the French Navy) that also participated. The following year, in July 1869, the Imperial Japanese Navy was formally established, two months after the last combat of the Boshin War.

Enomoto Takeaki, the admiral of the shōgun's navy, refused to surrender all his ships, remitting just four vessels, and escaped to northern Honshū with the remnants of the shōgun's navy: eight steam warships and 2,000 men. Following the defeat of pro-shogunate resistance on Honshū, Admiral Enomoto Takeaki fled to Hokkaidō, where he established the breakaway Republic of Ezo (27 January 1869). The new Meiji government dispatched a military force to defeat the rebels, culminating with the Naval Battle of Hakodate in May 1869. The Imperial side took delivery (February 1869) of the French-built ironclad Kotetsu (originally ordered by the Tokugawa shogunate) and used it decisively towards the end of the conflict.

=== Consolidation ===
In February 1868 the Imperial government had placed all captured shogunate naval vessels under the Navy Army affairs section. In the following months, military forces of the government came under the control of several organizations which were established and then disbanded until the establishment of the Ministry of War and of the Ministry of the Navy of Japan in 1872. For the first two years (1868–1870) of the Meiji state no national, centrally controlled navy existed – the Meiji government only administered those Tokugawa vessels captured in the early phase of the Boshin War of 1868–1869. All other naval vessels remained under the control of the various domains which had been acquired during the Bakumatsu period. The naval forces mirrored the political environment of Japan at the time: the domains retained their political as well as military independence from the Imperial government. Katsu Kaishū, a former Tokugawa navy leader, was brought into the government as Vice Minister of the Navy in 1872, and became the first Minister of the Navy from 1873 until 1878 because of his naval experience and his ability to control Tokugawa personnel who retained positions in the government naval forces. Upon assuming office Katsu Kaishu recommended the rapid centralization of all naval forces – government and domain – under one agency. The nascent Meiji government in its first years did not have the necessary political and military force to implement such a policy and so, like much of the government, the naval forces retained a decentralized structure in most of 1869 through 1870.

The incident involving Enomoto Takeaki's refusal to surrender and his escape to Hokkaidō with a large part of the former Tokugawa Navy's best warships embarrassed the Meiji government politically. The imperial side had to rely on considerable naval assistance from the most powerful domains as the government did not have enough naval power to put down the rebellion on its own. Although the rebel forces in Hokkaidō surrendered, the government's response to the rebellion demonstrated the need for a strong centralized naval force. Even before the rebellion the restoration leaders had realized the need for greater political, economic and military centralization and by August 1869 most of the domains had returned their lands and population registers to the government. In 1871 the domains were abolished altogether and as with the political context the centralization of the navy began with the domains donating their forces to the central government. As a result, in 1871 Japan could finally boast a centrally controlled navy, this was also the institutional beginning of the Imperial Japanese Navy.

In February 1872, the Ministry of War was replaced by a separate Army Ministry and Navy Ministry. In October 1873, Katsu Kaishū became Navy Minister.

== Secondary Service (1872–1882) ==
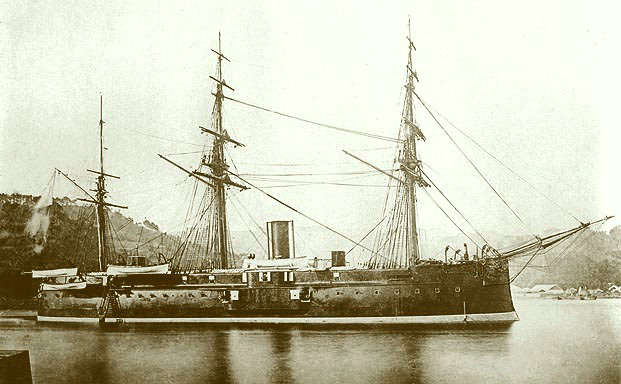
The ironclad Fusō, between 1878 and 1891

After the consolidation of the government the new Meiji state set about to build up national strength. The Meiji government honored the treaties with the Western powers signed during the Bakumatsu period with the ultimate goal of revising them, leading to a subsided threat from the sea. This however led to conflict with those disgruntled samurai who wanted to expel the westerners and with groups which opposed the Meiji reforms. Internal dissent – including peasant uprisings – become a greater concern for the government, which curtailed plans for naval expansion as a result. In the immediate period from 1868 many members of the Meiji coalition advocated giving preference to maritime forces over the army and saw naval strength as paramount. In 1870 the new government drafted an ambitious plan to develop a navy with 200 ships organized into ten fleets. The plan was abandoned within a year due to lack of resources. Financial considerations were a major factor restricting the growth of the navy during the 1870s. Japan at the time was not a wealthy state. Soon, however, domestic rebellions, the Saga Rebellion (1874) and especially the Satsuma Rebellion (1877), forced the government to focus on land warfare, and the army gained prominence.

Naval policy, as expressed by the slogan Shusei Kokubō (literally: "Static Defense"), focused on coastal defenses, on a standing army (established with the assistance of the second French military mission to Japan), and a coastal navy that could act in a supportive role to drive an invading enemy from the coast. The resulting military organization followed the Rikushu Kaijū (Army first, Navy second) principle. This meant a defense designed to repel an enemy from Japanese territory, and the chief responsibility for that mission rested upon Japan's army; consequently, the army gained the bulk of the military expenditures. During the 1870s and 1880s, the Imperial Japanese Navy remained an essentially coastal-defense force, although the Meiji government continued to modernize it. Jo Sho Maru (soon renamed Ryūjō Maru), commissioned by Thomas Glover, was launched at Aberdeen, Scotland on 27 March 1869.

=== British support and influence ===
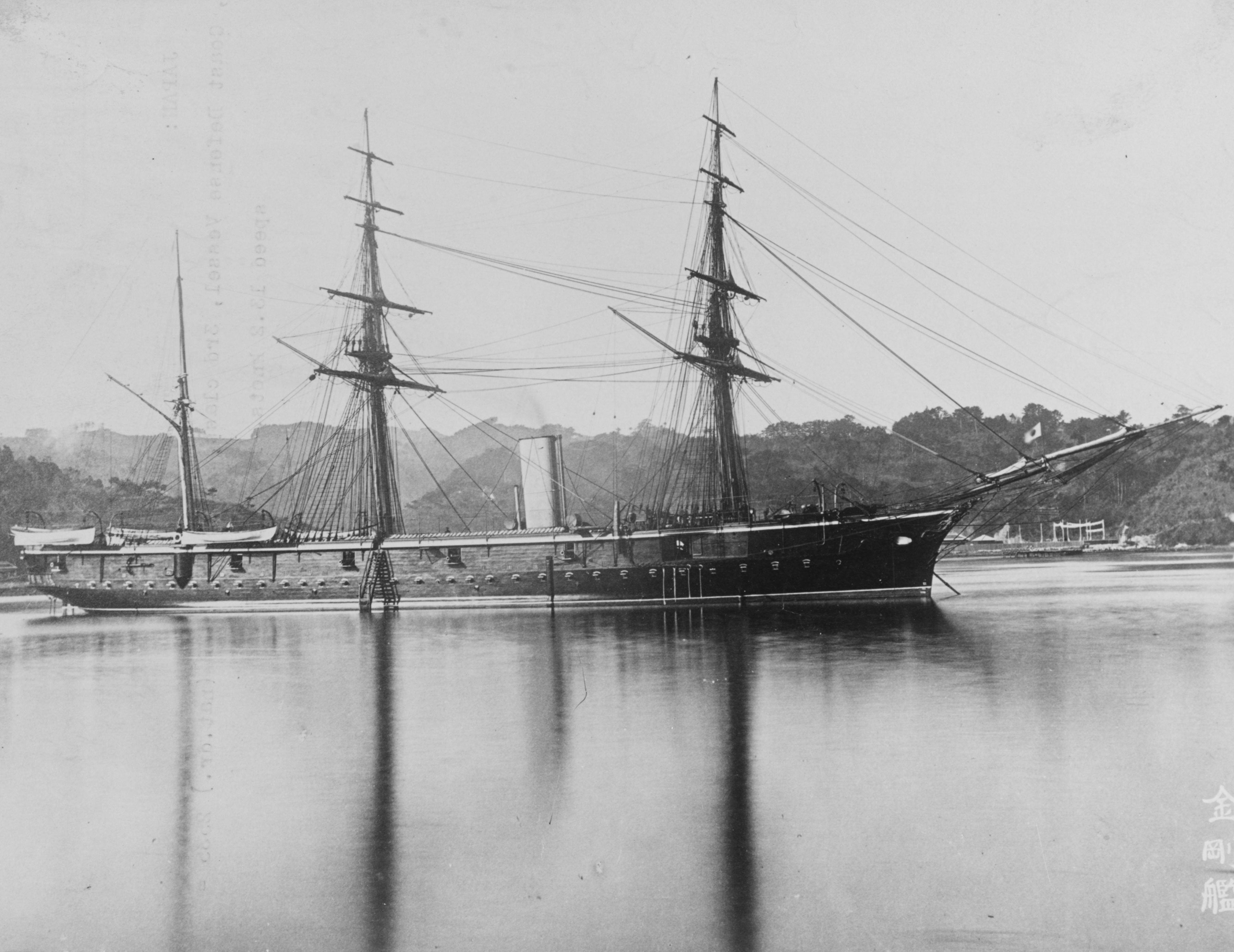
The ironclad corvette Kongō

In 1870 an Imperial decree determined that Britain's Royal Navy should serve as the model for development, instead of the Netherlands navy. In 1873 a thirty-four-man British naval mission, headed by Lt. Comdr. Archibald Douglas, arrived in Japan. Douglas directed instruction at the Naval Academy at Tsukiji for several years, the mission remained in Japan until 1879, substantially advancing the development of the navy and firmly establishing British traditions within the Japanese navy from matters of seamanship to the style of its uniforms and the attitudes of its officers.

From September 1870, the English Lieutenant Horse, a former gunnery instructor for the Saga fief during the Bakumatsu period, was put in charge of gunnery practice on board the Ryūjō. In 1871, the ministry resolved to send 16 trainees abroad for training in naval sciences (14 to Great Britain, two to the United States), among whom was Heihachirō Tōgō. In 1879, Commander L. P. Willan was hired to train naval cadets.

Ships such as the Fusō, Kongō and Hiei were built in British shipyards, and they were the first warships built abroad specifically for the Imperial Japanese Navy. Private construction companies such as Ishikawajima and Kawasaki also emerged around this time.

=== First interventions abroad (Taiwan 1874, Korea 1875–76) ===
During 1873, a plan to invade the Korean Peninsula, the Seikanron proposal made by Saigō Takamori, was narrowly abandoned by decision of the central government in Tokyo. In 1874, the Taiwan expedition was the first foray abroad of the new Imperial Japanese Navy and Army after the Mudan Incident of 1871, however the navy served largely as a transport force.

Various interventions in the Korean Peninsula continued in 1875–1876, starting with the Ganghwa Island incident provoked by the Japanese gunboat Un'yō, leading to the dispatch of a large force of the Imperial Japanese Navy. As a result, the Japan–Korea Treaty of 1876 was signed, marking the official opening of Korea to foreign trade, and Japan's first example of Western-style interventionism and adoption of "unequal treaties" tactics.

In 1878, the Japanese cruiser Seiki sailed to Europe with an entirely Japanese crew.

== Naval expansion (1882–1893) ==
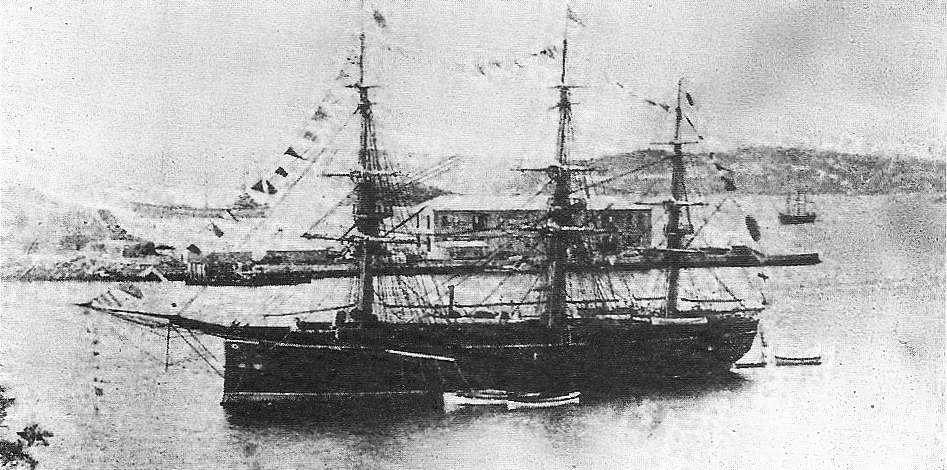
The British-built steam ironclad warship Ryūjō was the flagship of the Imperial Japanese Navy until 1881.

=== First naval expansion bill ===
After the Imo Incident in July 1882, Iwakura Tomomi submitted a document to the daijō-kan titled "Opinions Regarding Naval Expansion" asserting that a strong navy was essential to maintaining the security of Japan. In furthering his argument, Iwakura suggested that domestic rebellions were no longer Japan's primary military concern and that naval affairs should take precedence over army concerns; a strong navy was more important than a sizable army to preserve the Japanese state. Furthermore, he justified that a large, modern navy would have the added potential benefit of instilling Japan with greater international prestige and recognition, as navies were internationally recognized hallmarks of power and status. Iwakura also suggested that the Meiji government could support naval growth by increasing taxes on tobacco, sake, and soy.

After lengthy discussions, Iwakura eventually convinced the ruling coalition to support Japan's first multi-year naval expansion plan in history. In May 1883, the government approved a plan that, when completed, would add 32 warships over eight years at a cost of just over ¥26 million. This development was very significant for the navy, as the amount allocated virtually equaled the navy's entire budget between 1873 and 1882. The 1882 naval expansion plan succeeded in a large part because of Satsuma power, influence, and patronage. Between 19 August and 23 November 1882, Satsuma forces with Iwakura's leadership, worked tirelessly to secure support for the Navy's expansion plan. After uniting the other Satsuma members of the Dajokan, Iwakura approached Emperor Meiji arguing persuasively just as he did with the Dajokan, that naval expansion was critical to Japan's security and that the standing army of forty thousand men was more than sufficient for domestic purposes. While the government should direct the lion's share of future military appropriations toward naval matters, a powerful navy would legitimize an increase in tax revenue. On November 24, the emperor assembled select ministers of the daijō-kan together with military officers, and announced the need for increased tax revenues to provide adequate funding for military expansion, this was followed by an imperial re-script. The following month, in December, an annual ¥7.5-million tax increase on sake, soy, and tobacco was fully approved, in the hopes that it would provide ¥3.5 million annually for warship construction and ¥2.5 million for warship maintenance. In February 1883, the government directed further revenues from other ministries to support an increase in the navy's warship construction and purchasing budget. By March 1883, the navy secured the ¥6.5 million required annually to support an eight-year expansion plan, this was the largest that the Imperial Japanese Navy had secured in its young existence.

However, naval expansion remained a highly contentious issue for both the government and the navy throughout much of the 1880s. Overseas advances in naval technology increased the costs of purchasing large components of a modern fleet, so that by 1885 cost overruns had jeopardized the entire 1883 plan. Furthermore, increased costs coupled with decreased domestic tax revenues, heightened concern and political tension in Japan regarding funding naval expansion. In 1883, two large warships were ordered from British shipyards.

The Naniwa and Takachiho were 3,650-ton ships. They were capable of speeds up to 18 kn (33 km/h; 21 mph) and were armed with 54 to 76 mm (2 to 3 in) deck armor and two 260 mm (10 in) Krupp guns. The naval architect Sasō Sachū designed these on the line of the Elswick class of protected cruisers but with superior specifications. An arms race was taking place with China however, who equipped herself with two 7,335-ton German-built battleships (Ting Yüan and Chen-Yüan). Unable to confront the Chinese fleet with only two modern cruisers, Japan resorted to French assistance to build a large, modern fleet which could prevail in the upcoming conflict.

=== Influence of the French "Jeune École" (1880s) ===
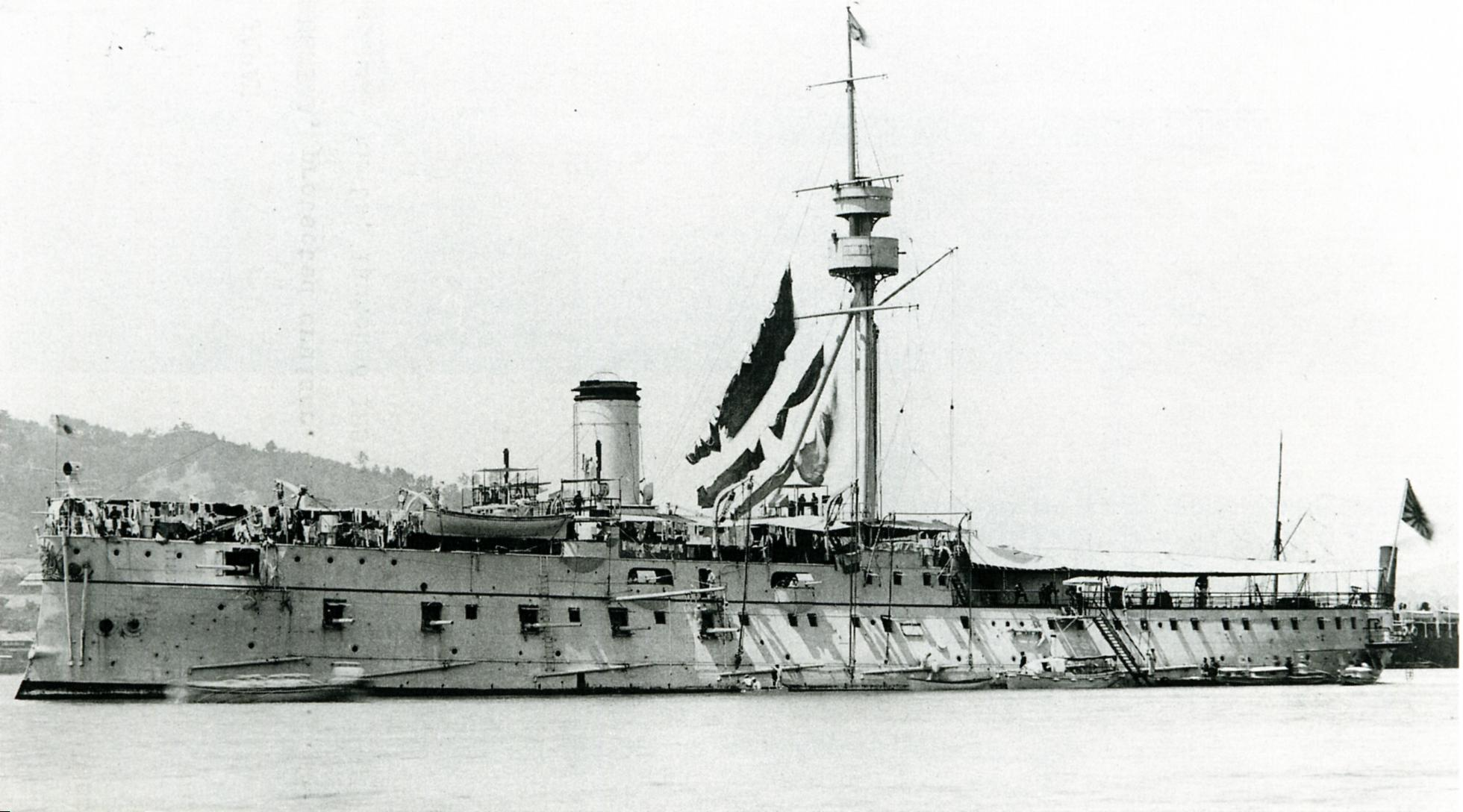
The French-built protected cruiser Matsushima, the flagship of the IJN at the Battle of the Yalu River in 1894

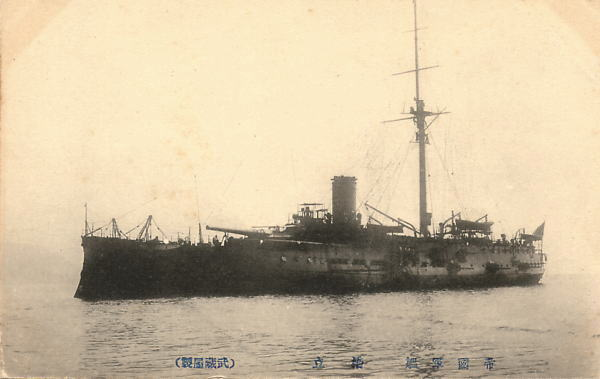
The protected cruiser Hashidate, built domestically at the arsenal of Yokosuka

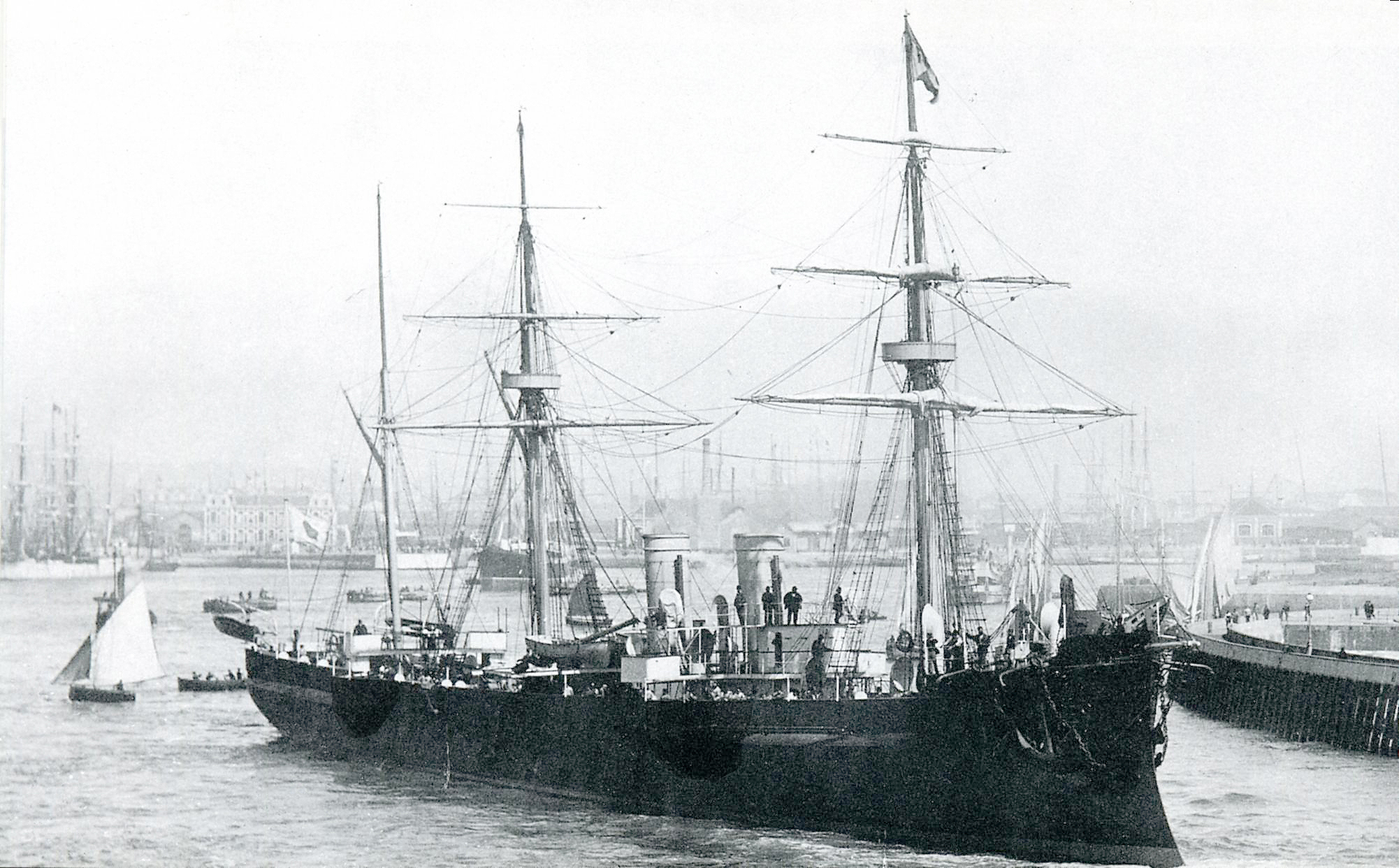
The Unebi, 1886

During the 1880s, France took the lead in influence, due to its "Jeune École" ("young school") doctrine, favoring small, fast warships, especially cruisers and torpedo boats, against bigger units. The choice of France may also have been influenced by the Minister of the Navy, who happened to be Enomoto Takeaki at that time (Navy Minister 1880–1885), a former ally of the French during the Boshin War. Also, Japan was uneasy with being dependent on Great Britain, at a time when Great Britain was very close to China.

The Meiji government issued its First Naval Expansion bill in 1882, requiring the construction of 48 warships, of which 22 were to be torpedo boats. The naval successes of the French Navy against China in the Sino-French War of 1883–85 seemed to validate the potential of torpedo boats, an approach which was also attractive to the limited resources of Japan. In 1885, the new Navy slogan became Kaikoku Nippon (海国日本, "Maritime Japan").

In 1885, the leading French Navy engineer Émile Bertin was hired for four years to reinforce the Japanese Navy and to direct the construction of the arsenals of Kure and Sasebo. He developed the Sankeikan class of cruisers; three units featuring a single powerful main gun, the 320 mm (13 in) Canet gun. Altogether, Bertin supervised the building of more than 20 units. They helped establish the first true modern naval force of Japan. It allowed Japan to achieve mastery in the building of large units, since some of the ships were imported, and some others were built domestically at the arsenal of Yokosuka:

- 3 cruisers: the 4,700-ton Matsushima and Itsukushima, built in France, and the Hashidate, built at Yokosuka.
- 3 coastal warships of 4,278 tons.
- 2 small cruisers: the Chiyoda, a small cruiser of 2,439 tons built in Britain, and the Yaeyama, 1,800 tons, built at Yokosuka.
- 1 frigate, the 1,600-ton Takao, built at Yokosuka.
- 1 aviso: the 726-ton Chishima, built in France.
- 16 torpedo boats of 54 tons each, built in France by the Companie du Creusot in 1888, and assembled in Japan.

This period also allowed Japan "to embrace the revolutionary new technologies embodied in torpedoes, torpedo-boats and mines, of which the French at the time were probably the world's best exponents". Japan acquired its first torpedoes in 1884, and established a "Torpedo Training Center" at Yokosuka in 1886.

These ships, ordered during the fiscal years 1885 and 1886, were the last major orders placed with France. The unexplained sinking of Unebi en route from France to Japan in December 1886, created embarrassment however.

=== British shipbuilding ===
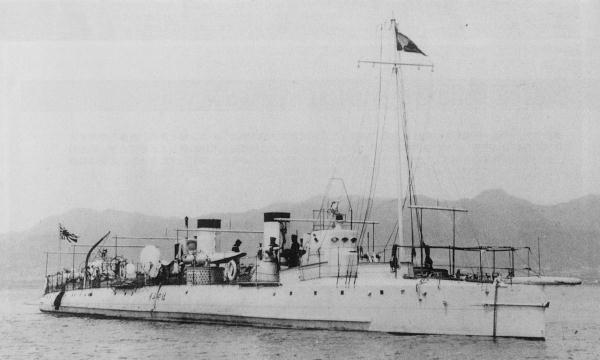
The torpedo boat Hayabusa

Japan turned again to Britain, with the order of a revolutionary torpedo boat, Kotaka, which was considered the first effective design of a destroyer, in 1887 and with the purchase of Yoshino, built at the Armstrong works in Elswick, Newcastle upon Tyne, the fastest cruiser in the world at the time of her launch in 1892. In 1889, she ordered the Clyde-built Chiyoda, which defined the type for armored cruisers.

Between 1882 and 1918, ending with the visit of the French military mission to Japan, the Imperial Japanese Navy stopped relying on foreign instructors altogether. In 1886, she manufactured her own prismatic powder, and in 1892 one of her officers invented a powerful explosive, the Shimose powder.

== First Sino-Japanese War (1894–1895) ==
Japan continued the modernization of its navy, especially driven by Chinese efforts to construct a powerful modern fleet with foreign (especially German) assistance, and as a result tensions began to rise between the two countries over competing interests in Korea. The Japanese naval leadership was generally cautious and even apprehensive at the prospect of hostilities with China, as the navy had not yet received several modern warships that had been ordered in February 1893, particularly the battleships Fuji and Yashima and the cruiser Akashi. Hence, initiating hostilities at this time was perceived as ill-advised, and the navy was far less confident than their counterparts in the Japanese army about the outcome of a war with China.

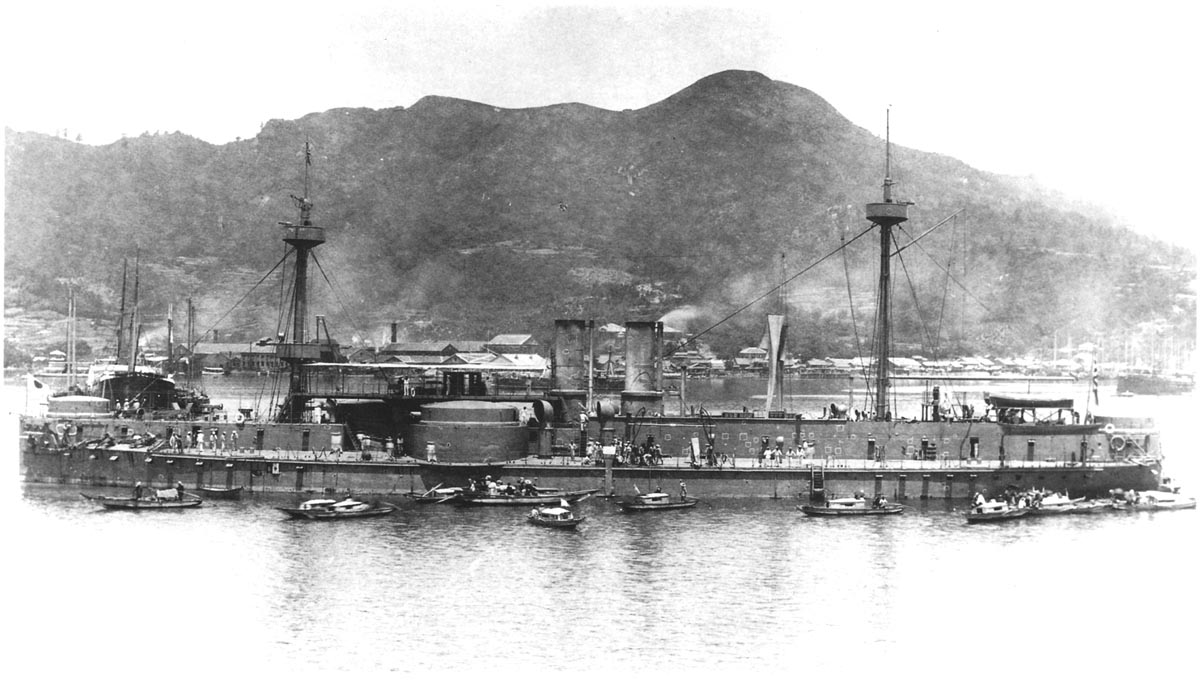
The Chinese ironclad battleship Zhenyuan of the Beiyang Fleet, captured by Japan in 1895

Japan's main strategy was to swiftly obtain naval superiority, as this was critical to the success of operations on land. An early victory over the Beiyang Fleet would allow Japan to transport troops and material to the Korean Peninsula; additionally, the Japanese judged that a protracted war with China would increase the risk of intervention by the European powers with interests in East Asia. The army's Fifth Division would land at Chemulpo on the western coast of Korea, both to engage and push Chinese forces northwest up the peninsula and to draw the Beiyang Fleet into the Yellow Sea, where it would be engaged in decisive battle. Depending upon the outcome of this engagement, Japanese decisionmakers anticipated that they would be faced with one of three choices. If the Combined Fleet were to win decisively at sea, the larger part of the Japanese army could immediately land in force on the Korean coast between Shanhaiguan and Tianjin in order to defeat the Chinese army and bring the war to a swift conclusion. If the naval engagement was a draw, and neither side gained decisive control of the sea, army units in Korea would concentrate on maintaining preexisting positions. Lastly, if the Combined Fleet was defeated and consequently lost command of the sea, the bulk of the army would remain in Japan and prepare to repel a Chinese invasion, while the Fifth Division in Korea would be ordered to dig in and fight a rearguard action.

A Japanese squadron intercepted and defeated a Chinese naval force near the Korean island of Pungdo, damaging a cruiser, sinking a loaded transport, capturing one gunboat and destroying another. This battle occurred before war was officially declared on 1 August 1894. On 10 August, the Japanese ventured into the Yellow Sea to seek out the Beiyang Fleet, and subsequently bombarded both Weihaiwei and Port Arthur. Finding only small vessels in both harbors, the Combined Fleet returned to Korea to support further landings off the Chinese coast. The Beiyang Fleet, under the command of Admiral Ding Ruchang, was initially ordered to remain close to the Chinese coast while reinforcements were sent to Korea by land. However, as Japanese troops swiftly advanced northward from Seoul to Pyongyang, the Chinese decided to rush troops to Korea by sea under a naval escort in mid-September. Concurrently, because there not yet been a decisive encounter at sea, the Japanese decided to send more troops to Korea. Early in September, the Japanese navy was directed to initiate further landings and to support the army on Korea's western coast. As Japanese ground forces moved north to attack Pyongyang, Admiral Itō Sukeyuki correctly guessed that the Chinese would attempt to reinforce their army in Korea by sea. On 14 September, the Combined Fleet sailed north to search the Korean and Chinese coasts and bring the Beiyang Fleet to battle. On 17 September 1894, the Japanese encountered the Beiyang Fleet off the mouth of the Yalu River. The Beiyang Fleet was crippled during the ensuing battle, in which the Chinese lost eight out of 12 warships. The Chinese subsequently withdrew behind the Weihaiwei fortifications. However, they were then surprised by Japanese troops, who had outflanked the harbor's defenses in coordination with the navy. The remnants of the Beiyang Fleet were destroyed at Weihaiwei. Although Japan had emerged victorious at sea, the two large German-made Chinese ironclad battleships (Dingyuan and Zhenyuan) had remained almost impervious to Japanese guns, highlighting the need for bigger capital ships in the Imperial Japanese Navy. The next step of the Imperial Japanese Navy's expansion would thus involve a combination of heavily armed large warships, with smaller and more innovative offensive units permitting aggressive tactics.

As a result of the conflict, under the Treaty of Shimonoseki (17 April 1895), Taiwan and the Pescadores Islands were transferred to Japan. The Imperial Japanese Navy took possession of the island and quelled opposition movements between March and October 1895. Japan also obtained the Liaodong Peninsula, although was later forced by Russia, Germany and France to return it to China (Triple Intervention), only for Russia to take possession of it soon after.

== Suppression of the Boxer rebellion (1900) ==
The Imperial Japanese Navy further intervened in China in 1900 by participating, together with Western Powers, in the suppression of the Chinese Boxer Rebellion. The Japanese navy supplied the largest number of warships (18 out of a total of 50) and delivered the largest contingent of troops among the intervening nations (20,840 Imperial Japanese Army and Navy soldiers, out of a total of 54,000).

The conflict allowed Japan to engage in combat alongside Western nations and to acquire first-hand understanding of their fighting methods.

== Naval buildup and tensions with Russia ==
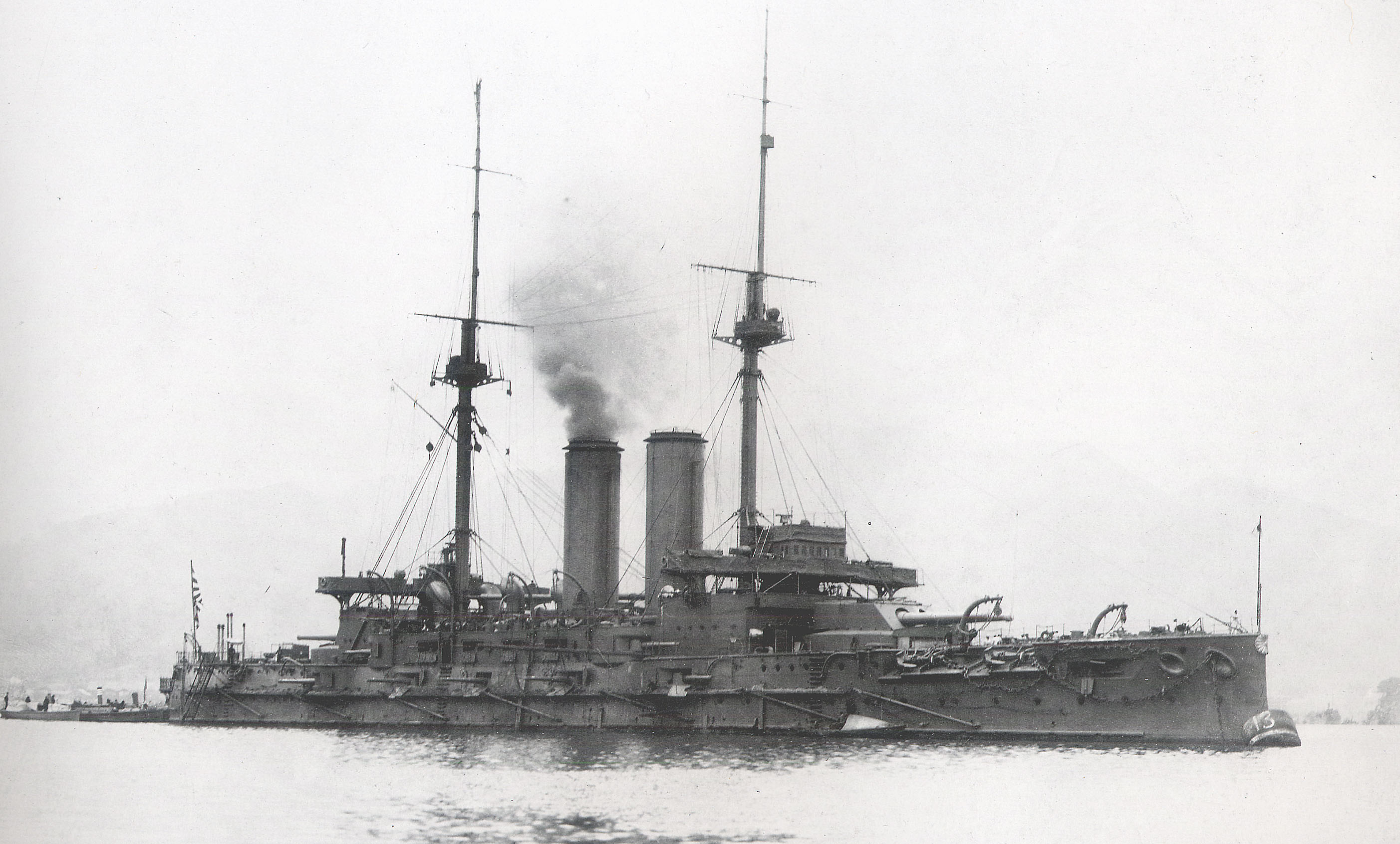
The pre-dreadnought battleship Mikasa, among the most powerful battleships of her time, in 1905, was one of the six battleships ordered as part of the program.

Following the war against China, Japan was pressured into renouncing its claim to the Liaodong Peninsula in the Russian-led Triple Intervention. The Japanese were well aware that they could not compete with the overwhelming naval power possessed by the three countries in East Asian waters, particularly Russia. Faced with little choice, the Japanese ceded the peninsula back to China for an additional 30 million taels (roughly ¥45 million). The cession of the Liaodong Peninsula was seen as a humiliation by the Japanese political and military leadership, and Japan began to build up its military strength in preparation for future confrontations. The political capital and public support that the navy gained as a result of the recent conflict with China also encouraged popular and legislative support for naval expansion.

In 1895, Yamamoto Gombei was assigned to compose a study of Japan's future naval needs. He believed that Japan should have sufficient naval strength to not only deal with a single hypothetical enemy individually, but also to confront any fleet from two combined powers that might be dispatched against Japan from overseas waters. He assumed that given their conflicting global interests, it was highly unlikely that the United Kingdom and Russia would ever join together in a war against Japan, instead considering it more likely that a major power like Russia (in alliance with a lesser naval power) would dispatch a portion of its fleet against Japan. Yamamoto therefore calculated that four battleships would be the most likely strength of any seagoing force that a major power could divert from their other naval commitments to use against Japan, and he also believed that two more battleships might be contributed to such a naval expedition by a lesser hostile power. In order to achieve victory in such an engagement, Yamamoto theorized that Japan should have a force of at least six large battleships, supplemented by four armored cruisers of at least 7,000 tons. The centerpiece of this expansion was to be the acquisition of four new battleships, in addition to two that were already being completed in Britain as part of an earlier construction program. Yamamoto also advocated the construction of a balanced fleet.

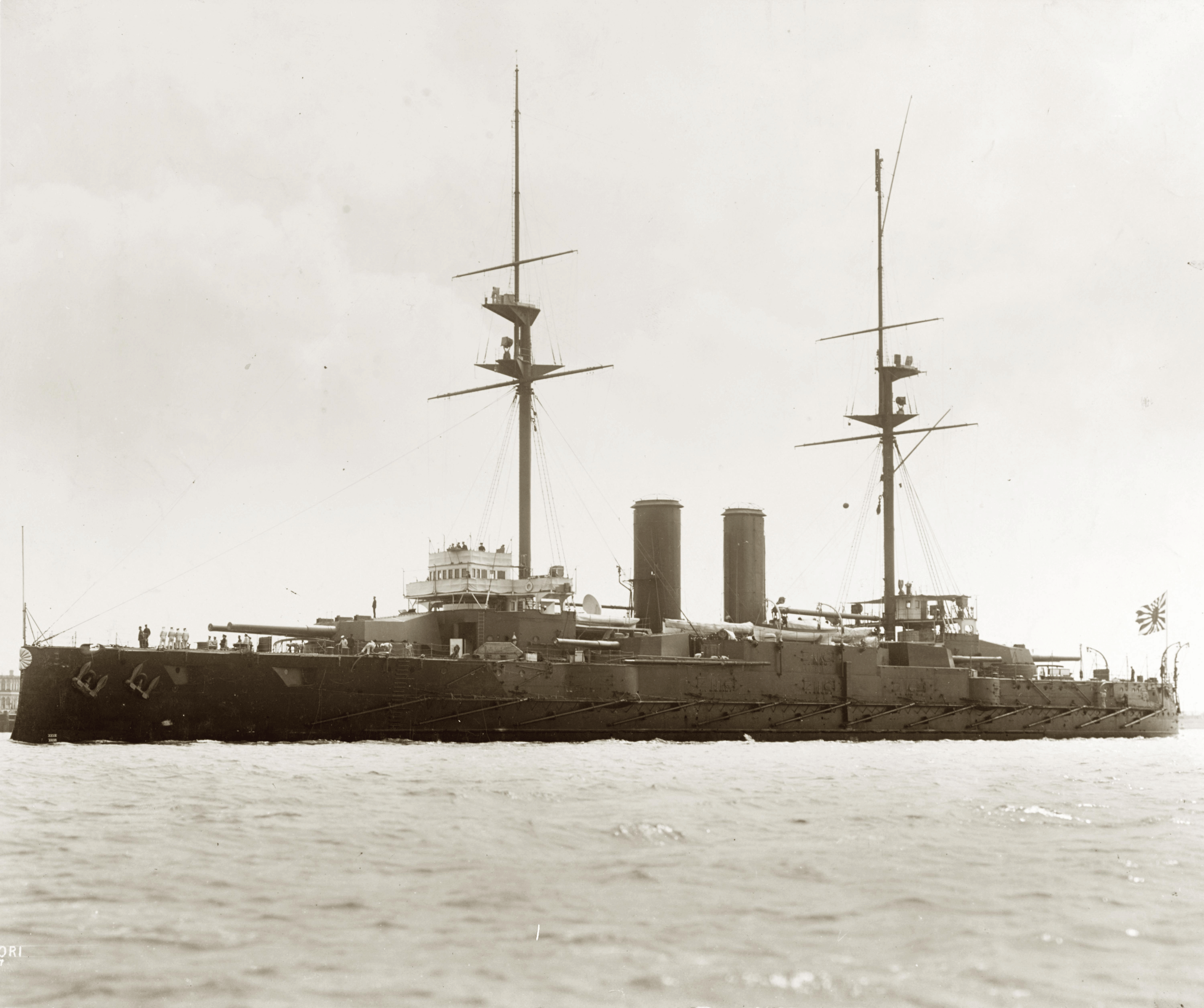
The pre-dreadnought battleship Katori

Under this expansion program, battleships would be supplemented by lesser warships of various types, including cruisers designed to seek out and pursue the enemy, as well as a sufficient number of destroyers and torpedo boats capable of striking the enemy in home ports. As a result, the program also included the construction of twenty-three destroyers, sixty-three torpedo boats, and an expansion of Japanese shipyards and repair and training facilities. In 1897, due to fears that the size of the Russian fleet assigned to East Asian waters could be larger than previously believed, the plan was revised. Although budgetary limitations simply did not permit the construction of another battleship squadron, Japanese planners assessed that the new Harvey and KC armor plates could resist all but the largest AP shells, meaning that armored cruisers could take the place of at least some battleships in the line. With modern armor and lighter but more powerful quick-firing guns, this new cruiser type was theoretically superior to many older battleships still afloat. Subsequently, revisions to the ten-year plan led to the four protected cruisers being replaced by an additional two armored cruisers. As a consequence the Japanese concept of a "Six-Six Fleet" was born, calling for a fleet consisting of six battleships and six armored cruisers.

The program for a 260,000-ton navy, to be completed over a ten-year period in two stages of construction, and with a total cost of ¥280 million, was approved by the cabinet in late 1895 and funded by the Diet in early 1896. Of the total, warship acquisitions accounted for just over ¥200 million. The first stage would begin in 1896 and be completed by 1902, and the second was projected to run from 1897 to 1905. The program was largely financed via indemnities secured from the Chinese after the First Sino-Japanese War. This was used to fund the bulk of the naval expansion, roughly ¥139 million, with public loans and existing government revenue providing the rest of the financing required over the ten years of the program. Japan's industrial resources at the time were inadequate to construct a fleet of armored warships wholly domestically, as the country was still in the process of acquiring the industrial infrastructure necessary for the construction of major naval vessels. Consequently, the overwhelming majority of new Japanese warships at this time were built in British shipyards. With the completion of the fleet, Japan would become the fourth strongest naval power in the world in a single decade. In 1902, Japan formed an alliance with Britain, which stipulated that if Japan went to war in the Far East and that a third power entered the fight against Japan, then Britain would come to the aid of the Japanese. This was intended to act as a check to any third power intervening militarily in any future Japanese war with Russia.

== Russo-Japanese War (1904–1905) ==
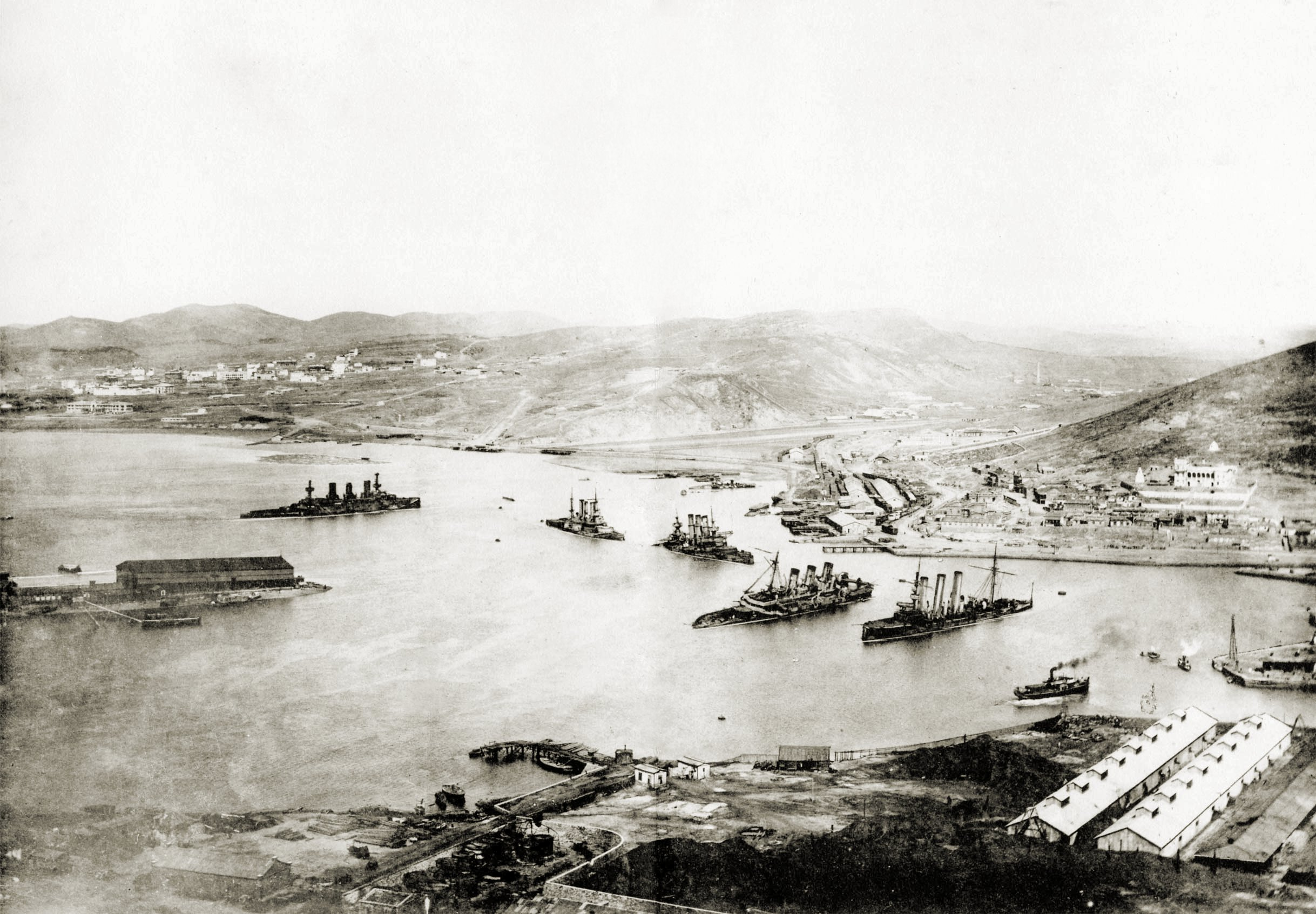
Port Arthur viewed from the Top of Gold Hill, after capitulation in 1905. From left wrecks of Russian pre-dreadnought battleships Peresvet, Poltava, Retvizan, Pobeda and the protected cruiser Pallada

Upon completion, the new fleet consisted of:

- 6 battleships (all British-built)
- 8 armored cruisers (4 British-, 2 Italian-, 1 German-built Yakumo, and 1 French-built Azuma)
- 9 cruisers (5 Japanese-, 2 British- and 2 U.S.-built)
- 24 destroyers (16 British- and 8 Japanese-built)
- 63 torpedo boats (26 German-, 10 British-, 17 French-, and 10 Japanese-built)

One of these battleships, Mikasa, which was among the most powerful warships afloat when completed, was ordered from the Vickers shipyard in the United Kingdom at the end of 1898, for delivery to Japan in 1902. This fleet first saw action with the onset of the Russo-Japanese War. At the Battle of Tsushima, Admiral Togo (flag in Mikasa) led the Japanese Grand Fleet into the decisive engagement of the war. The Russian fleet was almost completely annihilated in a lopsided battle; out of 38 Russian ships, 21 were sunk, seven captured and six disarmed. 4,545 Russian servicemen were killed and 6,106 taken prisoner. Conversely, the Japanese only lost 116 men and three torpedo boats. These victories broke Russian naval strength in East Asia, and triggered waves of mutinies in the Russian Navy at Sevastopol, Vladivostok and Kronstadt, peaking in June with the Potemkin uprising, which contributed to the Russian Revolution of 1905. The victory at Tsushima significantly elevated the stature of the Japanese navy at home and abroad.

The Imperial Japanese Navy acquired its first submarines in 1905 from Electric Boat Company, barely four years after the U.S. Navy had commissioned its own first submarine, USS Holland. The submarines were Holland designs, developed under the supervision of Electric Boat representative Arthur L. Busch. These five submarines (known as Holland Type VII's) were shipped in kit form to Japan (October 1904) and then assembled at the Yokosuka, Kanagawa Yokosuka Naval Arsenal, to become hulls No.1 through No. 5, and became operational at the end of 1905.

== Towards an autonomous national navy (1905–1914) ==
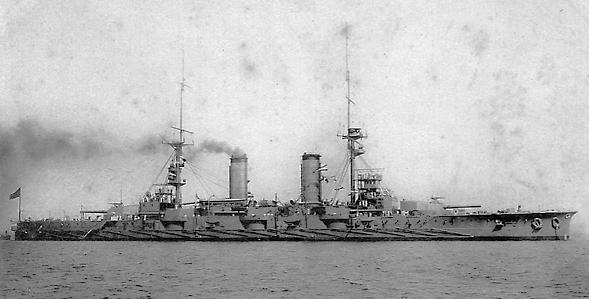
The semi-dreadnought battleship Satsuma, the first ship in the world to be designed and laid down as an "all-big-gun" battleship

Japan continued in its efforts to build up a strong domestic naval industry. Following a strategy of "copy, improve, innovate", foreign ships of various designs were analyzed in depth, their specifications often improved on, and then were purchased in pairs so as to organize comparative testing and improvements. Over the course of years, the import of entire classes of ships was progressively replaced piecemeal by local assembly, and eventually complete domestic production. This process began with smaller vessels, such as torpedo boats and cruisers in the 1880s, and progressed to whole battleships in the early 20th century. The last major Japanese purchase of a foreign-constructed vessel was in 1913, when the battlecruiser Kongō was purchased from the Vickers shipyard. By 1918, there was no aspect of shipbuilding technology where Japanese capabilities fell significantly below the standards of other modern navies.

The period immediately following the Battle of Tsushima also saw the IJN, under the influence of the navalist theorist Satō Tetsutarō, adopt an explicit policy of preparing for conflict against the U.S. Navy. Satō called for a fleet at least 70% as strong as that of the United States. In 1907, the official policy of the Navy became an 'eight-eight fleet', consisting of eight modern battleships and eight battlecruisers. Financial constraints prevented this idea from ever becoming a reality before the outbreak of the Second World War. By 1920, the Imperial Japanese Navy was the world's third largest, and a leader in naval development and innovation. The Japanese Navy was the first to employ wireless telegraphy in combat, at the 1905 Battle of Tsushima.

In 1905, it began building the battleship Satsuma (at the time the largest warship in the world by displacement), the first ship to be designed, ordered and laid down as an "all-big-gun" battleship, about a year prior to the launching of HMS Dreadnought. Due to a lack of material, she was completed with a mixed battery of rifles, launched on 15 November 1906, and finally completed on 25 March 1910. From 1903 to 1910, Japan began to build battleships domestically. The battleship Satsuma was built in Japan with about 80% material imported from Great Britain, with the following battleship class in 1909, the Kawachi class, built with only 20% imported parts.

== World War I (1914–1918) ==
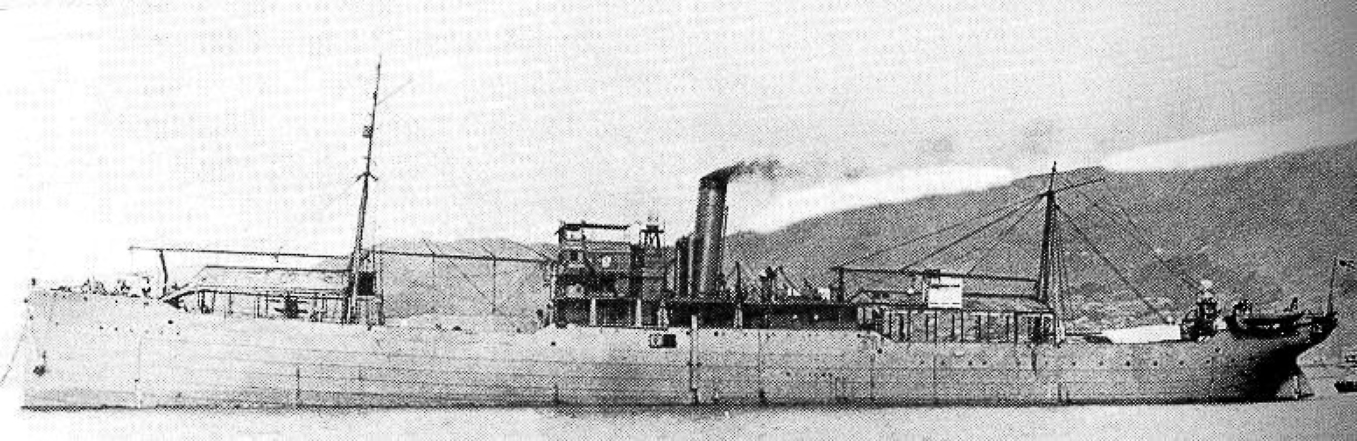
The seaplane carrier Wakamiya conducted the world's first sea-launched air raids in September 1914.

Japan entered World War I on the side of the Entente, against Germany and Austria-Hungary, as a consequence of the 1902 Anglo-Japanese Alliance. At the Siege of Tsingtao, the Imperial Japanese Navy supported the capture of the German colony at Jiaozhou Bay. During the siege, beginning on 5 September 1914, the IJN's Wakamiya carried out the world's first successful sea-launched air strikes. On 6 September 1914, in the very first air-sea battle in history, a Farman aircraft launched by Wakamiya attacked the Austro-Hungarian cruiser Kaiserin Elisabeth and the German gunboat Jaguar off Qingdao. Four Maurice Farman seaplanes bombarded German land targets, including communication and command centers, and damaged a German minelayer in the Tsingtao peninsula from September to 6 November 1914, when the Germans surrendered.

An IJN battle group was also sent to the central Pacific between August and September to pursue the German East Asia Squadron, which then moved into the Southern Atlantic, where it encountered British naval forces and was destroyed near the Falkland Islands. Japan also seized German possessions in northern Micronesia, which remained under Japanese control as colonies until the end of World War II, under the League of Nations' South Seas Mandate. The United Kingdom, hard-pressed in Europe and enjoying only a narrow margin of superiority against the German High Seas Fleet, asked to be loaned Japan's four newly-built Kongō-class battlecruisers (Kongō, Hiei, Haruna, and Kirishima), some of the first ships in the world to be equipped with 356 mm (14 in) guns, and the most formidable battlecruisers in the world at the time. The British request was denied by Japan.

Following a further request for naval assistance by the British, and the initiation of unrestricted submarine warfare by Germany, in March 1917, the Japanese sent a special force to the Mediterranean. This force consisted of one protected cruiser, Akashi, as flotilla leader and eight of the Navy's newest Kaba-class destroyers (Ume, Kusunoki, Kaede, Katsura, Kashiwa, Matsu, Sugi, and Sakaki), under Admiral Satō Kōzō. This formation was based in Malta and efficiently protected Entente shipping between Marseille, Taranto, and ports in Egypt until the end of the war. In June, Akashi was replaced by Izumo, and four more destroyers (Kashi, Hinoki, Momo, and Yanagi) were added to the task force. They were later joined by the cruiser Nisshin. By the end of the war, the Japanese had escorted 788 Entente transports. One destroyer, Sakaki, was torpedoed on 11 June 1917 by a German submarine with the loss of 59 officers and men. A memorial at the Kalkara Naval Cemetery in Malta was dedicated to the 72 Japanese sailors who died in action during the Mediterranean convoy patrols.

Japan also began exporting naval hardware during the First World War. In 1917, Japan exported 12 Arabe-class destroyers to France. In 1918, ships such as Azuma were assigned to act as convoy escorts in the Indian Ocean between Singapore and the Suez Canal as part of Japan's commitments to the U.K. under the Anglo-Japanese alliance. After the conflict, the Japanese Navy received seven German submarines as war reparations. These submarines were brought to Japan and analyzed, contributing greatly to the development of the Japanese submarine industry.

== Interwar years (1918–1937) ==
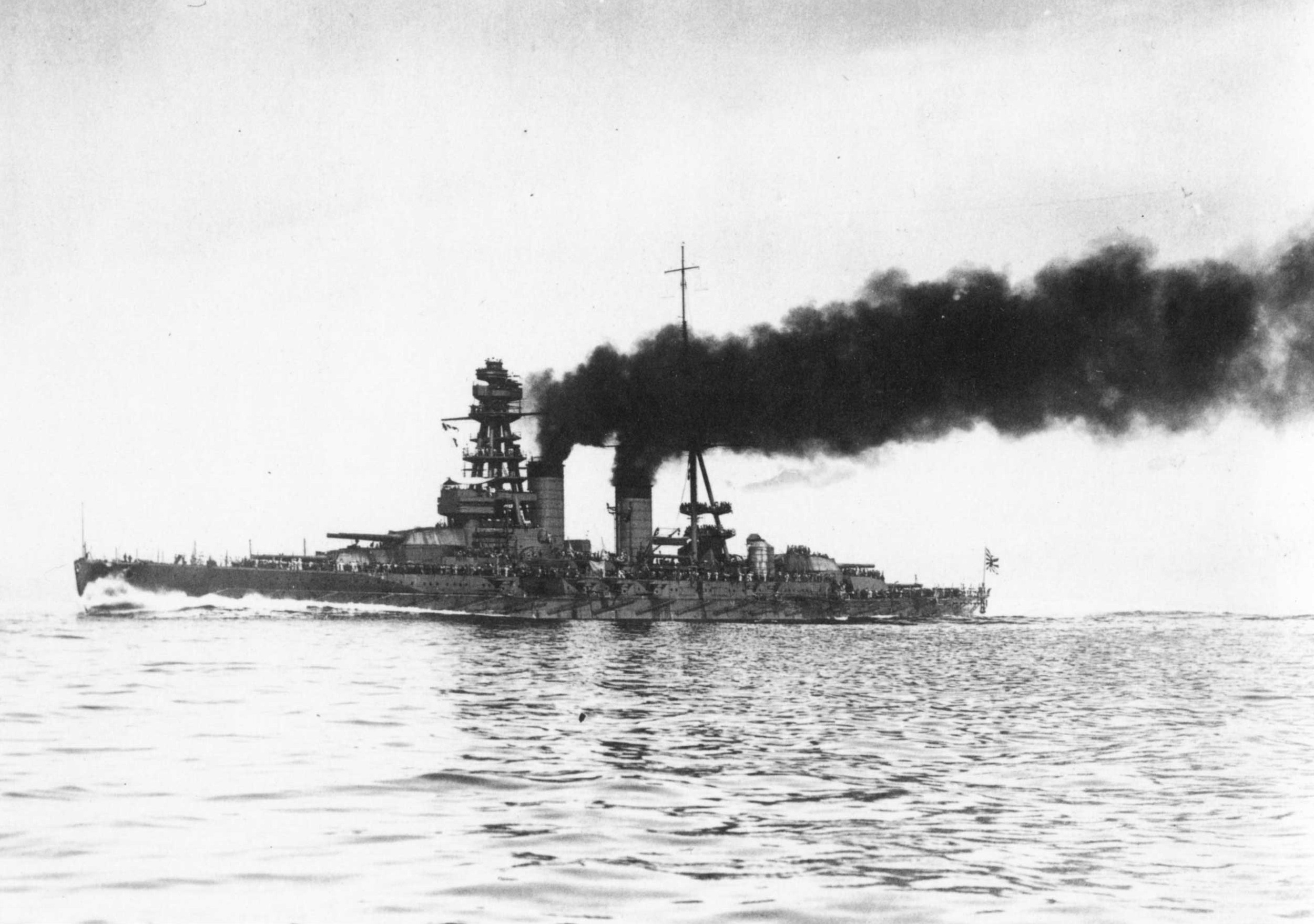
The battleship Nagato in the early 1920s

By 1921, Japan's naval expenditure had reached nearly 32% of the national budget.

=== Washington treaty system ===
In the years following after the end of First World War, the naval construction programs of the world's three greatest naval powers – Britain, Japan and the United States – had threatened to set off a new potentially dangerous and expensive naval arms race. Negotiations between the three powers resulted in the Washington Naval Treaty of 1922, which became one of history's most effective arms reduction programs, setting up a system of ratios between the five signatory powers. The United States and Britain were each allocated 525,000 tons of capital ships, Japan 315,000, and France and Italy 175,000, corresponding to ratios of 5:3:1.75. The treaty's signatories also agreed to a ten-year moratorium on battleship construction, though replacement of battleships reaching 20 years of service was permitted. Maximum displacement limits of 35,000 tons per ship, and a prohibition on arming ships with guns larger than 16 inches, were also set. Aircraft carrier construction was also restricted under the same 5:5:3 ratio, with Japan allotted 81,000 tons.

Naval armament proponents in Japan's delegation were outraged by these limitations, as they limited Japanese naval tonnage well behind that of its foremost rivals at sea. However, the Japanese ultimately concluded that unfavorable tonnage limitations were preferable to an unrestricted arms race with the industrially dominant United States. The Washington System made Japan a junior partner at sea compared to the U.S. and Britain, but it also curtailed the naval construction programs of China and the Soviet Union, who both sought to challenge Japan in Asia.

The Washington Treaty did not restrict the building of ships other than battleships and carriers, resulting in treaty signatories turning toward the construction of heavy cruisers. Treaty stipulations limited these vessels to 10,000 tons and 8-inch guns. The Japanese were also able to extract some concessions, most notably the battleship Mutsu, which had been partly funded by donations from schoolchildren and would have otherwise been scrapped under the terms of the treaty.

Furthermore, the treaty also dictated that the United States, Britain, and Japan could not expand their preexisting Western Pacific fortifications. Japan specifically was barred from militarizing the Kurile Islands, the Bonin Islands, Amami-Oshima, the Loochoo Islands, Formosa and the Pescadores.

=== Development of naval aviation ===
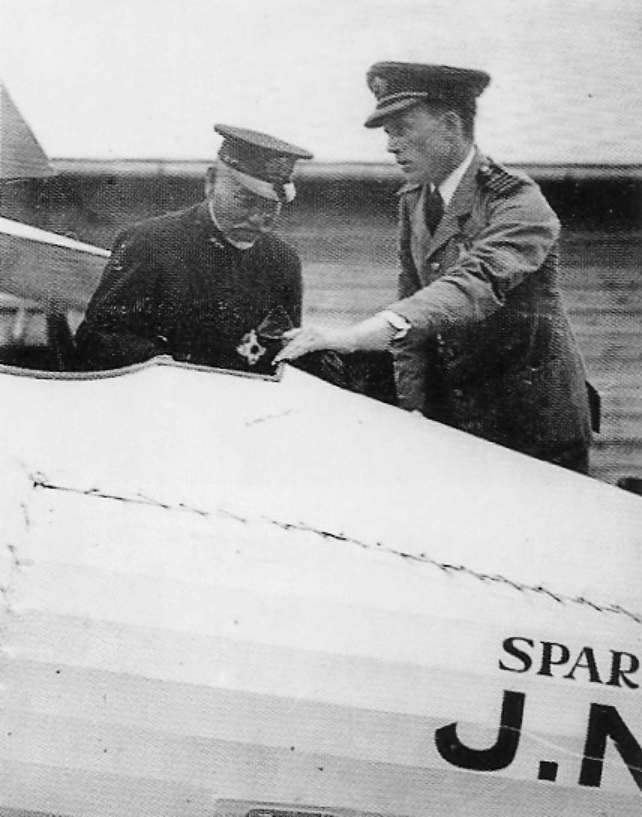
Captain Sempill showing a Sparrowhawk fighter to Admiral Tōgō Heihachirō, 1921

Despite a gradual shift toward domestic production, Japan continued to solicit foreign expertise in areas where the IJN lacked experience, namely naval aviation. The Japanese navy had closely monitored the development and use of combat aviation by the three Allied naval powers during World War I, and concluded that Britain had made the greatest advances in naval aviation. At Japanese request, the British organized the Sempill Mission, led by Captain William Forbes-Sempill (a former officer in the Royal Air Force experienced in the design and testing of Royal Navy aircraft during the First World War), which consisted of 27 members with experience in naval aviation, including pilots and engineers from several British aircraft manufacturing firms. This British technical mission left for Japan in September 1921 with the objective of helping the Imperial Japanese Navy develop and improve the proficiency of its naval air arm. The mission arrived at Kasumigaura Naval Air Station the following month, in November 1921, and stayed in Japan for 18 months.

The mission brought well over a hundred British aircraft comprising twenty different models to Kasumigaura, five of which were then currently in service with the Royal Navy's Fleet Air Arm. Japanese pilots were trained on several of these aircraft, such as the Gloster Sparrowhawk, then a frontline fighter. The Japanese would go on to order 50 of these planes from Gloster, and build 40 domestic variants themselves. These planes eventually provided design inspiration for a number of Japanese naval aircraft. Over the course of the Sempill mission's stay, Japanese technicians became familiar with the newest aerial weapons and equipment, including torpedoes, bombs, machine guns, cameras, and communications gear.

The mission also brought the plans of the most recent British aircraft carriers, such as HMS Argus and HMS Hermes, which influenced the final stages of the development of the Japanese carrier Hōshō. By the time the mission's last members had returned to Britain, the Japanese had acquired a reasonable grasp of the latest aviation technology and taken the first steps toward building an effective naval air force. However, in both technology and doctrine, Japanese naval aviation continued to be dependent on the British model for most of the 1920s.

=== Naval developments during the interwar years ===
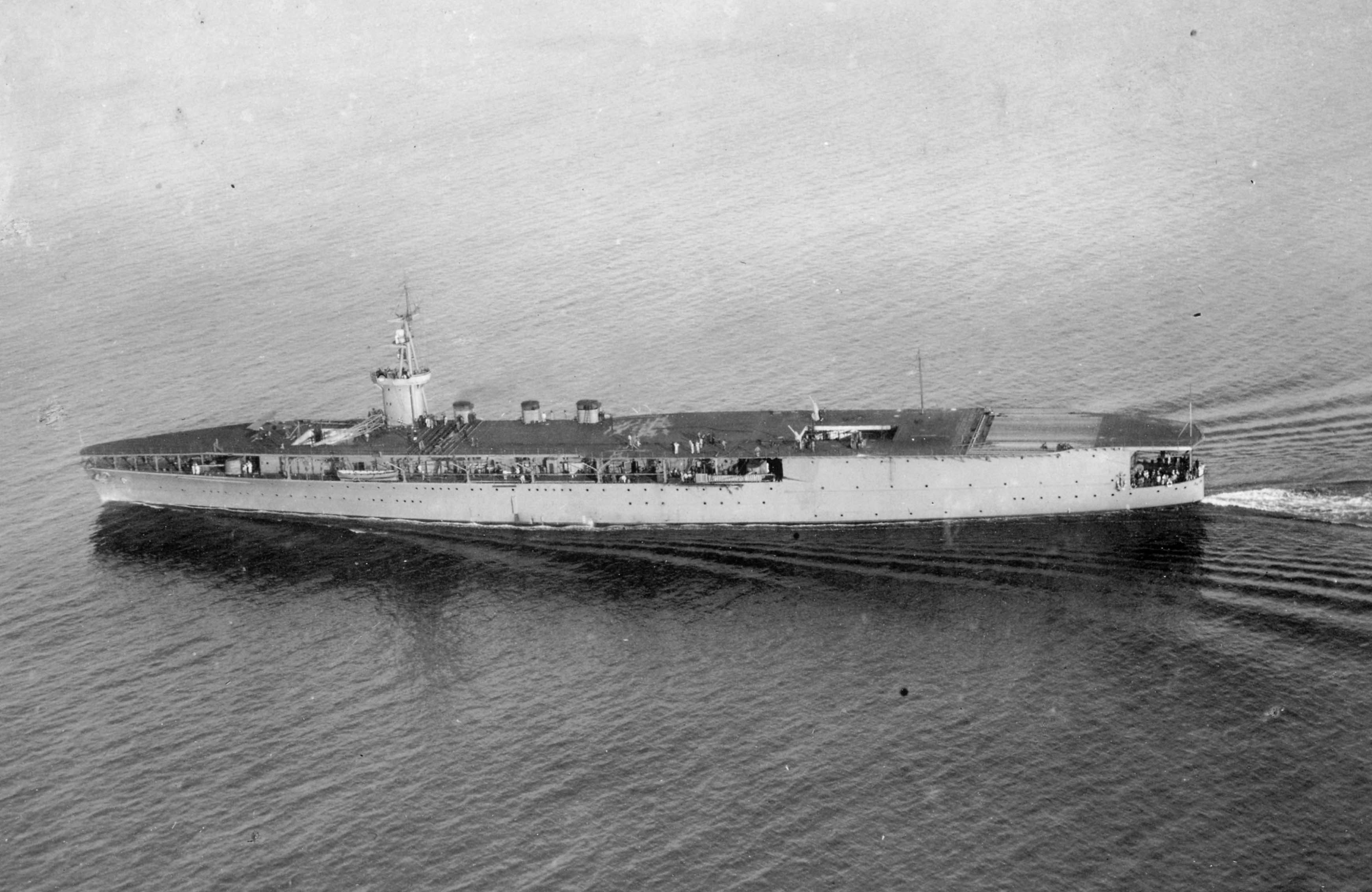
Hōshō, the world's first purpose built aircraft carrier, completed in 1922

Between the First and Second World Wars, Japan took the lead in many areas of warship development:

- In 1921, it launched Hōshō, the first purpose-built aircraft carrier in the world to be completed, and subsequently developed a fleet of carriers that would be one of the most powerful in the world by the early 1940s.
- In keeping with its doctrine, the Imperial Japanese Navy was the first to mount 356 mm (14 in) guns on Kongō and 410 mm (16.1 in) guns on Nagato, and constructed the only battleships ever to mount 460 mm (18.1 in) guns (the Yamato class).
- In 1928, it launched the innovative Fubuki-class destroyer, introducing enclosed dual 127 mm (5 in) turrets capable of anti-aircraft fire. The new destroyer design was soon emulated by other navies. The Fubuki class also featured the first torpedo tubes enclosed in splinter proof turrets.
- Japan developed the 610 mm (24 in) oxygen-fueled Type 93 torpedo, generally recognized as the best torpedo of World War Two.

=== Doctrinal debates ===
The Imperial Japanese Navy was faced before and during World War II with considerable strategic challenges, probably more so than any other navy in the world. Japan, like Britain, was almost entirely dependent on foreign resources to supply its economy. In order to achieve Japan's expansionist policies, the IJN therefore had to secure distant sources of raw material (especially Southeast Asian oil and raw materials), controlled by foreign countries (Britain, France, and the Netherlands), and secure their seaborne transport back to the Home Islands. Japanese planners assessed that building large warships capable of long-range operations was the best way to achieve these goals. In the years before World War II, the IJN began to structure itself specifically to challenge American naval power in the Pacific. Throughout the 1930s, Japanese politics became increasingly dominated by militaristic leaders who prioritized territorial expansion, and who eventually came to view the United States as Japan's main obstacle to achieving this goal.

Japanese naval planners subscribed to a doctrine of "decisive battle" (艦隊決戦, Kantai Kessen), which stipulated that Japan's path to victory against a peer adversary at sea required the IJN to comprehensively destroy the bulk of an enemy's naval strength in a single, large-scale fleet action. Kantai kessen evolved from the writings of geopolitical theorist Alfred T. Mahan, which hypothesized that wars would be decided by large, decisive engagements at sea between opposing surface fleets. Derived from the writings of Satō (who was doubtless influenced by Mahan), Kantai Kessen was the basis of Japan's demand for a 70% ratio (10:10:7) at the Washington Naval Conference, which Japanese naval planners believed would give the IJN superiority in the "decisive battle area", and the U.S.'s insistence on a 60% ratio, which meant parity between the two navies. In the specific case of a hypothetical war with the United States, this "decisive battle" doctrine required the U.S. Navy to sail in force across the Pacific, during which it would be harassed and degraded by Japanese submarines, and then engaged and destroyed by IJN surface units in a "decisive battle area" somewhere in waters close to Japan.

Japan's numerical and industrial inferiority to rivals such as the United States led the Japanese leadership to pursue technical superiority (fewer, but faster, more powerful ships), qualitative superiority (better training), and aggressive tactics (daring and speedy attacks overwhelming the enemy, a recipe for success in previous conflicts). However, these calculations failed to account for the type of war Japan would be fighting against an enemy like the U.S. Japan's opponents in any future Pacific War would not face the political and geographical constraints that adversaries in previous wars did, and Japanese strategic planning did not properly account for serious potential losses in ships and crews.

During the interwar years, two schools of thought emerged over whether the IJN should be organized around powerful battleships, ultimately able to defeat equivalent American ships in Japanese waters, or whether the IJN should prioritize naval airpower and structure its planning around aircraft carriers. Neither doctrine prevailed, resulting in a balanced yet indecisive approach to capital ship development.

A consistent weakness of Japanese warship development was the tendency to incorporate excessive firepower and engine output relative to ship size, which was a side-effect of the Washington Treaty limitations on overall tonnage. This led to shortcomings in stability, protection, and structural strength.

=== Circle Plans ===
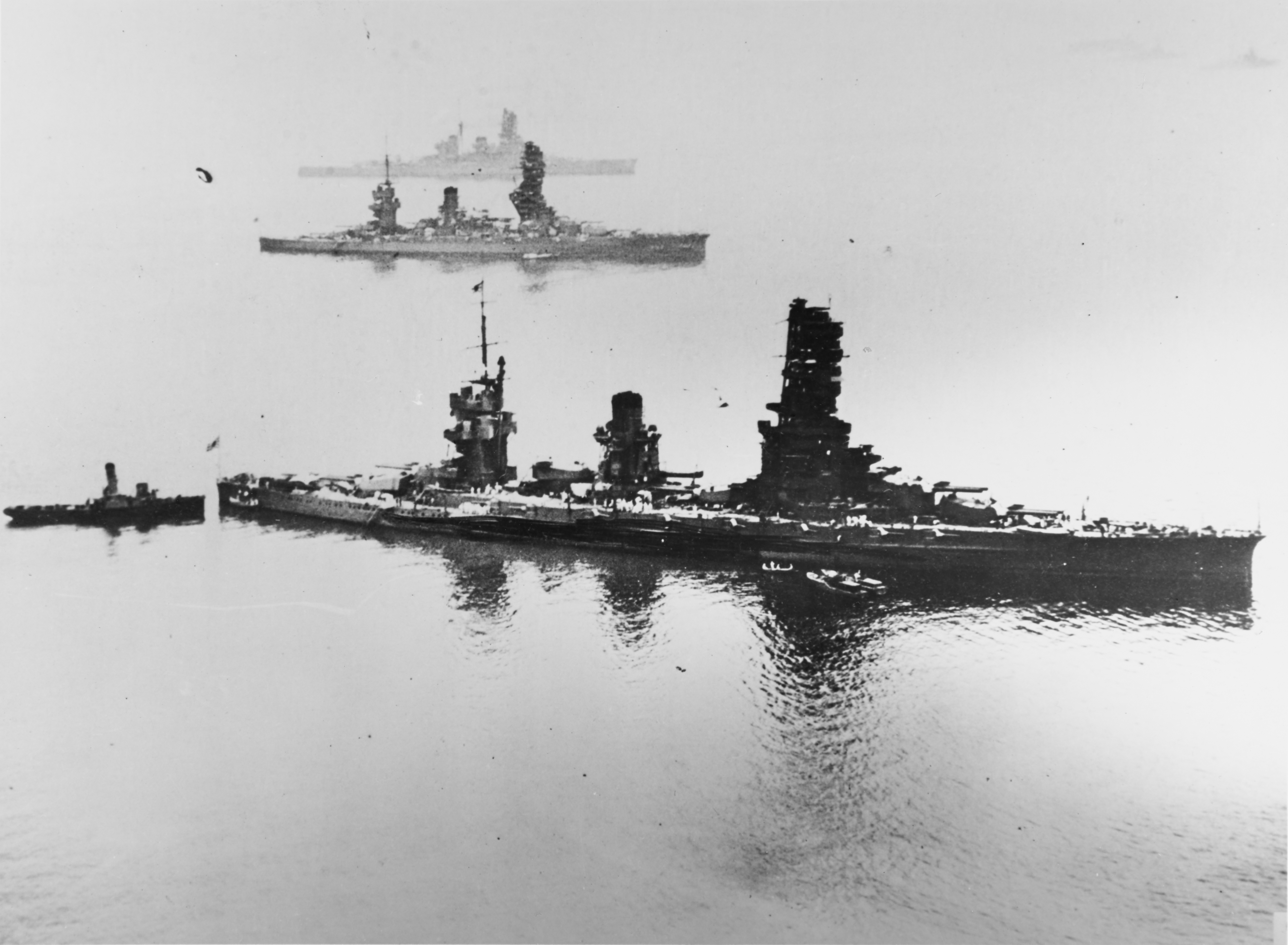
The battleships Yamashiro and Fusō and the battlecruiser Haruna, Tokyo Bay, 1930s

In response to the London Treaty of 1930, the Japanese initiated a series of naval construction programs or hoju keikaku (naval replenishment, or construction, plans), known unofficially as the maru keikaku (circle plans). Between 1930 and the outbreak of the Second World War, four of these "Circle plans" which were drawn up: in 1931, 1934, 1937 and 1939. The Circle One was plan approved in 1931, provided for the construction of 39 ships to be laid down between 1931 and 1934, centering on four of the new Mogami-class cruisers, and the expansion of the Naval Air Service to fourteen air groups. However, plans for a second Circle plan were delayed by the capsizing of the Tomozuru and heavy typhoon damage to the Fourth Fleet, which revealed that the fundamental design philosophy of many Japanese warships was flawed. These flaws included poor construction techniques and structural instability caused by mounting too much weaponry on too small of a displacement hull. As a result, most of the naval budget in 1932–1933 was absorbed by modifications that attempted to rectify these issues with existing equipment.

In 1934, the Circle Two plan was approved, covering the construction of 48 new warships, including the Tone-class cruisers and two aircraft carriers, the Sōryū and Hiryū. The plan also continued the buildup in naval aircraft and authorized the creation of eight new Naval Air Groups. With Japan's renunciation of previously signed naval treaties in December 1934, the Circle Three plan was approved in 1937, marking Japan's third major naval building program since 1930. Circle Three called for the construction of new warships that were free from the restrictions of previous naval treaties over a period of six years. New ships would concentrate on qualitative superiority in order to compensate for Japan's quantitative deficiencies compared to the United States. While the primary focus of Circle Three was to be the construction of two super-battleships, Yamato and Musashi, it also called for building the two Shōkaku-class aircraft carriers, along with sixty-four other warships of other categories. Circle Three also called for the rearming of the decommissioned battlecruiser Hiei and the refitting of her sister ships Kongō, Haruna, and Kirishima. Also funded was the upgrading of four Mogami-class cruisers and two Tone-class cruisers, which were under construction, by replacing their 6-inch main batteries with 8-inch guns. In aviation, Circle Three aimed at maintaining parity with American naval air power by constructing an additional 827 planes, to be allocated between fourteen planned land-based air groups, and increasing carrier aircraft by nearly 1,000. To accommodate the new land aircraft, the plan called for several new airfields to be built or expanded; it also provided for a significant increase in the size of the navy's production facilities for aircraft and aerial weapons.

In 1938, with Circle Three under way, the Japanese began to consider preparations for a fourth naval expansion project, which was scheduled for 1940. With the American Naval Act of 1938, the Japanese accelerated the Circle Four six-year expansion program, which was approved in September 1939. Circle Four's goal was doubling Japan's naval air strength in just five years, delivering air superiority in East Asia and the western Pacific. It called for the building of two Yamato-class battleships, a fleet carrier, six of a new class of planned escort carriers, six cruisers, twenty-two destroyers, and twenty-five submarines.

=== Second Sino-Japanese War ===
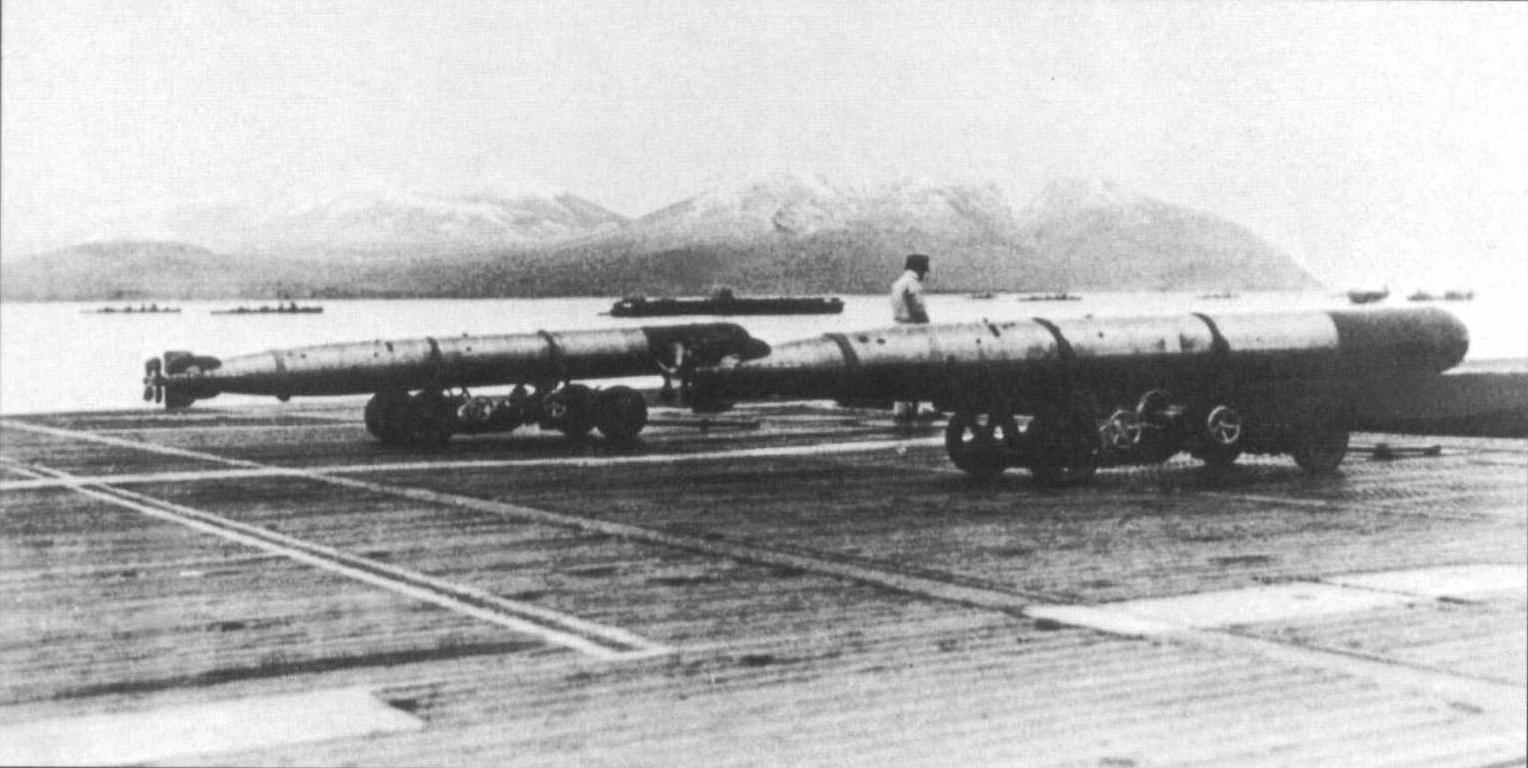
Type 91 Aerial Torpedo aboard the aircraft carrier Akagi

Experience gained during the first part of the Second Sino-Japanese War was of great value to the development of Japanese naval aviation, demonstrating how aircraft could contribute to the projection of naval power ashore.

The IJN had two primary responsibilities during the campaign: to support amphibious operations on the Chinese coast, and to conduct strategic aerial bombardment of Chinese cities. This was the first time any naval air arm had been given such tasks.

From the onset of hostilities in 1937, until Japanese naval forces were diverted to combat in other parts of the Pacific in 1941, naval aircraft played a key role in military operations in mainland China. These began with air attacks on Chinese military installations, largely in the Yangtze River basin along the Chinese coast, by Japanese carrier aircraft. Naval involvement during the conflict peaked in 1938–39 with the heavy bombardment of Chinese cities deep in the interior by land-based medium bombers, and concluded during 1941 with a large-scale attempt by both carrier-borne and land-based tactical aircraft to interdict communication and transportation routes in southern China. Although the 1937–41 air offensives failed in their political and psychological aims, they did reduce the flow of strategic materiel to China, and for a time improved Japan's military situation in the central and southern parts of the country.

== World War II ==
IJN vs USN shipbuilding (1937–1945, in Standard Tons Displacement)
Year	IJN	USN
1937	45,000	75,000
1938	40,000	80,000
1939	35,000	70,000
1940	50,000	50,000
1941	180,000	130,000
1942–45	550,000	3,200,000

To effectively combat the numerically superior U.S. Navy, the Japanese had devoted a large amount of resources to create a force of superior quality. Crucially, relying heavily on the use of aggressive tactics which stemmed from Mahanian doctrine and the concept of decisive battle, Japan did not invest significantly in capabilities needed to protect its long shipping lines against enemy submarines. In particular, Japan under-invested in the vital area of antisubmarine warfare (both escort ships and escort carriers), and in the specialized training and organization to support it. Japan's reluctance to use its submarine fleet for commerce raiding and failure to comprehensively secure its seaborne communications would ultimately contribute to its defeat in the Pacific war. The Japanese Navy also under-invested in intelligence and had hardly any agents active in the United States when the war started. After the war, several Japanese naval officers credited a lack of information about the U.S. Navy as another major factor in their defeat.

On 7 December 1941, the IJN launched a surprise attack on Pearl Harbor, killing 2,403 Americans and crippling the U.S. Pacific Fleet. During the first six months of the Pacific War, the IJN enjoyed spectacular success, inflicting crushing defeats on Allied forces across a vast swathe of the Pacific Ocean. Allied naval strength in Southeast Asia was largely crippled during the initial Japanese conquest. Japanese naval aircraft were responsible for the sinking of HMS Prince of Wales and HMS Repulse, which was the first time that capital ships were sunk by aerial attack while underway. In April 1942, the Indian Ocean raid largely drove the Royal Navy out of Southeast Asian waters.

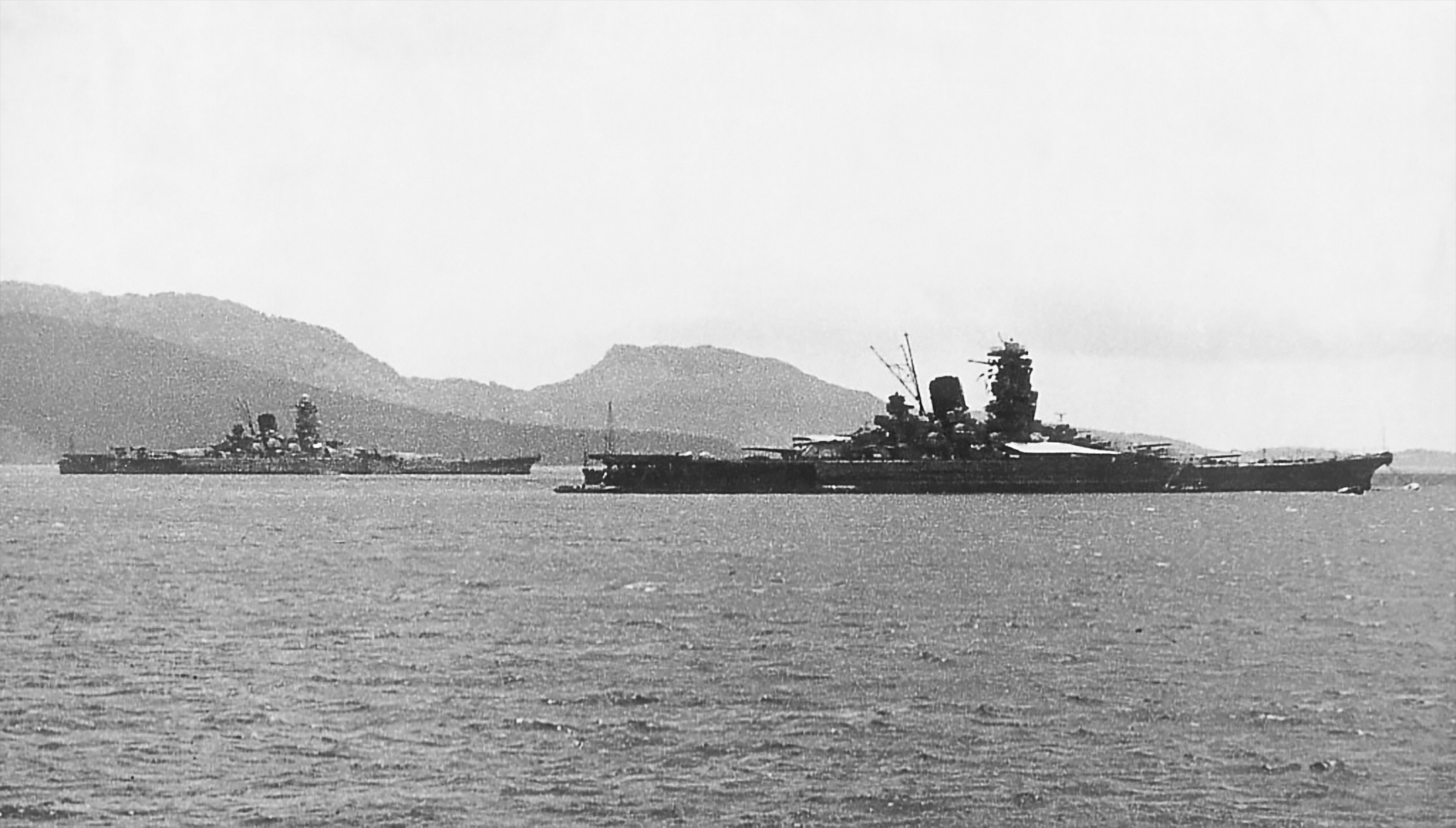
The Yamato-class battleships Yamato and Musashi moored in Truk Lagoon, in 1943

After these successes, the IJN concentrated on the elimination or neutralization of strategic points from which the Allies could launch counteroffensives against territory newly occupied by Japan. However, at the Battle of the Coral Sea the Japanese were forced to abandon their attempts to isolate Australia, while defeat in the Battle of Midway cost the Japanese four fleet carriers and most of their accompanying aircrew. The campaign in the Solomon Islands from August 1942 to February 1943, in which the Japanese ultimately lost a costly, monthslong battle of attrition with Allied forces over the island of Guadalcanal, compounded previous defeats and highlighted the accelerating degradation of the IJN's capabilities. During 1943, American industrial strength began to turn the tide of the war at sea. American forces ultimately managed to gain the upper hand through a vastly greater industrial output, a modernization of their air and naval forces and the inability of Japan to replace lost air and naval power.

In 1943, the Japanese also turned their attention to the defensive perimeters of their previous conquests. Forces on Japanese held islands in Micronesia were to absorb and wear down an expected American counteroffensive. However, American industrial power become apparent and the military forces that faced the Japanese in 1943 were overwhelming in firepower and equipment. From the end of 1943 to 1944 Japan's defensive perimeter failed to hold.

The catastrophic defeat in the Battle of the Philippine Sea in June 1944 was a disaster for Japanese naval air power, with the bulk of the IJN's highly-trained and, at this point in the war, largely irreplaceable carrier pilots shot down. The engagement was a setback from which the IJN's carrier air arm would never recover; American pilots termed the lopsided naval air battle the Great Marianas Turkey Shoot. Four months later, in October 1944, Japanese attempts to interdict American amphibious landings on the Philippine islands at Leyte Gulf, utilizing surface vessels without sufficient air cover, resulted in the destruction of a large part of the Japanese surface fleet. During the last phase of the war, the Imperial Japanese Navy resorted to a series of desperate measures, including a utilization of Special Attack Units, popularly called kamikazes. By May 1945, much of the Imperial Japanese Navy had been sunk, and surviving IJN warships had taken refuge in harbors on the Home Islands, due to both a lack of fuel and an inability to contend with overwhelming American naval airpower. In late July 1945, most of the remaining large warships of the Imperial Japanese Navy were sunk at anchor in air attacks on Kure and the Inland Sea. By August 1945, Nagato was the only surviving capital ship of the Imperial Japanese Navy.

Naval Infantry units from 12th Air Fleet saw extensive action during South Sakhalin and Kuril Islands campaign in Soviet–Japanese War.

== Legacy ==
=== Self-Defense Forces ===
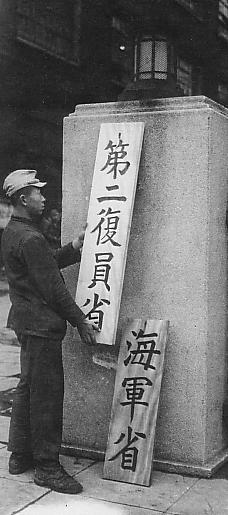
The substitution of Navy Ministry with the Second Demobilization Ministry in December 1945, marking the end of 84-year-history of Japanese Navy

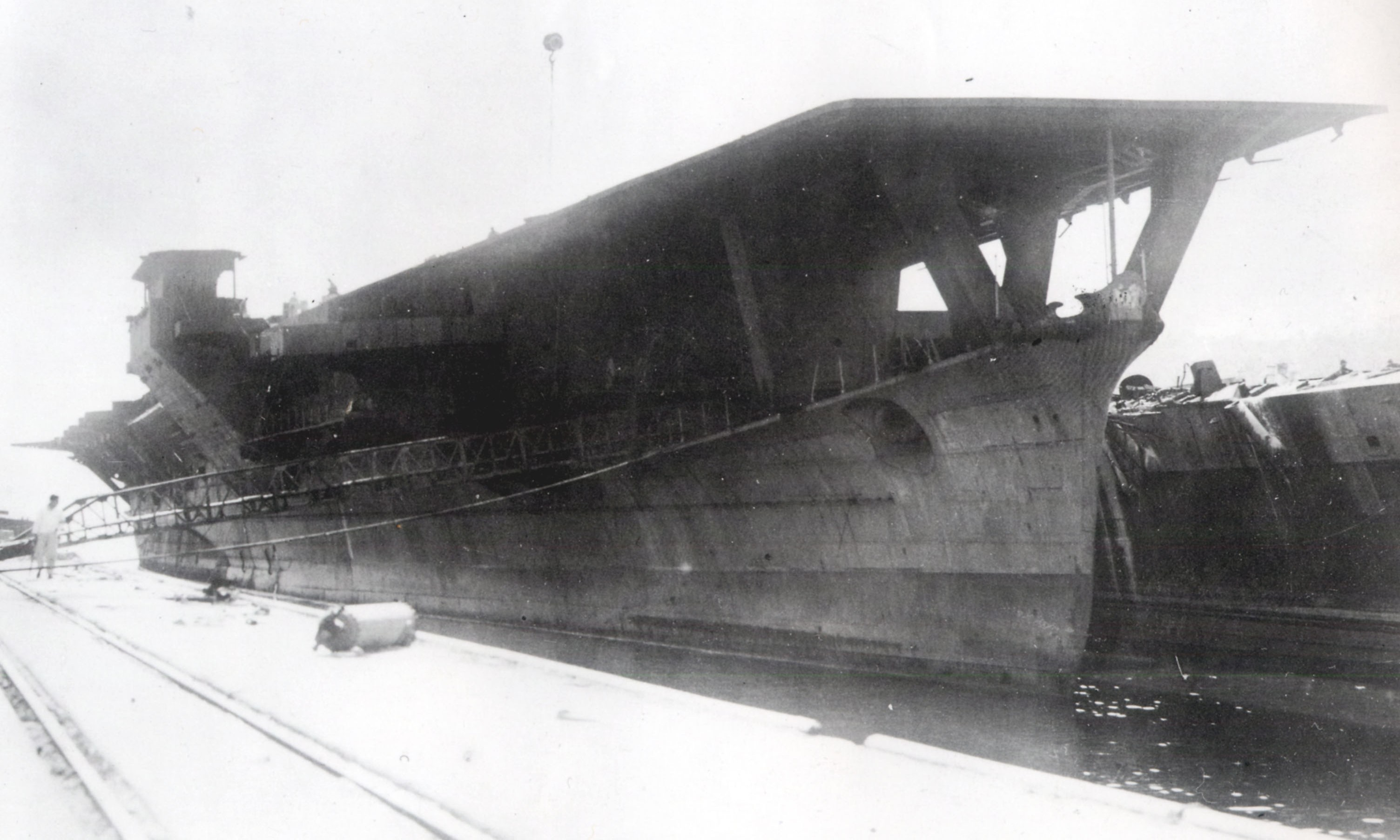
The aircraft carrier Ibuki being dismantled at Sasebo Naval Arsenal, October 1946

Following Japan's surrender and subsequent occupation by the Allies at the conclusion of World War II, the Imperial Japanese Navy, along with the rest of the Japanese military, was dissolved in 1945. In the new constitution of Japan, drawn up in 1947, Article 9 specifies that "the Japanese people forever renounce war as a sovereign right of the nation and the threat or use of force as a means of settling international disputes." The prevalent view in Japan is that this article allows for military forces to be kept for purposes of self-defense.

In 1952, the Safety Security Force was formed within the Maritime Safety Agency, incorporating the minesweeping fleet and other military vessels, mainly destroyers, given by the United States. In 1954, the Safety Security Force was separated, and the JMSDF was formally created as the naval branch of the Japanese Self-Defense Force (JSDF), following the passage of the 1954 Self-Defense Forces Law. Japan's current navy falls under the umbrella of the Japan Self-Defense Forces (JSDF) as the Japan Maritime Self-Defense Force (JMSDF).

== See also ==
- Admiral of the Fleet (Japan)
- Carrier Striking Task Force
- Control Faction and Imperial Way Faction – Army political groups about government reform
- Fleet Faction and Treaty Faction – Navy political groups about naval treaties
- Imperial Japanese Naval Academy
- Imperial Japanese Navy Armor Units
- Imperial Japanese Navy Aviation Bureau
- Imperial Japanese Navy bases and facilities
- Imperial Rescript to Soldiers and Sailors
- Japanese Special Naval Landing Forces
- List of Japanese Navy ships and war vessels in World War II
- List of weapons of the Imperial Japanese Navy
- May 15 Incident – coup d'état with Navy support
- Recruitment in the Imperial Japanese Navy
- "Strike South" and "Strike North" Doctrines
- Tokkeitai – Navy Military Police
