= Imperial Japanese Navy bases and facilities =

This is a list of Imperial Japanese Navy bases and facilities through the surrender of Japan ending World War II.

== Bases ==
- Atsugi Naval Air Base - now Naval Air Facility Atsugi operated by the Japan Maritime Self-Defense Force (JMSDF) and the US Navy
- Kure Naval Base - now a Japan Self-Defense Forces facility and museum
- Maizuru Naval Base
  - Maizuru Naval District - now a Japan Self-Defense Forces facility and museum
- Hiroshima Naval Base
- Oroku Aerodrome/Oroku Naval Air Base - now the Naha Airport/Naha Air Base (JSADF, but the MSDF also has a presence)
- Kōchi Airfield - now Kōchi Ryōma Airport
- Truk Islands naval base
- Tokushima naval base with seaplane base opened in 1941

== Dockyards ==
- Yokosuka Dockyards - now US Navy Yokosuka Ship Repair Facility and United States Fleet Activities Yokosuka
- Ishikawajima Naval Yard (Sumida River) - now IHI Corporation shipyard
- Kure Naval Dockyards - now Universal Shipbuilding Corporation shipyard owned by JFE Holdings and Hitachi Zosen Corporation
- Sasebo Naval Dockyards
- Maizuru Naval Dockyards

== Colleges and Training Facilities ==
- Nagasaki Training Station
- Tsukiji Naval College, Yedo
- Tsukiji Naval College
- Tokyo Naval Cadet Academy

== Meteorological Stations and other Support Facilities ==
- Minami-Tori-shima - meteorological station with co-located airstrip (now Minami Torishima Airport, a MSDF run facility)
- Chichi jima naval base - Communications and Supply base. The island was the site of the primary long range transmitters used by the IJN and IJA to maintain contact with their far flung forces in World War II. Co-located with a seaplane base. Both are now MSDF facilities.
- Hiratsuka Naval Ammunitions Arsenal (平塚海軍火薬廠 Hiratsuka Kaigun Kayaku Shō?)
- Kamiseya torpedo assembly plant - Nowadays the site of Naval Support Facility Kamiseya, formerly Kamiseya Naval Radio Receiving Facility (US Navy)

== Other ==
This is a list of facilities outside Japan and under Japanese control:

- Piso Point, Eastern portion of Davao Gulf, Philippines
- Takeshiki (in Tsushima)
- Mekong (Pescadores)
- Ominato
- Alicante Naval Air Base, Negros, Visayas
- Amboina Naval Air Base
- Anibong Point Leyte
- Bacolod, Negros, Visayas
- Ballale, Fauro Island, Solomon Islands
- Bonis, Bougainville, Solomon Islands
- Brunei Bay, Brunei, North Borneo
- Buka Island, Solomon Islands
- Gasmata
- Kahili, Bougainville
- Kanoya
- Kara, Bougainville, Solomon Islands
- Kavieng
- Kendari
- Lae Lae
- Lahug, Cebu, Philippines
- Madang, New Guinea
- Munda, New Georgia, Solomon Islands
- Rabaul Naval Base
- Singapore Naval Base and Airfield, Malaya Singapore
- Palembang Airfield
- Peleliu Airfield, Palau Islands
- Penang submarine base, Malaya
- Saigon Airfield
- San Jose Airfield
- Saravia Airfield, Negros, Visayas
- Thudaumot Airfield
- Tuluvu Airfield, New Britain, Bismarck Archipelago
- Vila Airfield, Kolombangara, Solomon Islands
- Wewak Airfield, New Guinea, South West Pacific
- Camranh Bay Naval Anchorage, Indo China
- Faisi Naval Anchorage, Shortland Islands
- Lingga Roads Naval Anchorage, Malacca Strait
- Mako Naval Anchorage, Pescadores
- Samah Harbour, Naval Anchorage, Hainan Island, South East Asia
- Tawi-Tawi Naval Anchorage, Sulu
- Tonolei Naval Anchorage, Bougainville
- Palau Islands Naval Base
- Saipan Naval Base, Mariana Islands
- Kwajalein Atoll Naval Base (Submarine), Marshall Islands
- Taiwan Naval Base
- Buka Island Seaplane Base, Solomon Islands
- Rekata Bay Seaplane Base, Santa Isabel Island
- Shortland Islands Seaplane Base
- Tulagi Seaplane Base, Solomon Islands
