= Monterey (disambiguation) =

Monterey is a U.S. city on California's Central Coast in Monterey County on the southern edge of Monterey Bay.

Monterey may also refer to:

== Places ==
=== Australia ===
- Monterey, New South Wales
- Monterey, Mosman a heritage-listed residential building

=== Canada ===
- Monterey Park, Calgary, Alberta, a neighbourhood

=== United States ===
- Monterey AVA, a California wine region in Monterey County
- Monterey County, California
- Monterey Park, California
- Monterey (Odessa, Delaware), a historic house
- Monterey, Indiana
- Monterey, Kentucky
- Monterey, Louisiana
- Monterey, Massachusetts
- Monterey, Michigan
- Monterey, Mississippi
- Monterey, Missouri
- Monterey, Nebraska
- Monterey, Clermont County, Ohio
- Monterey, Mercer County, Ohio
- Monterey, Roanoke, Virginia, a neighborhood
- Monterey, Tennessee
- Monterey (Michie, Tennessee), a historic ridge-line village in McNairy County
- Monterey, Virginia, in Highland County
- Monterey (Roanoke, Virginia), a historic plantation house
- Monterey, Wisconsin

== Ships ==
- USS Monterey (1862), a screw tug that operated in San Francisco Bay from 1863 to 1892
- USS Monterey (BM-6), an armored monitor in service from 1893 to 1921
- USS Monterey (CVL-26), a light aircraft carrier of World War II, serving from 1943 to 1956
- USS Monterey (CG-61), a guided missile cruiser commissioned in 1990 and currently in active service
- SS Monterey (1897)
- SS Monterey, a 1931 Matson Lines passenger ship
- SS Monterey (1952)
- USAT Monterey, a passenger and freight ship
- Monterey, a Type C4-class ship

== Other ==
- Battle of Monterey, 1846
- Mercury Monterey, a full-size car produced by Mercury from 1950 to 1974
  - Mercury Monterey (minivan), a minivan based on the Ford Freestar produced from 2004 to 2007
- Monterey Formation, an extensive oil-rich geological formation of California
- Monterey Jack, a type of cheese
- Monterey Jazz Festival, an annual music festival that started in 1958
- Monterey Meatshop, a subsidiary of San Miguel Foods in the Philippines
- Monterey Pop Festival, a music festival that was held in 1967
- Project Monterey, a failed UNIX software development effort
- "Monterey" (Eric Burdon and the Animals song), a song by Eric Burdon & The Animals
- "Monterey" (Dean Brody song), a song by Dean Brody
- macOS Monterey, the 2021 release of Apple's desktop operating system macOS
- Holden Monterey, also known as the Opel Monterey and Vauxhall Monterey, an SUV based on the Isuzu Trooper

== See also ==
- Monterey Township (disambiguation)
- Monterrey (disambiguation)
- Monterrei
