= List of ships named SS Monterey =

SS Monterey is the name of the following ships:

- SS Monterey (1897), wrecked 1903
- SS Monterey (1931), sank 2000
- SS Monterey (1952), scrapped 2006

== See also ==
- Monterey (disambiguation)
- USAT Monterey
- USS Monterey
