= Battle of the Monterrey Valley =

1809 battle during the Peninsular War

- Part of the Peninsular War
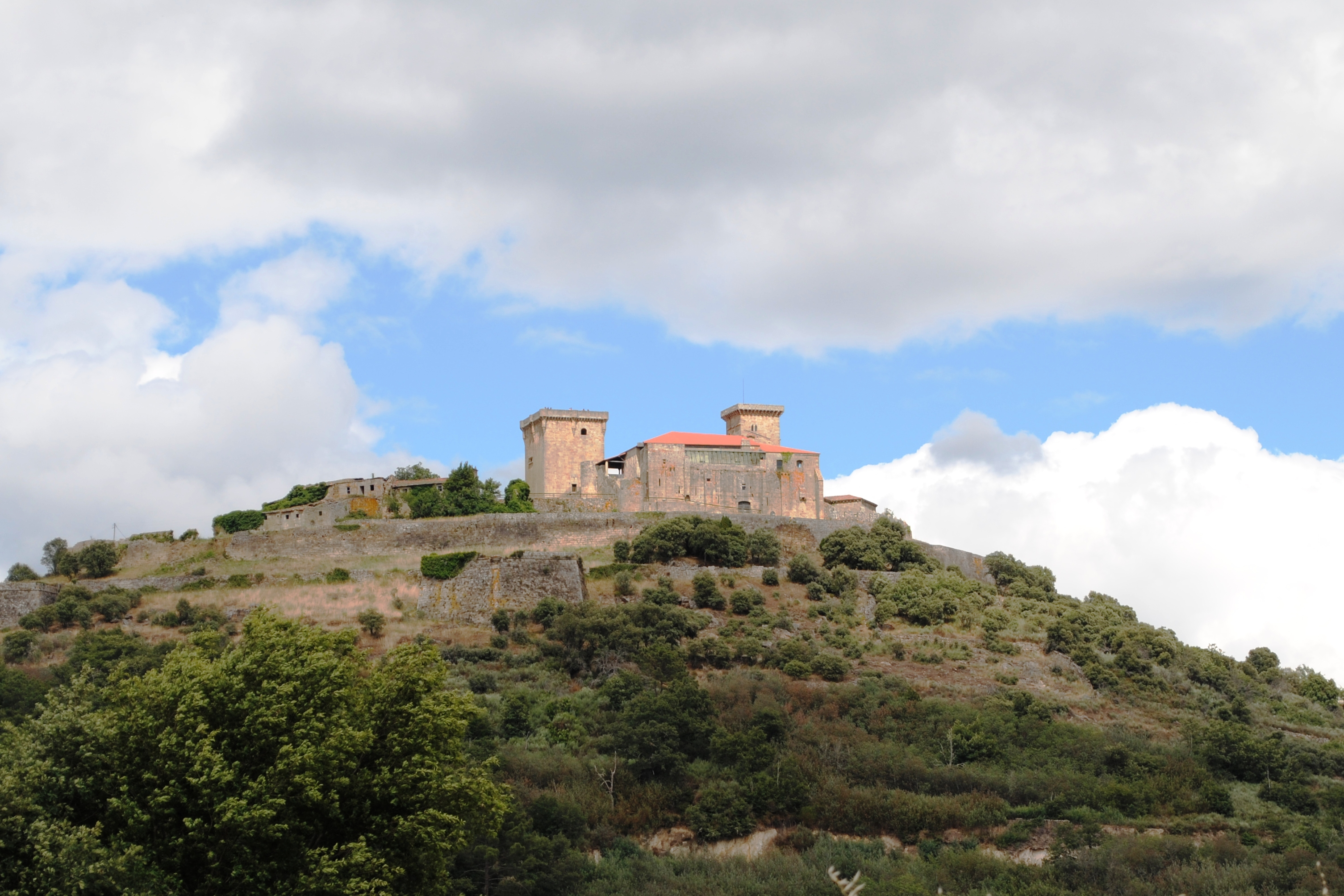
- View of the Castle of Monterrey
Date	6 – 7 March 1809
Location	Monterrei, Province of Ourense, Spain 41°56′49″N 7°26′58″W
Result	French victory

Belligerents
(First French Empire) French Empire	Kingdom of Portugal; Kingdom of Spain

Commanders and leaders
(First French Empire) Jean-de-Dieu Soult	Pedro Caro Sureda (Kingdom of Portugal) Bernardim Freire de Andrade (Kingdom of Portugal) Francisco da Silveira

The Battle of the Monterrey Valley (6 – 7 March 1809) was fought during the Peninsular War outside Monterrei, Orense, in Spain. Resulting in a French victory, it took place in the early stages of Marshal Soult's Second French invasion of Portugal.

== Background ==
Soult's army, after leaving La Coruña and on his way to invade Portugal, had been unable to cross the Minho river which separates Galicia from Portugal. He had initially planned to do so at Tuy, but the weather conditions were against him, so he headed inland, towards Ourense, to the northeast. Still in Spain, this was the first point where there was a bridge over the river.

The Spanish General La Romana had set up the headquarters of his Army of Galicia, numbering some 9,000 troops, at the Castle of Monterrey. And Soult knew that before penetrating the Portuguese border he would have to eliminate the threat of the Spanish forces stationed there.

== The battle ==
With Soult's three infantry divisions and a dragoon division, approaching, La Romana spiked the guns of the fortress and abandoned it, retreating towards Puebla de Sanabria. Franceschi's horsemen, following close behind, caught up with and attacked La Romana's rearguard, some 1,200 bayonets under General Mahy, at Osoño, just outside Monterrei, killing 300 men and taking 400 prisoners, as well as capturing three standards.

In the meantime, the Portuguese General Da Silveira, relying on La Romana, had taken up a position at Vilarelhos, on the right bank of the Tamega, leaving the defence of the left bank to the Spaniards, whom he supposed to be still occupying Monterrey and Verín.

On 6 March, the same day on which La Romana's Army of Galicia abandoned Monterrey, Silveira, at Villarelho, sent forward a line regiment and a mass of peasants to harass the flank of Soult's advance. Crossing into Spain, they came up against the leading column of Soult's main body—a brigade of Lahoussaye's division of dragoons, supported by Delaborde's division, near Villaza, a parish of Monterrey. They were beaten off by Foy, who routed them, capturing their sole piece of artillery.

The column fell back on Villarelho, and Silveira, hearing of Romana's departure, withdrew to a defensive position south of Chaves.

== Aftermath ==
Following the rout of La Romana, Soult stayed at Monterrey for three days waiting for his rearguard and his convoy of sick to join the main body of his forces, and then crossed the Portuguese frontier between Monterrey and Chaves on 9 March, and headed towards Porto, laying siege to Chaves, capturing the place on 12 March 1809.

== See also ==
- Timeline of the Peninsular War
