= USS Monterey =

USS Monterey may refer to:

- USS Monterey (1862), was a screw tug that operated in San Francisco Bay from 1863 to 1892
- USS Monterey (BM-6), was an armored monitor in service from 1893 to 1921
- USS Monterey (CVL-26), was a light aircraft carrier of World War II, serving from 1943 to 1956
- USS Monterey (CG-61), is a guided missile cruiser commissioned in 1990 and decommissioned in 2022

== See also ==
- SS Monterey (1931, completed 1932 and shown in Lloyd's as 1932), was an ocean liner of 18,017 GRT that saw service as a War Shipping Administration troopship in World War II. Due to its close association with Army troop transport this ship is sometimes labeled USAT, though it was never Army operated. Sunk in 2000 while under tow.
- USAT Monterey was the ex Puerto Rico, ex Hati of 5,236 GRT acquired by the War Shipping Administration 26 September 1942 and allocated to the U.S. Army under bareboat charter. Note: This ship operated at the same time as the Matson liner SS Monterey and has a 1932 date that is also seen for the larger ship as that was the completion date.
- SS Monterey (1952), a Matson cruise ship constructed from a 1952 C4 Mariner-class hull formerly named Free State Mariner; renamed Monte in 2006 to be broken up for scrap in 2007
