= Yokozawa Shōgen =

Christian Japanese samurai of the sixteenth century

Yokozawa Shōgen (横沢将監) was a Japanese samurai of the sixteenth century, who served Date Masamune, ruler of the Sendai domain.

In September 1616, under an order by Date Masamune, Yokozawa went to Mexico on the San Juan Bautista in order to fetch his compatriot Hasekura Rokuemon who was coming back from an embassy to Europe.

His trip proved difficult, and around one hundred men on the ship died en route. He arrived in Acapulco in May 1617. He remitted a letter and some merchandise from Date Masamune, and was baptized, receiving the name of Don Alonzo Hacaldo.

The ship sailed in April 1618 for a fourth trans-Pacific travel, and arrived in the Philippines, where she was bought by the local Spanish government in order to "reinforce defenses against Holland forces by all means possible". Luis Sotelo chose to remain in the Philippines due to the worsening anti-Christian situation in Japan, but Yokozawa Shogen managed to leave for Japan together with Hasekura Rokuemon on a trade ship in August 1620.

After his arrival in Japan, Yokozawa is recorded to have renounced the Christian faith and burnt all his Christian-related belongings.

In 1621 however, Yokozawa Shogen is known to have signed a letter to the Pope together with seventeen other Christians from Northern Japan. His name comes in second place after Goto Juan (後藤寿庵).

Neither the later life of Yokozawa, or his grave's location, are known.
