= Monterrey (disambiguation) =

Monterrey is the capital and largest city of the northeastern state of Nuevo León, Mexico.

Monterrey may also refer to:

== Places ==
- Monterrey, Casanare, a town and municipality in the Casanare Department, Colombia
- Monterrey International Airport, Nuevo León, Mexico
- Monterrey, Orense, Spain, a municipality
- Monterrey, Ancash, Peru, a town
- Monterey, California, United States, a city

== Other ==
- related to the city of Monterrey in Nuevo León, Mexico
  - Battle of Monterrey
  - Club de Fútbol Monterrey, an association football team from Monterrey, Nuevo León
  - Monterrey Consensus, international agreement from the 2002 UN Monterrey Conference

== See also ==
- Monterey (disambiguation)
- Monterrei
- Monterrei (DO)
