= Sasada =

Sasada (written: 笹田) is a Japanese surname. Notable people with the surname include:

- Ludovicus Sasada (1598–1624), Japanese Roman Catholic saint
- Natsumi Sasada (笹田 夏実, born 1995), Japanese artistic gymnast
