= Monterey Township =

Monterey Township may refer to the following places in the United States:

- Monterey Township, Michigan
- Monterey Township, Cuming County, Nebraska
- Monterey Township, Putnam County, Ohio

== See also ==
- Monterey (disambiguation)
