= Verín =

- Municipality
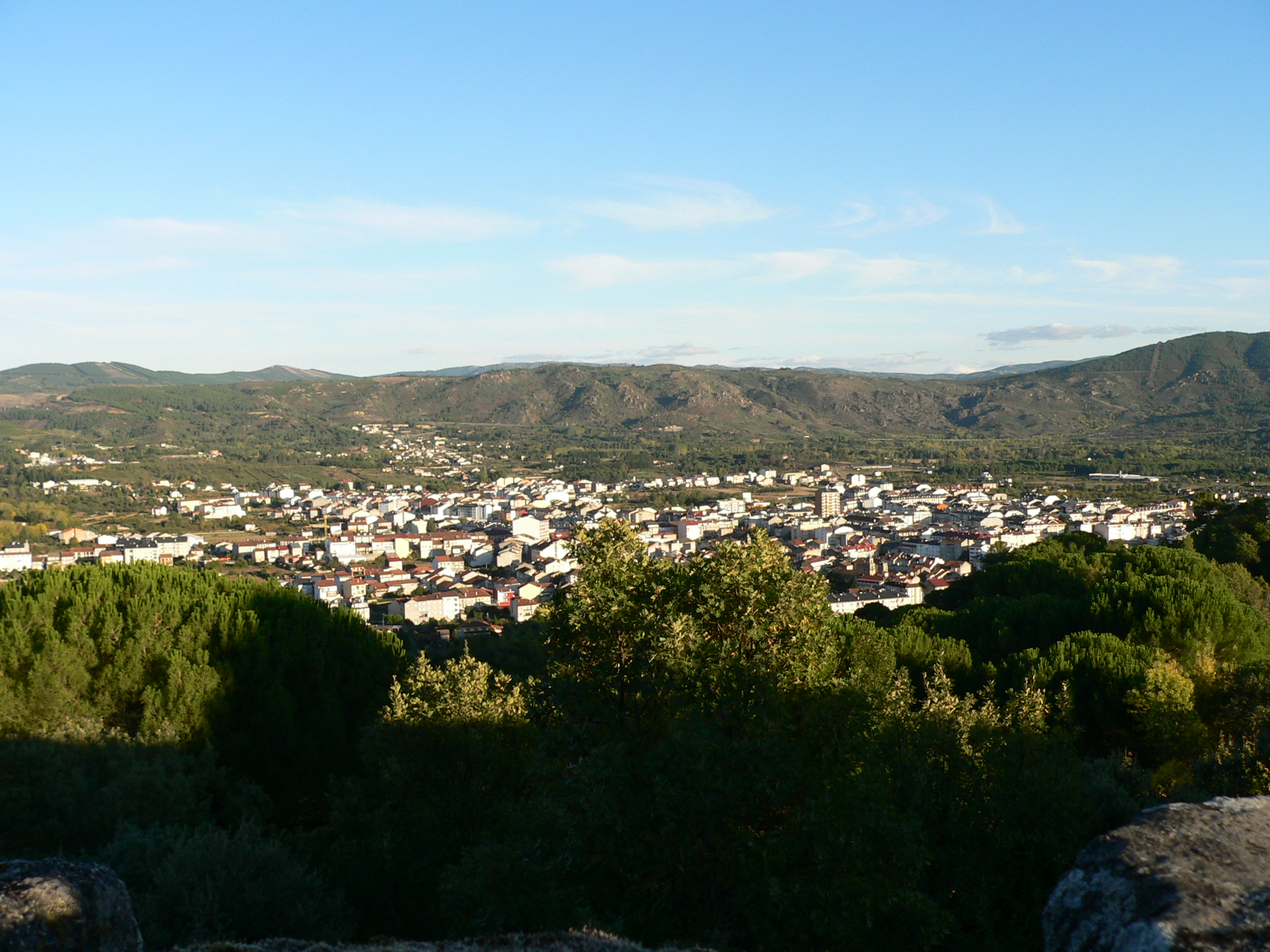
- Verín as seen from the Castle of Monterrei

- Coat of arms
- Location of Verín
- Coordinates: 41°56′27″N 7°26′9″W
- Country: Spain
- Autonomous community: Galicia
- Province: Ourense
- Comarca: Verín

Government
  - Alcalde: Gerardo Seoane (PSdeG–PSOE/BNG)

Area
  - Total: 94.1 km^{2} (36.3 sq mi)
- Elevation: 373 m (1,224 ft)

Population (2025-01-01)
  - Total: 13,956
  - Density: 148/km^{2} (384/sq mi)
- Demonym(s): verinense, verinés, -a
- Time zone: UTC+1 (CET)
  - Summer (DST): UTC+2 (CEST)
- Website: Official website

Verín is a town and municipality in the southeast of the province of Ourense, in the autonomous community of Galicia, Spain. The population of the municipality is about 14,433. It is located 70 kilometers east of the provincial capital of Ourense and 15 kilometers north of the Portuguese city of Chaves. The Tâmega River flows through the town. In the Middle Ages it was known as Santa María de Verín.

The town is linked with Madrid and Ourense by the four-lane A-52 (Autovia das Rias Baixas) and by the N-525. The main railway line linking Ourense to Madrid passes through mountains north of the town, but the nearest station is at La Gudiña, 31 km to the east.

Verín is a town of services with declining agricultural activity. There is a denominated wine region—Monterrei—located in the surrounding area. There are also three mineral water bottling plants in the town: Cabreiroá, Fontenova and Sousas.

Carnival here is one of the most original in Spain with the Cigarrón, masked figures running through the streets brandishing whips and making an interesting sound caused by cow bells tied to their waists (See zanpantzar for a similar tradition in the Pyrenees). Everything has a medieval air, with little influence from the Brazilian-style carnival, which has become popular in other Spanish and Portuguese cities.

Verín major tourist site is actually in the neighboring Monterrei, which is the Castle of Monterrei, a huge complex looming over the rather non-descript urban area. To reach the castle you drive about two kilometers in the direction of Ourense on the old highway, turning off on the right to climb two kilometers, passing a winery on the left. There is a parador next to the castle.

The Castle of Monterrei played an important role throughout the Portuguese-Spanish wars, having been strategically built on the frontier for the purpose. It was more than a castle since included within the perimeter were a monastery, a hospital and a small town which was abandoned in the 19th century. The castle itself is more impressive from afar than at closer look, but the view from the heights is worth the drive up. At night it is lit up and you can see it for miles on clear nights, even from the hills of Chaves in neighboring Portugal.

== Notable residents ==
- Eloy Luis André - psychologist, philosopher, educator and Galician writer
- Pedro Vásquez - Dominican (Order of Preachers) Priest and Martyr of Japan
