= Ludovicus Baba =

17th-century Japanese Christian martyr

Blessed Ludovicus Baba OFM
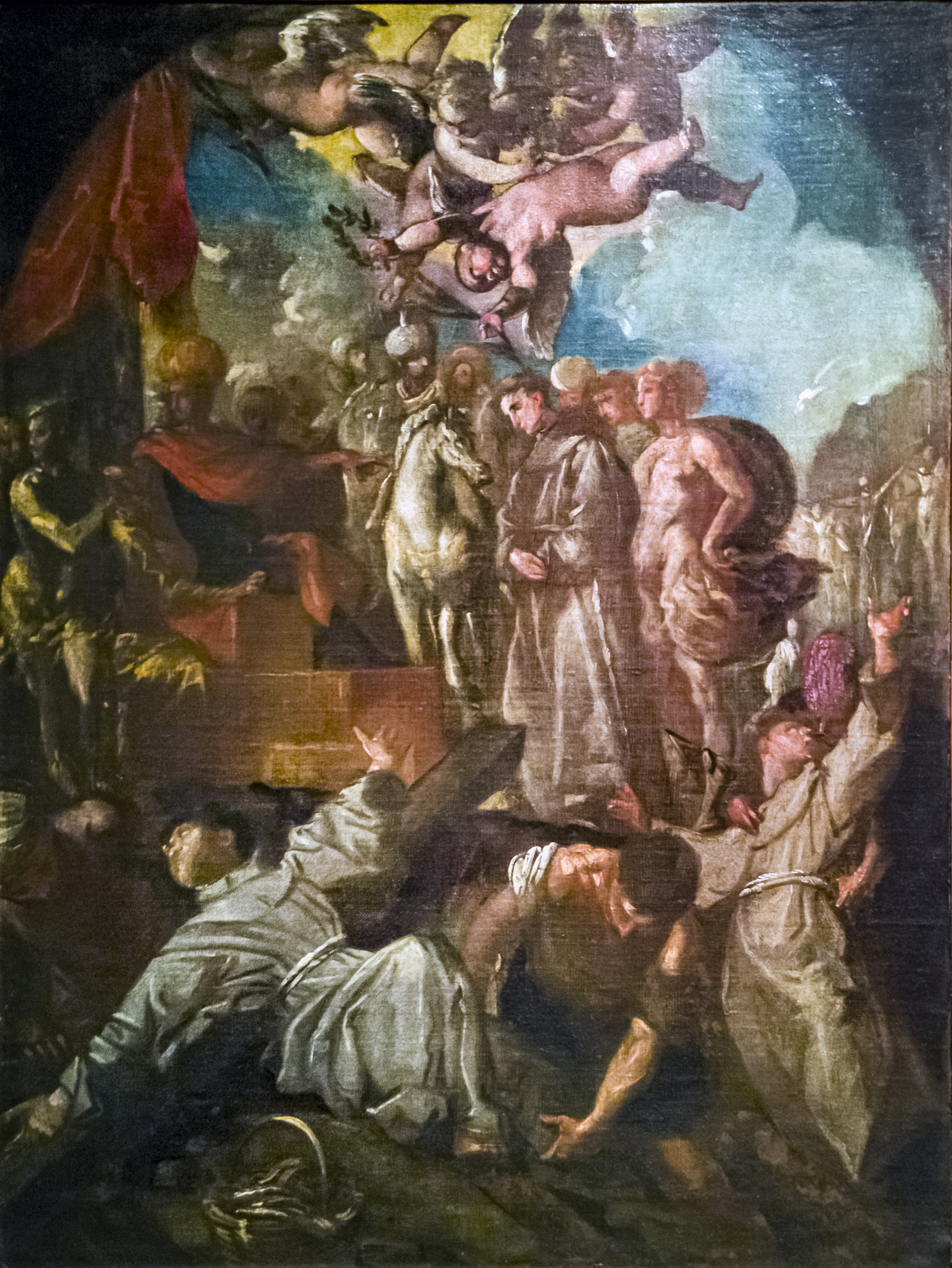
- Martyrdom of the Franciscans in Nagasaki
- Born: Unknown; Japan
- Died: 25 August 1624; Ōmura, Japan
- Venerated in: Roman Catholic Church
- Beatified: 7 July 1867 by Pope Pius IX
- Feast: 25 August

Ludovicus Baba, OFM, also known as Louis Baba or ルイス馬場 (died 25 August 1624) was a Franciscan Tertiary from Japan. He was beatified in July 1867 by Pope Pius IX.

== Early life ==
Ludovicus Baba was born in Japan. He was befriended by a young missionary friar, Luis Sotelo, from the Franciscan Order.

== Servant of Father Sotelo ==
Luis Sotelo tried to establish a Franciscan church in the area of Edo. The church was destroyed in 1612, following the interdiction of Christianity in the territories of the Tokugawa shogunate on 21 April 1612. After a period of intense missionary activity by the Catholic Church, Tokugawa Hidetada, the second shōgun of the Tokugawa dynasty, issued a decree which banned the practice and teaching of the Christian faith, and under the threat of loss of life, all the missionaries had to leave Japan. This decree started the bloody persecution of Christians, which lasted several decades.

After healing a concubine of the powerful daimyō of Sendai, Date Masamune, in Edo, Sotelo was invited to the northern part of Japan, in the area controlled by Date, under whom Christianity was still allowed. He returned to Tokyo the following year and constructed and inaugurated a new church on 12 May 1613, in the area of Asakusa Torigoe. The Bakufu reacted by arresting the Christians, and Sotelo himself was put in the Kodenma-chō prison. Seven fellow Japanese Christians, who had been arrested with Sotelo, were executed on 1 July, but he was freed following a special request by Date Masamune.

Fluent in Japanese, Sotelo planned and acted as translator on a Japanese embassy sent by Date Masamune to Madrid on 28 October 1613. Baba accompanied Sotelo and the representatives of Japan, on their voyage to Europe, as his personal servant. The embassy was headed by Hasekura Rokuemon Tsunenaga, and crossed the Pacific Ocean to Acapulco on board the Japanese-built galleon San Juan Bautista. Baba cooked and resided with Sotelo during their nine and-a-half months stay in Mexico in 1614. The embassy continued to Vera Cruz and Sanlúcar de Barrameda, Seville, and Madrid. Sotelo had the Japanese receive baptism while in Madrid, before accompanying them to an audience with Pope Paul V in Rome. The embassy was a product of ambitions of Sotelo to increase the spread of the church in Japan and of Date Masamune to provide more priests for the churches of his Christian subjects and to establish trade between Sendai and New Spain, and it had the approval of the shogun, Tokugawa Ieyasu.

Pope Paul V appointed Sotelo to be new Bishop of Ōshū (in Northern Honshū). When the party returned to Manila in June 1618, Bishop-elect Sotelo kept his personal secretary, Ludovicus Sasada, and his servant, Baba, near.

== Return to Japan and martyrdom ==
In 1622, Sotelo, Sasada and Baba, set sail for Japan, disguised as merchants. As the Chinese captain suspected them for religious missionaries, they were surrendered to governmental authorities at Nagasaki. Within six months, these three prisoners were transferred to the new prison at Ōmura. Their imprisonment almost lasted for two years, however during this time, Baba was received into the Third Order Secular of Saint Francis by Sotelo. Two other missionary priests, Dominican Pedro Vásquez and Jesuit Miguel de Carvalho, eventually joined these three Franciscans in captivity.

Their life in the Ōmura prison was like a friary. These priests performed their religious exercises and celebrated Holy Mass. The imprisoned Christians at the risk of their lives procured what was needed. On 24 August, a death sentence was ordered. When they received the news they sang the Te Deum. At ten in the morning, they were taken by boat to the place of execution. They were tied to stakes and a fire was placed around them. Sotelo was placed in the center and the two Japanese were on the outside of the circle. Since the fire burned the ropes of the two Japanese Franciscans, Sasada and Baba prostrated themselves towards the center stake and asked for the Bishop-elect's blessing. Sotelo invoked God's blessing upon them and they returned to their stakes until the fire and smoke overcame them. As Sotelo was the farthest from the flames, the executioners put more wood on the fire closer to him. After these martyrs died, the soldiers burned their remains in another fire and took their ashes in a boat to dispose of them at sea, to prevent them being carried away by the Christians, even though a witness was able to collect some of Pedro Vásquez's cremains and had them deposited in a Jesuit Church in the Philippines.

Baba was beatified by Pope Pius IX on 7 July 1867. In the Roman Catholic Church, his feast day is celebrated on 25 August, as well as 10 September, the anniversary of the massacre of 205 Japanese martyrs.
