= Miguel de Carvalho =

17th-century Portuguese Catholic missionary and martyr

Blessed Miguel de Carvalho SJ
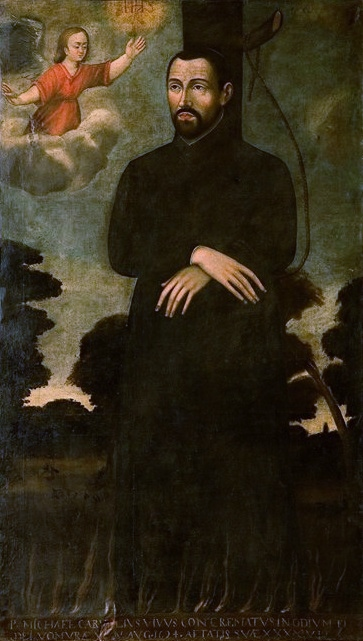
- Born: 1579; Braga, Kingdom of Portugal
- Died: 25 August 1624; Ōmura, Japan
- Venerated in: Roman Catholic Church
- Beatified: 7 July 1867
- Feast: 25 August

Miguel de Carvalho SJ, also known as Michael Carvalho, (1579 – 25 August 1624) was a Roman Catholic missionary from Portugal. He was beatified in July 1867 by Pope Pius IX.

== Biography ==
Miguel was born in Braga, in 1579, to a noble and wealthy family. In 1597, he joined the Society of Jesus in Coimbra. In 1602, he studied in Portuguese India. After completing his studies of philosophy and theology at St. Paul's College in Goa, he was ordained to the priesthood. For several years, his vocation was a professor of theology at the Academy On 21 August 1621, he arrived in Japan, after traveling from Portuguese India through Manila, Malay, and Portuguese Macau. The situation in Japan was resulting in measures aimed at reducing the impact of the growing number of Catholics in social life. After a period of intense missionary activity by the Catholic Church, Hidetada Tokugawa, the second shōgun of the Tokugawa dynasty, issued a decree which banned the practice and teaching of the Christian faith, and under the threat of loss of life, all the missionaries had to leave Japan. This decree started the bloody persecution of Christians, which lasted several decades.

Martyrdom of Miguel de Carvalho

On Amakusa, Carvalho hid in plain view, disguised as a soldier for two years, where he assimilated the Japanese language and principles of inculturation. When the local governor openly confessed that Carvalho was a missionary, and the actual purpose of his stay was to preach and convert the locals to Christianity, he was expelled from the island. With the help of fellow believers, he went to Nagasaki, where the Jesuit Provincial, Francisco Pacheco advised him to remain prudent in the implementation of the apostolate and directed him to care for a small group living in a suburban area. On 22 July 1623, as he returned from the pastoral ministry in Ōmura, Carvalho was arrested due to an accusation from an informant. In the local prison, he joined Franciscan Luis Sotelo, Dominican Pedro Vásquez, and two Japanese Franciscans, Ludovicus Sasada and tertiary Ludovicus Baba. Miguel spent his time in captivity with the celebration of daily Mass and prayer. On 24 August, a death sentence was ordered, which was performed the next day in Ōmura. On 25 August 1624, Carvalho and his companions were burned at the stake.

== Legacy ==
The steadfastness and joy that he showed convicts in the face of martyrdom for the faith, aroused the admiration of his contemporaries.

Carvalho was beatified by Pope Pius IX on 7 July 1867. The death of the martyrs is commemorated by an obelisk in Ōmura.

In the Roman Catholic Church, Carvalho's feast day is celebrated on 25 August, as well as 10 September, the anniversary of the massacre of 205 Japanese martyrs in Ōmura, and the Jesuits mention it also 4 February.

Carvalho is the patron saint of the department of philosophy at the Catholic University of Portugal, Braga Campus.
