= Eloy Luis André =

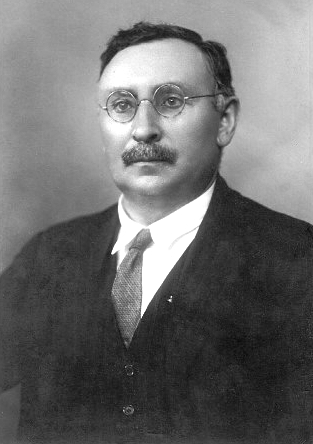
Eloy Luis André.

Eloy Anselmo Luis y André (22 June 1876 – 24 May 1935) was a Spanish psychologist, philosopher, educator and Galician writer.

== Biography ==
He was born on 22 June 1876 in the Galician town of Verín. While at the University of Salamanca, during the course of 1899-1900 he conducted advanced philosophy studies at the universities of Leuven, Brussels and Paris. In February 1904 he became full professor of psychology, logic, ethics and rudiments of law at the Institute of Soria, transferring that same year to the same professorship at the Institute of Ourense, where he created a laboratory of experimental psychology, just as he would later at the Institute of Toledo. In August 1909 he was appointed full professor of psychology, logic and ethics at the Advanced School of Teaching in Madrid.

In 1910-11 he worked with Wilhelm Wundt in Leipzig, Germany. André, who translated various works by Wundt into Spanish, helped introduce his ideas into Spain.

He died in Madrid on 24 May 1935.

== Works ==
Galleguismo. Lucha por la personalidad nacional y la cultura.

- El histrionismo español: ensayo de psicología política. Barcelona. 1906.
- Ética española, problemas de moral contemporánea. Madrid. 1910.
- La mentalidad alemána. Madrid. 1914.
- La cultura alemana. Madrid, 1916.
- La educación de la adolescencia. Madrid. 1916.
- Dos idearios y dos democracias. Madrid. 1919.
- Sistema de Filosofía de los Valores. Toledo. 1919.
- Elementos de Psicología. Madrid. 1919.
- Ética individual y social. Madrid. 1920.
- Nociones de educación cívica, jurídica y económica. Madrid. 1921.
- Resumen de educación cívica, jurídica y económica. Madrid. 1924.
- Nociones de psicología experimental. Madrid. 1924.
- Sistema de Filosofía de los Valores. Lógica. Morfología mental. Madrid. 1925.
- El ferrocarril del Príncipe de Asturias. Madrid. 1926.
- El espíritu nuevo en la educación española. Madrid. 1926.
- Deontología. Breviario de Moral Práctica. Madrid. 1928.
- Rudimentos de Derecho español. Madrid. 1929.
- Ideario político de Espinosa. Análisis, comentario y crítica del ‘Tratado Teológico Político’. Madrid. 1930.
- Psicología experimental. Madrid. 1931.
- Españolismo: prasologio: pueblo y conciencia nacional. Madrid. 1931.
- Galleguismo. Lucha por la personalidad nacional y la cultura. Ensayos. Madrid. 1931.

Translations

- Léxico de filosofía, 1908.
- Filósofos contemporáneos, 1909.
- Introducción a la Filosofía, I and II, 1911 and 1912.
- La vida. Su valor y su significación, 1912.
- Sistema de Filosofía Científica, 1 and 2, 1913.

== Bibliography ==
- Bande Rodríguez, Enrique (1987). Teoría política de D. Eloy Luís André. Berrande, Vilardevós: Asociación Cultural Andruquiña.
- Alemán; Castro; Lafuente (2010). Eloy Luis André y la psicología científica en la España de la Restauración (DVD-Vídeo). UNED. ISBN 9788436256475 (in Spanish).
- Camoira Vega, César (ed.) (2004): Eloy Luis André. Poesía galega. Santiago de Compostela, CRPIH. ISBN 978-84-453-5131-4 (in Galician).
- Carpintero Capell, Heliodoro (1994). Historia de la psicología en España, Madrid, Eudema Universidad. ISBN 84-7754-185-X (in Spanish).
- Castro; Castro; Sánchez (1993): "Una aproximación biográfica a la figura de Eloy Luis André (1876-1935) desde la historia de la Psicología", Rev. Hist. Psicología, v. 14, nº 3-4 (in Spanish).
- Couceiro Freijomil, Antonio (1951–53). Diccionario bio-bibliográfico de escritores II. Bibliófilos Gallegos. p. 347 (in Spanish).
- Guijarro, V. (2018). Aulas abiertas, profesores viajeros y renovación de la enseñanza secundaria…. Dykinson. pp. 373–378. ISBN 978-84-1324-019-0.
- López Vázquez, Ramón (2002). Eloy Luis André. Baía Pensamento. A Coruña: Baía Edicións. ISBN 978-84-89803-90-9 (in Galician).
- ——— (2016). Un regeneracionismo olvidado. Escritos de un republicano desde la filosofía, la pedagogía y la psicología. Analecta. ISBN 978-84-92489-70-1 (in Spanish).
- Santiago Pérez; Dosil Maceira: "Juan Vicente Viqueira e Eloy Luís André: dous psicólogos galegos de principios de século", en EDUGA, nº 14, feb. 1997 (in Galician).
- "Eloy Anselmo Luis y André". Enciclopedia Universal Ilustrada Europeo-Americana. Espasa-Calpe. 1932. apéndice. tomo 6. pp. 1322-1323 (in Spanish).
- "Luis André, Eloi". Diccionario enciclopédico galego universal 39. La Voz de Galicia. 2003-2004. p. 62. ISBN 84-7680-429-6 (in Galician).
- "Luis André, Eloi". Dicionario biográfico de Galicia 2. Ir Indo Edicións. 2010-2011. p. 264 (in Galician).
- "Luis André, Eloy". Diciopedia do século 21 2. Do Cumio, Galaxia e do Castro. 2006. p. 1260. ISBN 978-84-8288-942-9 (in Galician).
- "Luis André, Eloi". Enciclopedia Galega Universal 11. Ir Indo. 1999-2002. p. 295. ISBN 84-7680-288-9 (in Galician).
- "Luis André, Eloy". Gran Enciclopedia Galega Silverio Cañada (DVD). El Progreso. 2005. ISBN 84-87804-88-8 (in Galician).
- Bueno Sánchez, Gustavo (2009). "Eloy Luis André 1876-1935". Proyecto Filosofía en español. Fundación Gustavo Bueno.
