= Ludovicus Sasada =

17th-century Japanese Christian martyr

Blessed Ludovicus Sasada OFM
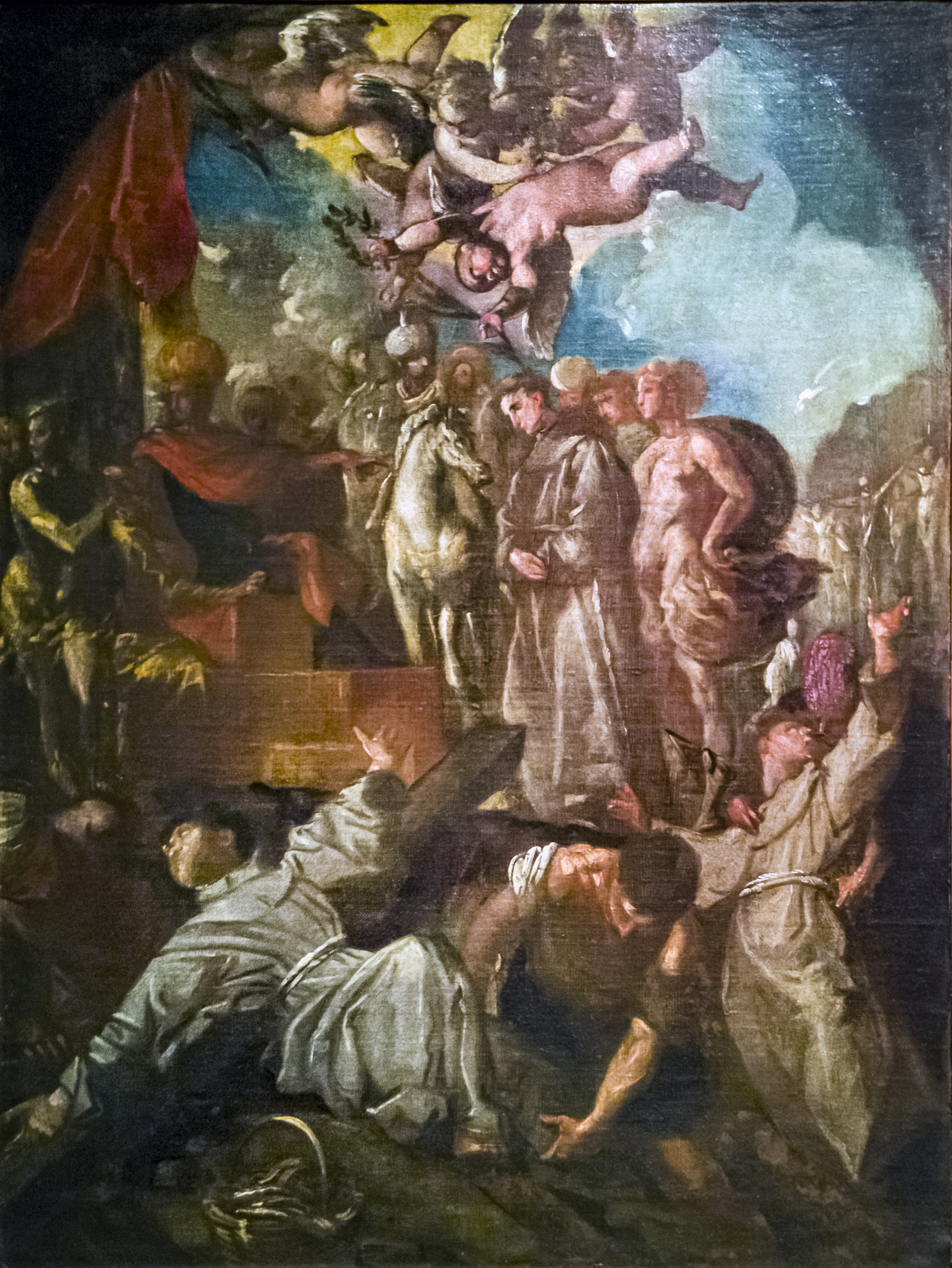
- Martyrdom of the Franciscans in Nagasaki
- Born: 1598; Edo, Japan
- Died: 25 August 1624; Ōmura, Japan
- Venerated in: Catholic Church
- Beatified: 7 July 1867 by Pope Pius IX
- Feast: 25 August

Ludovicus Sasada, OFM, also known as Louis Sasada or ルイス笹田, (1598 – 25 August 1624) was a Catholic priest from Japan and a member of the Order of Friars Minor. He was beatified in July 1867 by Pope Pius IX.

== Early life ==
Ludovicus Sasada was born in Edo, present-day Tokyo, around 1598, to a pious Christian family. His family was befriended by a young missionary friar, Luis Sotelo, from the Franciscan Order.

== Father Sotelo ==
Luis Sotelo tried to establish a Franciscan church in the area of Edo. The church was destroyed in 1612, following the interdiction of Christianity in the territories of the Tokugawa shogunate on 21 April 1612. After a period of intense missionary activity by the Catholic Church, Tokugawa Hidetada, the second shōgun of the Tokugawa dynasty, issued a decree which banned the practice and teaching of the Christian faith, and under the threat of loss of life, all the missionaries had to leave Japan. This decree started the bloody persecution of Christians, which lasted several decades.

After the healing of a concubine of the powerful daimyō of Sendai, Date Masamune, in Edo, Sotelo was invited to the northern part of Japan, in the area controlled by Date, under whom Christianity was still allowed. He came back to Tokyo the following year and constructed and inaugurated a new church on 12 May 1613, in the area of Asakusa Torigoe. The Bakufu reacted by arresting the Christians, and Sotelo himself was put in the Kodenma-chō prison. Seven fellow Japanese Christians, who had been arrested with Sotelo, were executed on 1 July, but he was freed following a special request by Date Masamune.

Sotelo, fluent in Japanese, planned and acted as translator on a Japanese embassy sent by Date Masamune to Madrid on 28 October 1613. The embassy was headed by Hasekura Rokuemon Tsunenaga, and crossed the Pacific Ocean to Acapulco on board the Japanese-built galleon San Juan Bautista. The embassy continued to Veracruz and Sanlucar de Barrameda, Seville, and Madrid. Luis had the Japanese receive baptism in Madrid, before accompanying them to an audience with Pope Paul V in Rome. The embassy was a product of ambitions of Sotelo to increase the spread of the church in Japan and of Date Masamune to provide more priests for the churches of his Christian subjects and to establish trade between Sendai and New Spain, and it had the approval of the shogun, Ieyasu Tokugawa.

== Seminary and priesthood ==
Ludovicus Sasada's father, Michael was beheaded on 16 August 1613, as a result of his Christian beliefs. Young Sasada accompanied Sotelo and the representatives of Japan, on their voyage to Europe. He requested to remain in Mexico, while the others proceeded to Madrid, and entered the convent of San Pedro and San Pablo in Valladolid, Michoacán, where he became a Franciscan brother and started his studies for the priesthood.

Several years later, Sotelo, now Bishop-elect of Ōshū (in Northern Honshū), returned to Mexico en route to Japan, where he chose Sasada as his personal secretary. The party returned to Manila in June 1618, where Sasada completed his studies for priesthood, with Sotelo instructing him. Because he was not of canonical age, a special dispensation was obtained and he was ordained a priest in Manila.

== Return to Japan and martyrdom ==
In 1622, Sotelo, Sasada and Ludovicus Baba (personal servant to Father Sotelo), set sail for Japan, disguised as merchants. As the Chinese captain suspected them for religious missionaries, they were surrendered to governmental authorities at Nagasaki. Within six months, these three prisoners were transferred to the new prison at Ōmura. Their imprisonment almost lasted for two years. Two other missionary priests, Dominican Pedro Vásquez and Jesuit Miguel de Carvalho, eventually joined these three Franciscans in captivity.

Their life in the Ōmura prison was like a friary. These priests performed their religious exercises and celebrated Holy Mass. The imprisoned Christians at the risk of their lives procured what was needed. On 24 August, a death sentence was ordered. When they received the news they sang the Te Deum. At ten in the morning, they were taken by boat to the place of execution. They were tied to stakes and a fire was placed around them. Sotelo was placed in the center and the two Japanese were on the outside of the circle. Since the fire burned the ropes of the two Japanese Franciscans, they prostrated themselves towards the center stake and asked for the Bishop-elect's blessing. Sotelo invoked God's blessing upon them and they returned to their stakes until they were overcome by the fire and smoke. After these martyrs died, the soldiers burned their remains in another fire and took their ashes in a boat to throw dispose of them into the sea, to prevent them being carried away by the Christians, even though a witness was able to collect some of Pedro Vásquez's cremains and had them deposited in a Jesuit Church in the Philippines.

Sasada was beatified by Pope Pius IX on 7 July 1867. In the Roman Catholic Church, his feast day is celebrated on 25 August, as well as 10 September, the anniversary of the massacre of 205 Japanese martyrs.
