= Castle of Monterrey =

Building in Monterrei, Galicia, Spain

Coordinates: 41.9470°N 7.4494°W

- Castelo de Monterrei (Galician); Castillo de Monterrey (Spanish)
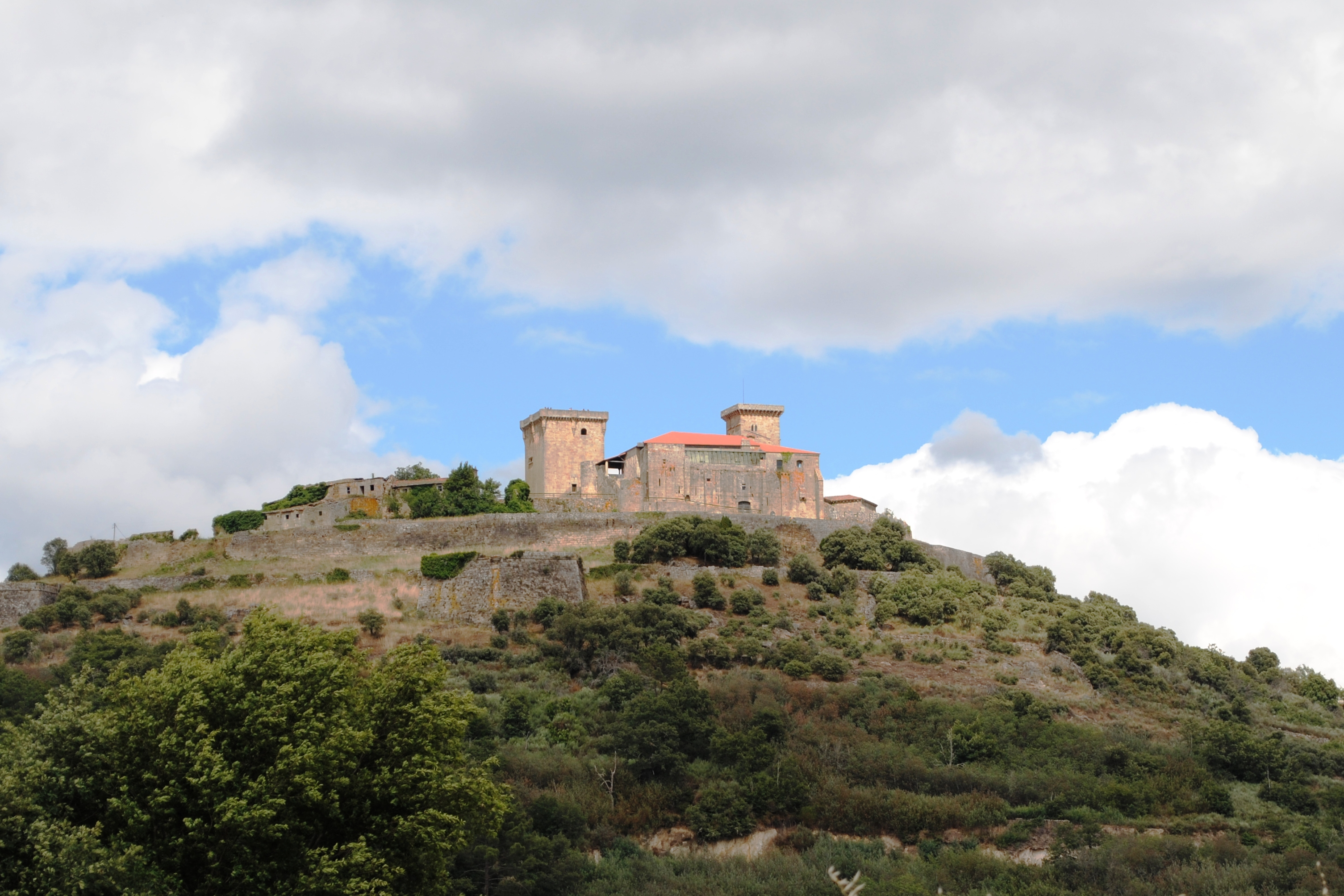
- View of the castle of Monterrey
- Alternative names: Parador Castillo de Monterrei
- Hotel chain: Paradores

General information
- Location: Monterrei (Ourense), Spain

Website
- Parador Castillo de Monterrei

Spanish Cultural Heritage
- Type: Non-movable
- Criteria: Monument
- Designated: 3 June 1931
- Reference no.: RI-51-0000781

The Castle of Monterrey is a 15th-century castle at Monterrei, in Ourense, Galicia. It is located at what was then a strategic point on the frontier between the kingdoms of Galicia and Portugal.

It is now a hotel, part of the network of Paradores de Turismo de España.

== History ==
Although Alfonso IX of León had built a fortress, in 1223, over the ruins of an old "Castro de Baronceli", re-naming it "Monte Rey" (King's Hill), his feud with the local monks, part of his feud with Pope Celestine III, led to it being demolished shortly thereafter. In 1262, his grandson, Alfonso X of Castile, also known as Alfonso the Wise, managed to establish a castle there.

The buildings of the current castle date back to Sancho Sánchez de Ulloa (1442–1505), 1st Count of Monterrey, who built the 22-metre high keep, the "Torre de Don Sancho", in 1482, although the castle's other keep, the "Torre das Damas" (19 metres), was possibly built earlier.

Major extensions, including convents for the orders of the Franciscans and the Jesuits, were later added in the 17th century by Philip IV of Spain's military engineers, Juan de Villarroel and Carlos de Grunemberg.

=== Peninsular War ===
In the early stages of Marshal Soult's Second French invasion of Portugal, the Spanish General La Romana had set up the headquarters of his Army of Galicia, numbering some 9,000 troops, at Monterrei where, at the Battle of Monterrey (6 – 7 March 1809), the French army the routed the Spanish forces.

==== Background ====
Soult, having left La Coruña and on his way to invade Portugal, had been unable to cross the Minho river which separates Galicia from Portugal. He had initially planned to do so at Tuy, but the weather conditions were against him, so he headed inland, towards Ourense, to the northeast. Still in Spain, this was the first point where there was a bridge over the river, but Soult knew that before penetrating the Portuguese border he would have to eliminate the threat of the Spanish forces stationed there.

Following the rout of La Romana, Soult stayed on at Monterrei for three days waiting for his rearguard and his convoy of sick to join the main body of his forces, and then crossed the Portuguese frontier between Monterey and Chaves on 9 March, and headed towards Porto, laying siege to Chaves, which he captured on 12 March 1809.

=== 21st century ===
In 2015, the Xunta de Galicia signed a 75-year concession to the network of Paradores de Turismo de España. However, in 2016, the High Court of Justice of Galicia confirmed the annulment of the planning permission the Council of Monterrei had previously given for converting the castle into a hotel. It is now a hotel belonging to the network of Paradores.
