= Monterey (Roanoke, Virginia) =

Historic house in Virginia, United States

- U.S. National Register of Historic Places
- Virginia Landmarks Register
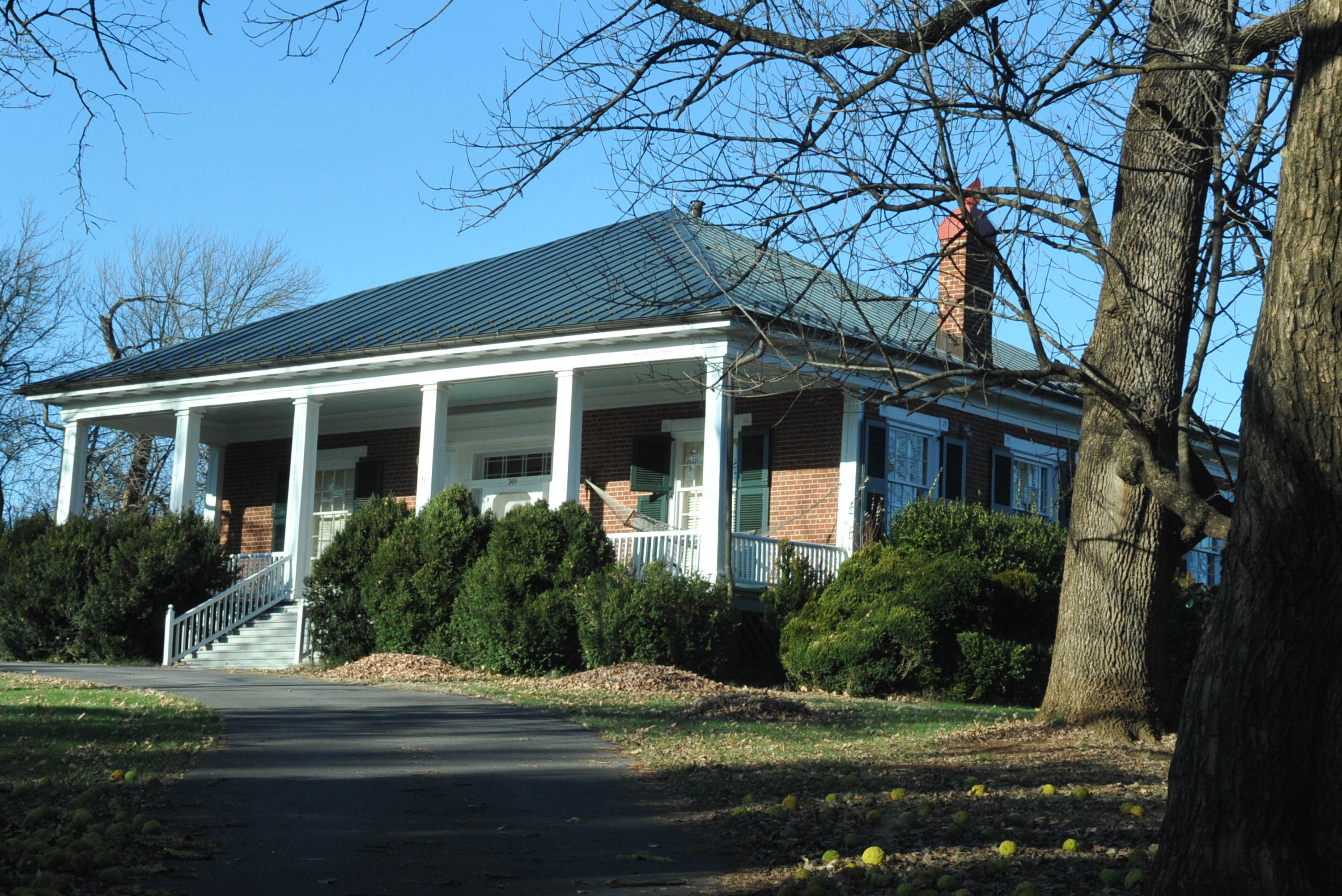

- Location within Virginia Location within the United States
- Location: Tinker Creek Lane NE, Roanoke, Virginia
- Coordinates: 37°18′30″N 79°54′49″W
- Area: 117 acres (47 ha)
- Built: c. 1845
- Architectural style: Greek Revival
- NRHP reference No.: 74002146
- VLR No.: 128-0035

Significant dates
- Added to NRHP: July 30, 1974
- Designated VLR: April 16, 1974

Monterey is a historic plantation house located at Roanoke, Virginia. It was built about 1845, and is a two-story, banked, Greek Revival style brick dwelling with a spreading hipped roof. Two additions were made to the original house after 1871, which gives it an "L"-shape. The front facade features a full-width verandah style porch and the rear has a two-story gallery. Also on the property is a contributing smoke house.

It was listed on the National Register of Historic Places in 1974.
