= Monterey, Mercer County, Ohio =

Unincorporated community in Ohio, U.S.

Coordinates: 40°27′02″N 84°47′02″W

Monterey is an unincorporated community in Mercer County, in the U.S. state of Ohio. The elevation of Monterey is 922 feet (281 m). Monterey appears on the Fort Recovery U.S. Geological Survey Map. Mercer County is in the Eastern Time Zone (UTC-5).

== History ==
Monterey was laid out in 1849.
