= Monterey, Nebraska =

Unincorporated community in Nebraska, U.S.

Coordinates: 41°47′34″N 96°48′18″W

Monterey is an unincorporated community in Cuming County, Nebraska, United States.

== History ==
A post office was established at Monterey in 1882, and remained in operation until it was discontinued in 1905. The town name commemorates the Battle of Monterrey in the Mexican–American War.
