= Monterey (Odessa, Delaware) =

Historic house in Delaware, US

- U.S. National Register of Historic Places
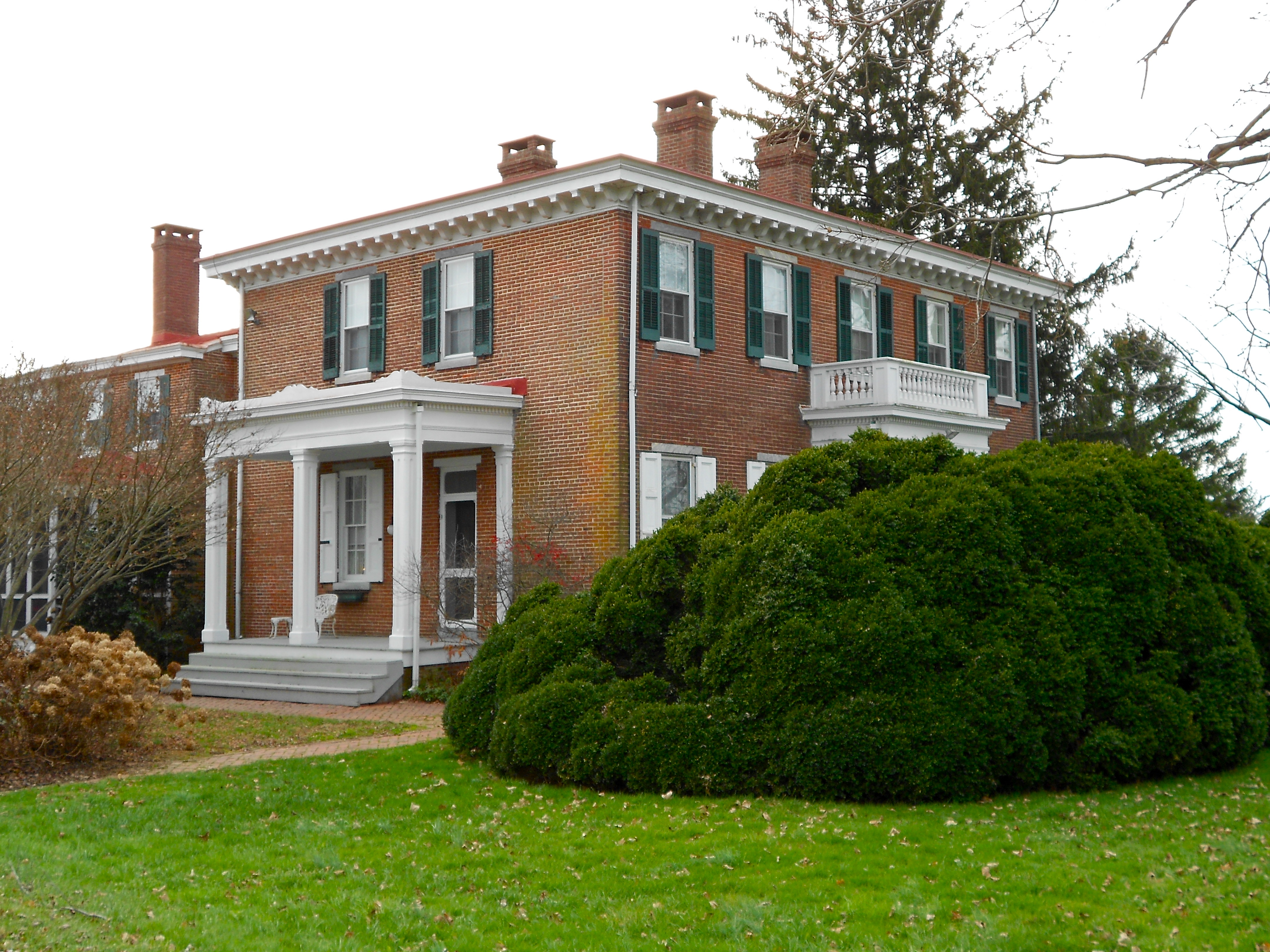
- Monterey, December 2011

- Location within Delaware Location within the United States
- Location: 692 Bayview Rd. in St. Georges Hundred, near Odessa, Delaware
- Coordinates: 39.490984°N 75.643601°W
- Area: 1 acre (0.40 ha)
- Built: 1850
- Architectural style: Georgian, Greek Revival, Peach Mansion
- NRHP reference No.: 80000933
- Added to NRHP: December 5, 1980

Monterey is a historic home located near Odessa in New Castle County, Delaware, United States. It was built about 1850, and is a two-story, five-bay brick house with an original ell to the rear and a frame, two-story addition to the extreme rear. It is of full Georgian plan - center hall, double pile and in the Greek Revival style. It has a one-bay entrance portico with a flat-roof and balustraded parapet. Also on the property are a contributing smokehouse, carriage house, ice house, granary, and frame octagonal privy.

It was listed on the National Register of Historic Places in 1980.
