= Luis Sotelo =

Spanish missionary

Blessed Luis Sotelo O.F.M.
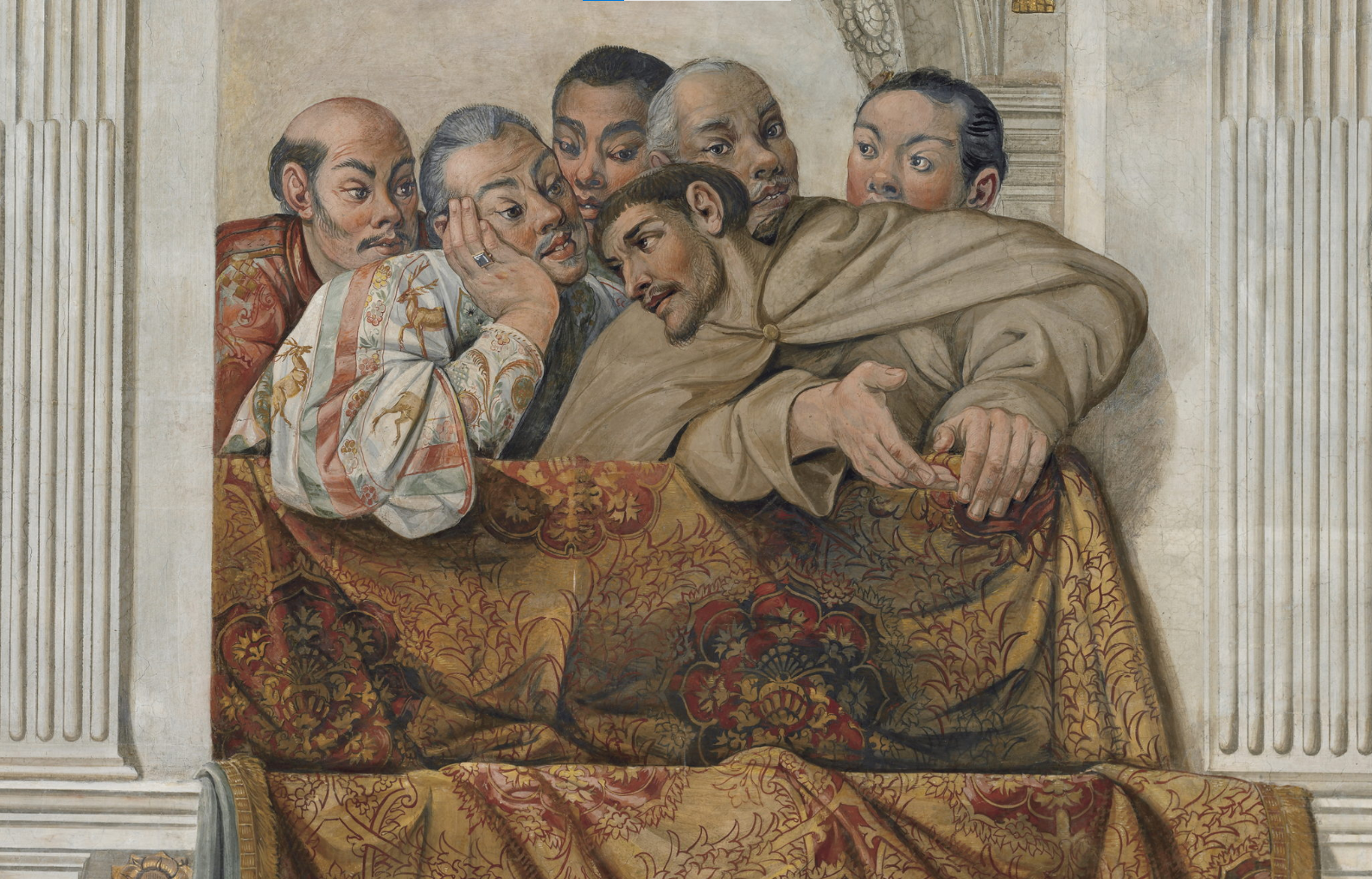
- Luis Sotelo, speaking with Hasekura Tsunenaga and other Japanese in Rome. Sala Regia, Quirinal Palace, Rome.
- Born: September 6, 1574; Seville, Andalusia, Spain
- Died: August 25, 1624 (aged 49); Ōmura, Nagasaki, Japan
- Venerated in: Roman Catholic Church
- Beatified: 7 July 1867 by Pope Pius IX
- Feast: 25 August

Luis Sotelo, OFM, in English known also as Louis Sotelo, (September 6, 1574 – August 25, 1624) was a Franciscan friar from Spain who died as a martyr in Japan, in 1624, and was beatified by Pope Pius IX in 1867.

== Early life ==
Luis was born to a noble family in Sevilla, Spain, and studied at the University of Salamanca before entering the convent of "Calvario de los Hermanos Menores". He became a Franciscan Friar and was ordained a priest. In 1600 he was sent to the Philippines to prepare for missionary work. There he was assigned to serve the spiritual needs of the Japanese settlement of Dilao, which was destroyed by Spanish forces, in 1608, after intense fighting.

In 1608, Pope Paul V authorized Dominicans and Franciscans to evangelize in Japan, heretofore the preserve of the Jesuits. Sotelo spent four years in Manila, learning the Japanese language before going to Japan and taking a leading role there.

== Proselytism in Edo ==
Sotelo tried to establish a Franciscan church in the area of Edo (present-day Tokyo). The church was destroyed in 1612, following the interdiction of Christianity in the territories of the Tokugawa shogunate on April 21, 1612. After a period of intense missionary activity by the Catholic Church, Tokugawa Hidetada, the second shōgun of the Tokugawa dynasty, issued a decree which banned the practice and teaching of the Christian faith, and under the threat of loss of life, all the missionaries had to leave Japan. This decree started the bloody persecution of Christians, which lasted several decades.

After the healing in Edo of a concubine of the powerful daimyō of Sendai, Date Masamune, Sotelo was invited to the northern part of Japan, in the area controlled by Date, under whom Christianity was still allowed. He came back to Tokyo the following year and constructed and inaugurated a new church on May 12, 1613, in the area of Asakusa Torigoe. The Bakufu reacted by arresting the Christians, and Sotelo himself was put in the Kodenma-chō (小伝馬町) prison. Seven fellow Japanese Christians, who had been arrested with Sotelo, were executed on July 1, but he was freed following a special request by Date Masamune.

== Embassy project ==
Sotelo, fluent in Japanese, planned and acted as translator on a Japanese embassy sent by Date Masamune to Spain on October 28, 1613. The embassy was headed by Hasekura Rokuemon Tsunenaga, and crossed the Pacific to Acapulco on board the Japanese-built (with assistance from European sailors) galleon San Juan Bautista. The embassy continued to Veracruz and Sanlucar de Barrameda, Seville, and Madrid. Sotelo had the Japanese receive baptism in Madrid, before accompanying them to see Pope Paul V in Rome.

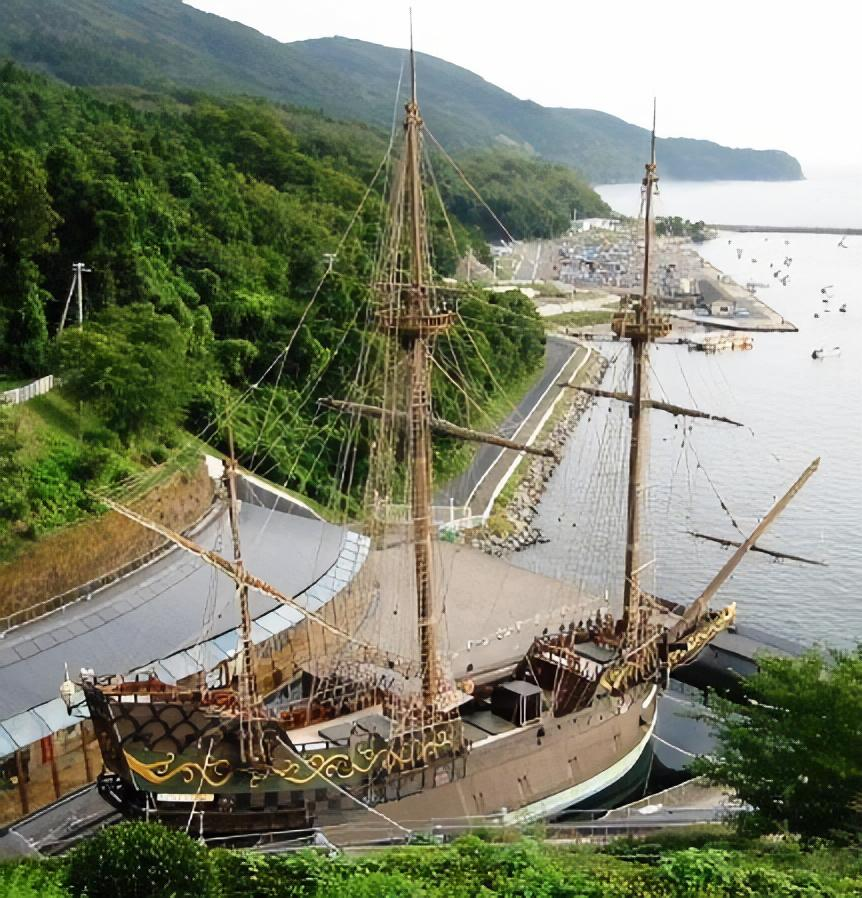
A replica of the Japanese-built 1613 galleon San Juan Bautista.

The embassy was a product of ambitions of Sotelo to increase the spread of the church in Japan and of Date Masamune to provide more priests to man the churches of his Christian subjects and to establish trade between Sendai and New Spain, and it had the approval of the shōgun, Tokugawa Ieyasu.

Sotelo remained for a full year in Madrid, along with the rest of the embassy. The return journey was delayed because Christianity was being harshly repressed in Japan, and because he was awaiting consecration as second Bishop of Japan. Pope Paul V had appointed him as such, pending the approval of the King of Spain, but, primarily because of rivalries between Franciscans and Jesuits, he was never consecrated. However, the Catholic Council of the Indies sent him back to Nueva España in 1618, to pursue his missionary activities there. Most of the Japanese samurai sent with the mission, who had converted to Christianity, remained at Coria del Río, near Seville, where their descendants live to this day.

Sotelo accompanied ambassador Hasekura and the remains of the embassy back to Veracruz and Acapulco, where the San Juan Bautista, requested by the outgoing Viceroy of the Philippines to convey him to the Philippines before returning to Sendai, diverted their course to Manila, arriving there in 1620.

The ambassadors' plan to return to Sendai from Manila was obstructed first by pirates and contrary winds. When Hasekura finally was able to return, the Spanish authorities impounded Sotelo in Manila, having no desire to stir up conflict with the Portuguese Jesuit mission in Macao by allowing a second, rival Franciscan bishop to be consecrated in Sendai, in addition to the existing Jesuit Bishop of Japan, previously ruling the diocese of Funai (Nagasaki). Date Masamune had wanted to trade with Nueva España (Mexico), but it soon became apparent that the policy of sakoku (the late-1613 closure of Japan to outside influences except for very carefully controlled trade through south-western ports), along with Spanish insistence that all trade to the East be channelled through the Philippines, would make this impossible.

== Return to Japan and Martyrdom ==
When Masamune Date sent a ship to collect him from the Philippines in order to bring him back to Sendai, the Spanish authorities forbade Sotelo to board it and would not allow him to make his own boat and sail there. He finally managed to enter Japan in 1622 and was turned over to the authorities by Chinese merchants when he was discovered on their ship. He was imprisoned for two years at Ōmura, north of Nagasaki, while the shōgun deliberated on his case. In the local prison, he joined Dominican Pedro Vásquez, Jesuit Miguel de Carvalho and two Japanese Franciscans, Ludovicus Sasada and tertiary Ludovicus Baba. Sotelo was burned at the stake in Ōmura, on 25 August 1624, at the age of 50, together with his religious companions.

He was beatified by Pope Pius IX on 7 July 1867. In the Roman Catholic Church, his feast day is celebrated on 25 August, as well as 10 September, the anniversary of the massacre of 205 Japanese martyrs.

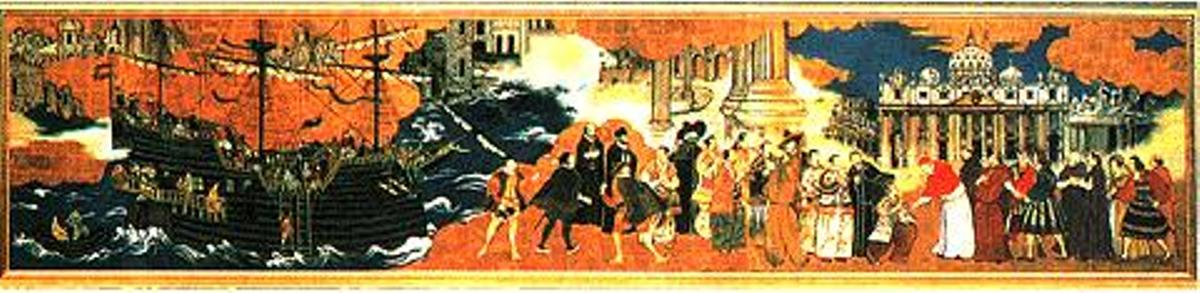
Hasekura's embassy to the Pope in Rome in 1617, accompanied by Luis Sotelo. Japanese painting, 17th century

== Sources ==
- The Christian century in Japan 1549-1650 C. R. Boxer ISBN 1-85754-035-2
- Histoire de la Religion Chrétienne au Japon depuis 1598 jusqu'a 1651... by Léon Pagès, 1869. Paris: Charles Douniol. (Annexe 3, pp. 137–161: letters in Latin of Luis Sotelo).
- Amati, Scipione, 1615. Historia del regno di Voxu del Giapone... Rome: G. Mascardi.
