= USS Monterey (1862) =

Tugboat of the United States Navy

History

United States
- Ordered: as Monitor
- Laid down: date unknown
- Launched: 1862
- Acquired: 20 April 1863
- In service: 18 May 1863
- Out of service: 1891
- Stricken: 7 October 1892
- Fate: Scrapped

General characteristics
- Displacement: 87 tons
- Length: 75 ft (23 m)
- Beam: 18 ft (5.5 m)
- Draft: 7 ft (2.1 m)
- Propulsion: steam engine; screw-propelled
- Speed: not known
- Complement: not known
- Armament: one 24-pounder gun; one 12-pounder gun

USS Monterey was a steamer purchased by the Union Navy during the American Civil War. She was used by the navy as a tugboat for several decades on the West Coast of the United States.

Monterey, a steam screw tug, was built as Monitor in 1862 by Eden Landing, San Francisco, California; purchased by the Navy from William Mighell 20 April 1863; renamed Monterey 18 May 1863: and placed in service the same day.

== Assigned to the Mare Island Navy Yard ==
The first tug permanently assigned to Mare Island Navy Yard, Monterey served the Navy at that base for nearly three decades, operating in and around Mare Island, California, and San Francisco Bay, towing ships and barges during the shipyard's years of development into one of America's largest shipbuilding centers.

== Decommissioned and scrapped after three decades of work ==
Her name was changed to Ivy 3 January 1891 and she was struck from the Naval Register 7 October 1892 and scrapped.
