= San Juan Bautista (ship) =

Japanese sailing ship

Coordinates: 38°24′32″N 141°22′08″E

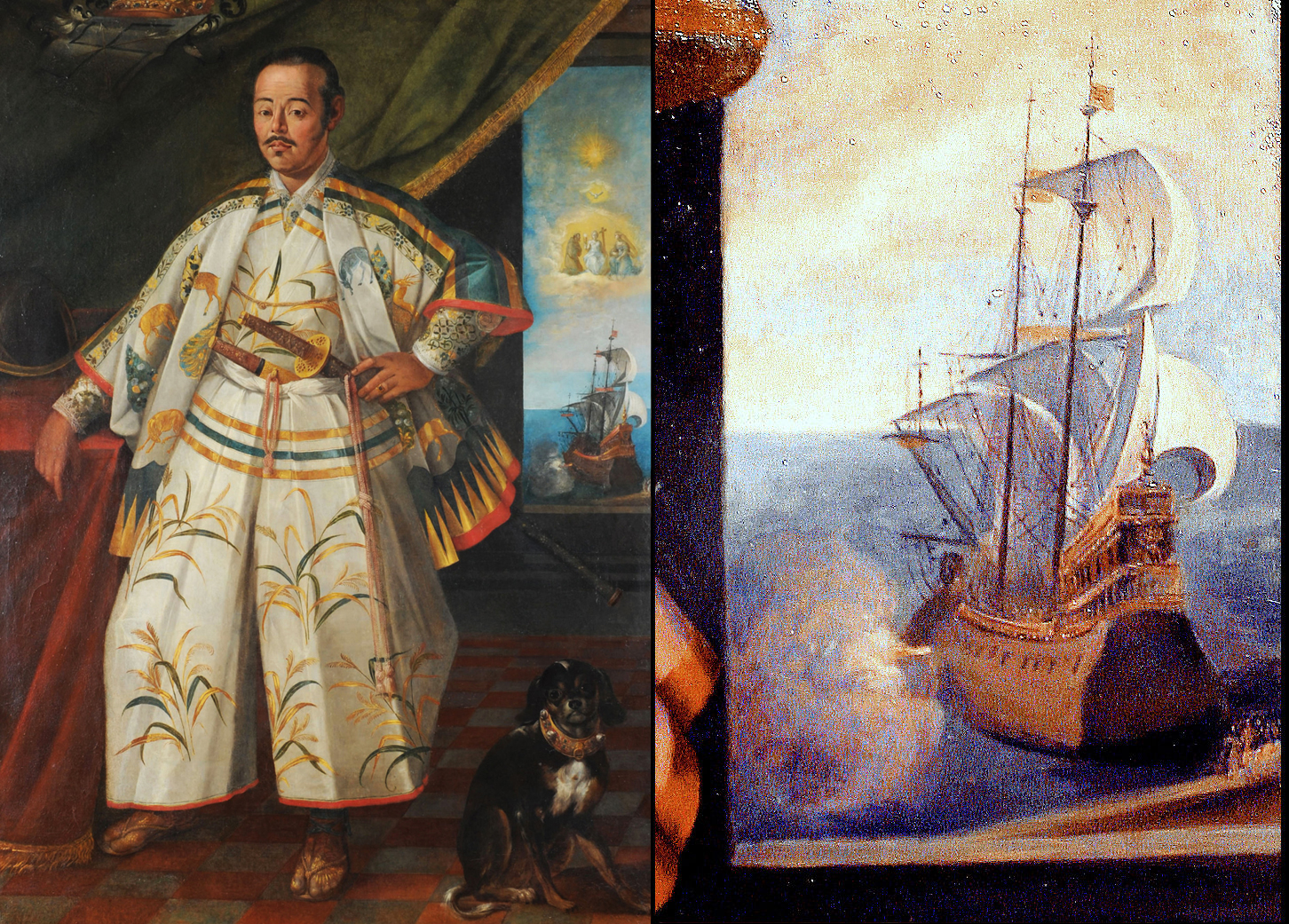
- The San Juan Bautista is represented in Claude Deruet's painting of Hasekura Tsunenaga in Rome in 1617, as a galleon with Hasekura's flag (red swastika on orange background) on the topmast.

History
- Name: San Juan Bautista
- Builder: Date Masamune
- Laid down: 1613
- Launched: 1613
- Commissioned: September 1613
- Fate: Sunk in 1619

General characteristics
- Displacement: 500 long tons (508 t)
- Length: 55.35 m (181 ft 7 in) o/a
- Beam: 11.25 m (36 ft 11 in)
- Draught: 3.8 m (12 ft 6 in)
- Propulsion: 3-masted sailboat
- Complement: 180
- Armament: 16 cannons

San Juan Bautista ("St. John the Baptist") was one of Japan's first Japanese-built Western-style sailing ships. She crossed the Pacific in 1614. She was of the Spanish galleon type, known in Japan as nanban-sen (南蛮船, "Southern Barbarian ships").

She transported a Japanese diplomatic mission of 180 people during the first leg of their trip to the Vatican as envoys to Pope Paul V, headed by Hasekura Tsunenaga and accompanied by the Spanish friar Luis Sotelo. After transporting Hasekura to Acapulco in the Spanish possession of New Spain, the ship returned to Japan. Hasekura and the embassy went on to Europe, eventually reaching Rome.

== Construction ==
San Juan Bautista was built in 1613 by Date Masamune, the daimyō of Sendai in northern Japan, in Tsuki-No-Ura harbour (Ishinomaki, Miyagi Prefecture). The project had been approved by the Bakufu, the shōgun's government in Edo.

The shōgun already had two smaller ships (80 and 120 tons) built for him by the English pilot William Adams. The larger, the San Buena Ventura, was given to Spanish shipwrecked sailors to return to New Spain in 1610. The shōgun also issued numerous permits for Red seal ships, destined for Asian trade and incorporating many elements of Western ship design.

San Juan Bautista is reported to have required 45 days' work, with the participation of technical experts from the Bakufu, 800 shipwrights, 700 smiths, and 3000 carpenters. Two Spanish men also participated to the endeavour: the friar Luis Sotelo, and the Spanish captain Sebastián Vizcaíno.

These efforts were seen with disapproval by the Spanish government in Manila, and Los Rios Coronel suggested that Luis Sotelo should not be allowed into Japan any further (C. R. Boxer).

== Two trans-Pacific round-trips ==
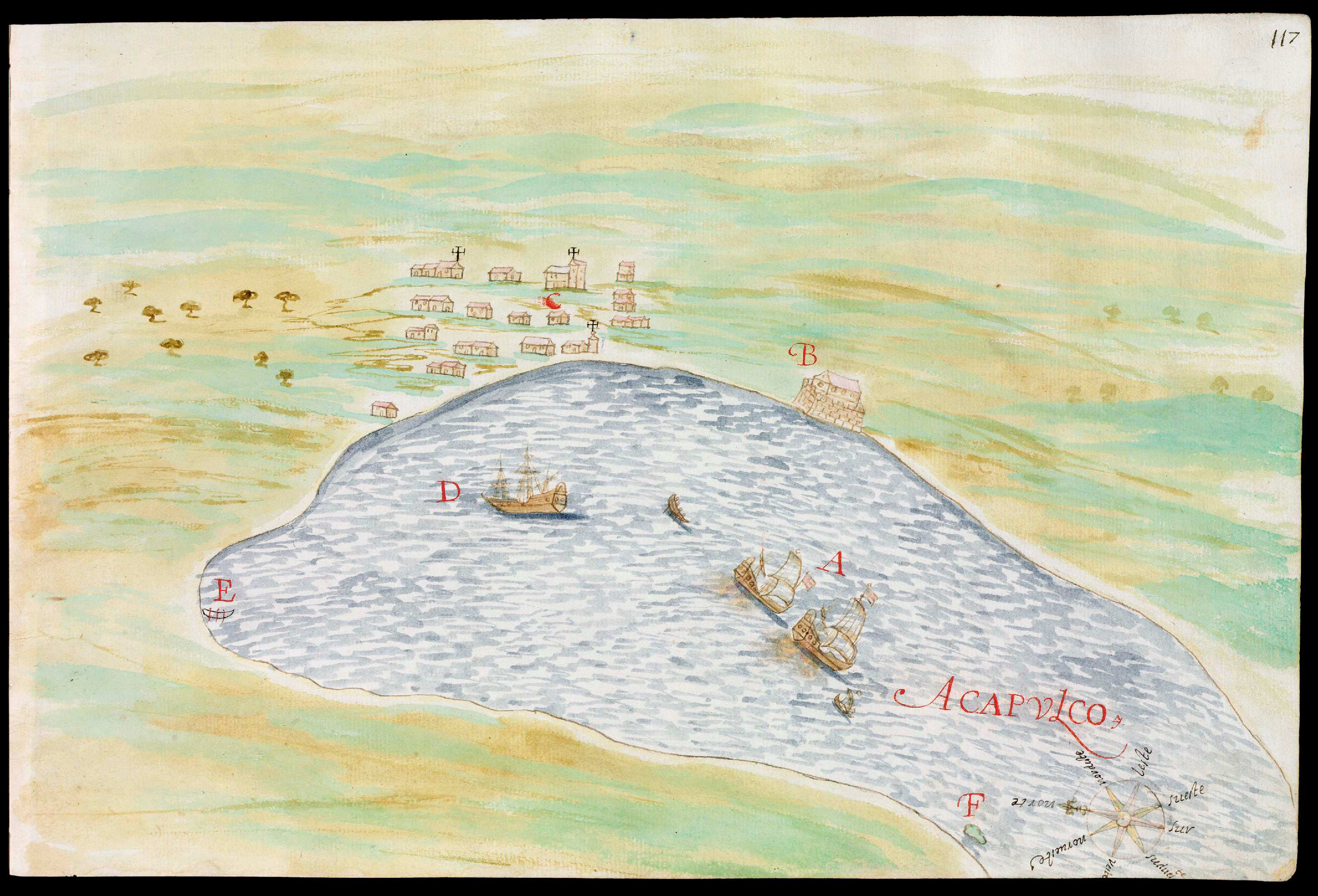
Nicolás de Cardona, in his 1632 report submitted to the king of Spain, included a view of the bay and city of Acapulco, mentioning the presence of "a ship from Japan" (letter "D"), probably the San Juan Bautista (Gonoi, p53). Cardona was in Acapulco between the end of 1614 and March 21, 1615. The full legend reads: A. The ships of the expedition. B. The castle of San Diego. C. The town. D. A ship that has come from Japan. E. Los Manzanillos. F. El Grifo.

Upon completion, the ship left on October 28, 1613, for Acapulco in New Spain, with around 180 people on board, consisting of 10 samurai of the shōgun (led by the Minister of the Navy Mukai Shōgen Tadakatsu), 12 samurai from Sendai, 120 Japanese merchants, sailors, and servants, and around 40 Spaniards and Portuguese. The ship arrived in Acapulco on January 25, 1614, after three months at sea.

After a year in Acapulco, the ship returned to Japan on April 28, 1615, as Hasekura continued to Europe. It seems that around 50 specialists in mining and silver-refining were invited to Japan on this occasion, so that they could help develop the mining industry in the Sendai area. A group of Franciscans led by Father Diego de Santa Catalina, sent as a religious embassy to Tokugawa Ieyasu also sailed on the ship. The San Juan Bautista arrived in Uraga, Japan on August 15, 1615.

In September 1616 the San Juan Bautista headed again to Acapulco, at the request of Luis Sotelo. She was sailed by Captain Yokozawa Shōgen, but the trip went wrong and around 100 sailors died en route. San Juan Bautista finally arrived in Acapulco in May 1617. Sotelo and Hasekura met in Mexico for the return trip back to Japan. In April 1618 the ship arrived in the Philippines, where she was sold to the Spanish government there with the objective of building up defenses against the Dutch. Hasekura returned to Japan in 1620.

During his absence Japan had changed quite drastically: Christianity was being eradicated, and Japan was moving towards a period of seclusion. Because of these persecutions, the trade agreements with New Spain he had been trying to establish were also denied. In the end, his efforts seem to have had few results, and he died two years later of illness.

The ship ended up in the ownership of Diego Sarmiento de Acuña, 1st Count of Gondomar.

== First Africans in Virginia ==
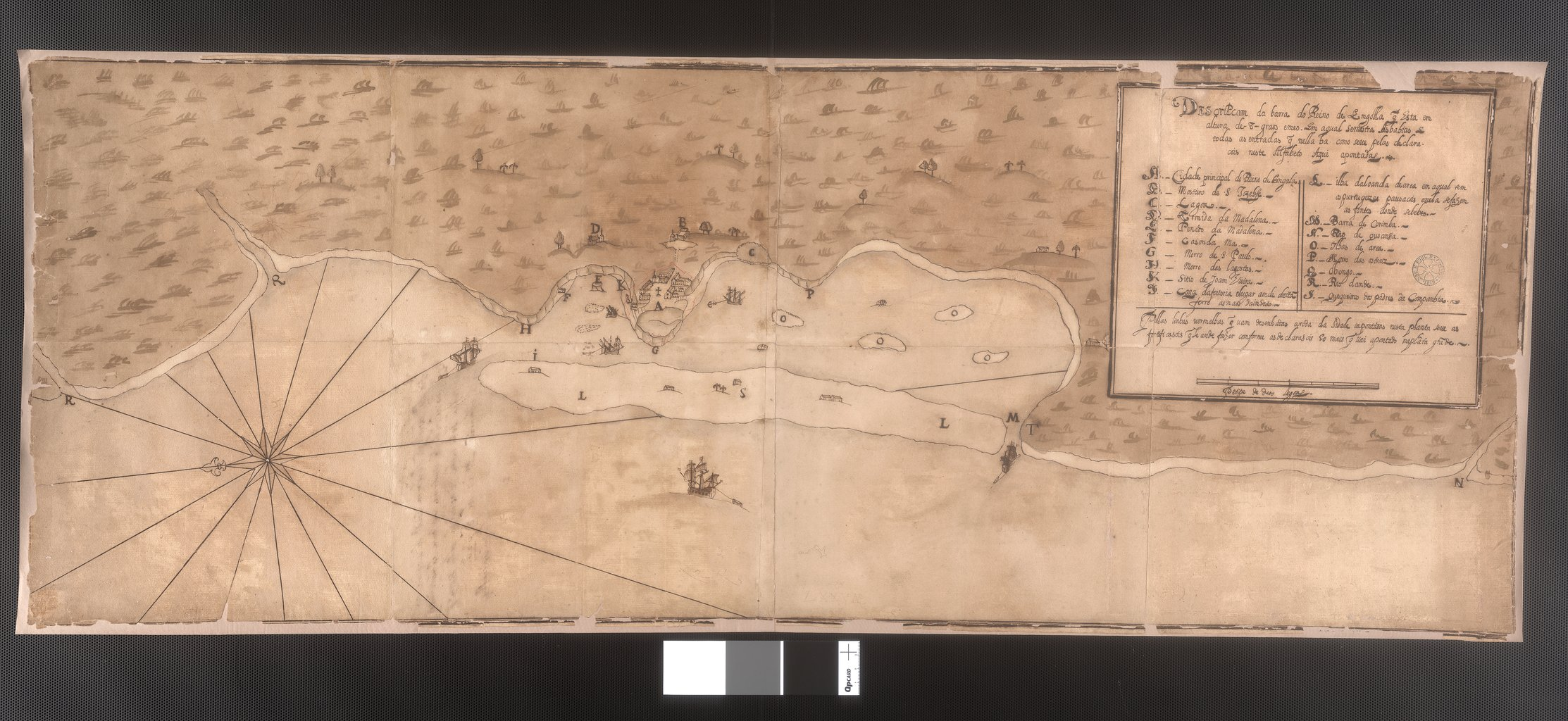
Port of Luanda, 1626.

By May 1619, the San Juan Bautista was in the Port of Luanda loading 350 African slaves for transport. The captain, a relative of de Acuña, sailed the Africans to Jamaica, during which time over one hundred of them died of illness. He traded twenty-four of them and set sail for Veracruz, but was attacked by two English ships, the White Lion and Treasurer. The captain surrendered, and the English ships split sixty of the Africans between them. The incident was described as follows:

Enter on the credit side the receipt of 8,657.875 pesos paid by Manuel Mendes de Acuna, master of the ship San Juan Bautista, on 147 slave pieces brought by him into the said port on August 30, 1619, aboard the frigate Santa Ana, master Rodrigo Escobar. On the voyage inbound, Manuel Mendes de Acuna was robbed at sea off the coast of Campeche by English corsairs. Out of 350 slaves, large and small, he loaded in said Luanda the English corsairs left him with only 147, including 24 slave boys he was forced to sell in Jamaica, where he had to refresh, for he had many sick aboard, and many had already died.

=== Sinking and aftermath ===
Due to the damage inflicted during the attack, the San Juan Bautista sank in the Bay of Campeche. The Africans left behind with the captain were transported to Veracruz by a frigate, and sold as slaves to work in the New Mexico silver mines. The Africans taken by the Treasurer and White Lion were transported to Point Comfort, and became the First Africans in Virginia.

== 1993 replica ship ==
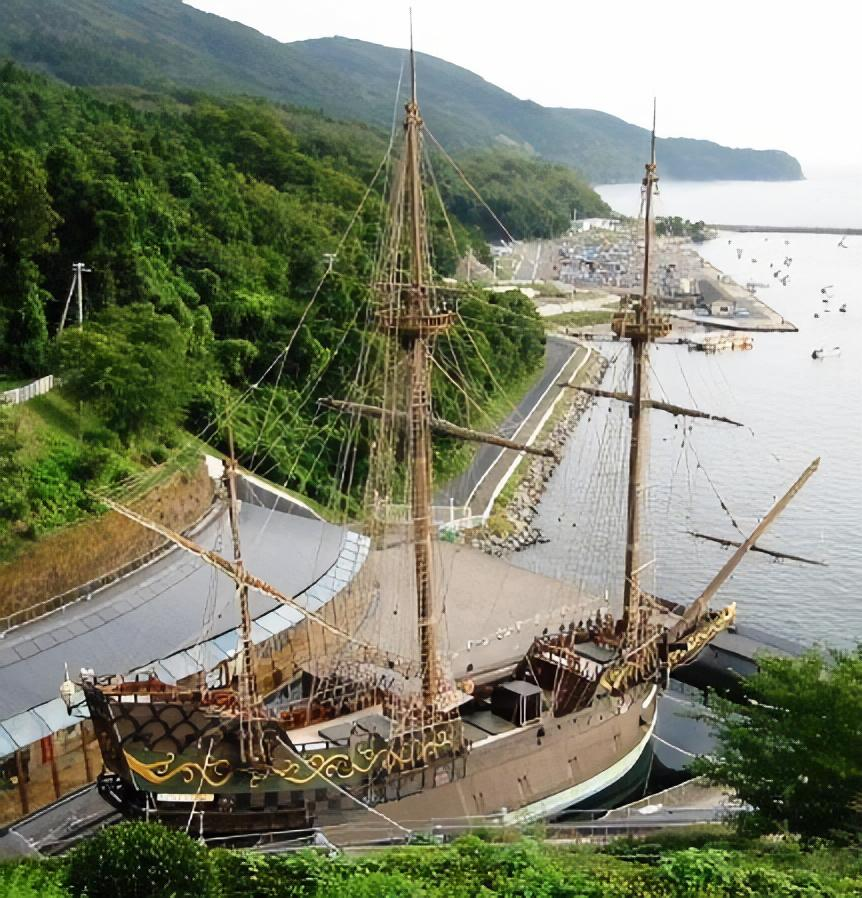
Replica of the San Juan Bautista, in Ishinomaki, Japan. (2002)

A replica of the San Juan Bautista was reconstructed in 1993 on the basis of the records of the House of Date. Although its blueprints have not been found, the ship's dimensions were recorded properly, permitting a speculative reconstitution. The ship was put on display in the Miyagi Sant Juan Bautista Museum in Ishinomaki, in northern Japan, close to the location where she was originally built. The replica survived the 2011 Tōhoku earthquake and tsunami with some damage, and there were hopes in 2011 of using the ship as a symbol of the town's reconstruction.

In November 2013 the repaired San Juan Bautista was rededicated. Assistance had come from Western Forest Products, a British Columbia lumber company, who supplied the massive Douglas fir and cedar logs to create masts that had been damaged in the tsunami. However, the replica ship was deemed to be unsafe to the public due to structural damage from floodwater and other factors, and the Miyagi prefectural government decided to demolish the ship rather than to continue repairing it. Dismantling began in November 2021. The government built a new ship in its place, using fibre-reinforced plastic and reducing the size to one quarter of the original. The new, smaller ship was revealed to the public in October 2024.

== See also ==
- Manila galleon
- List of ships of the Imperial Japanese Navy
- Red seal ships
