= SS Monterey (1897) =

Coordinates: 46°49′N 56°24′W

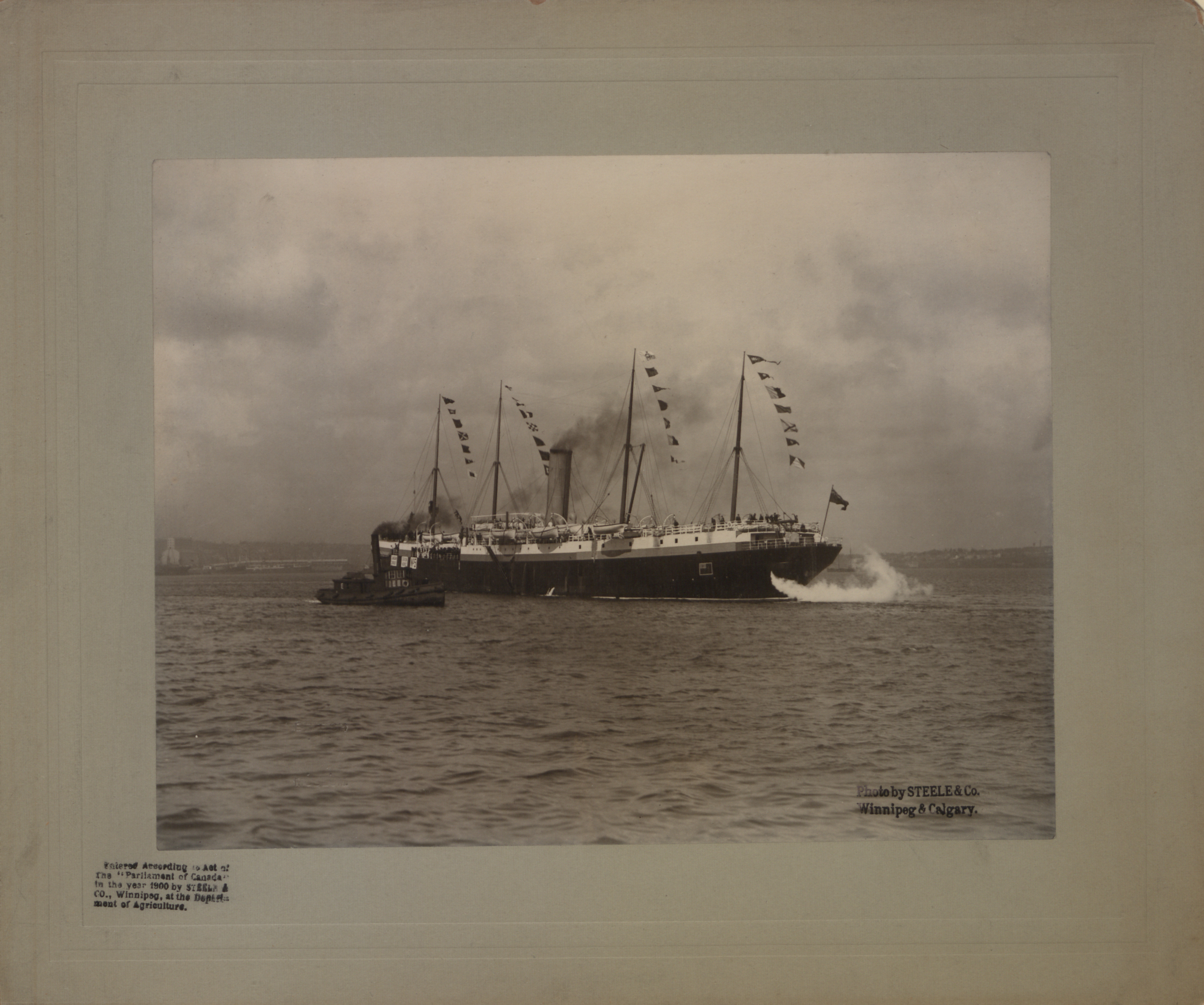
- Monterey leaving Halifax with Strathcona's Horse on March 17, 1900

History

United Kingdom
- Name: Monterey
- Owner: Elder, Dempster & Co. (1898); Elder, Dempster Shipping (1899-1903); Canadian Pacific (1903)
- Builder: Palmer’s Ship Building & Iron Co, Jarrow
- Yard number: 728
- Launched: 25 November 1897
- Sponsored by: Miss Alyce Wilson
- Commissioned: 25 May 1898
- Home port: Liverpool
- Identification: UK Official Number 109427; Call sign QDBV
- Fate: Wrecked, 14 July 1903

General characteristics
- Type: Cargo ship
- Tonnage: 5,455 GRT; 3,489 NRT; 8,185 DWT
- Length: 445 ft 0 in (135.64 m)
- Beam: 52 ft 2 in (15.90 m)
- Depth: 27 ft 8 in (8.43 m)
- Installed power: 661 Nhp
- Propulsion: Palmer’s Ship Building & Iron Co 3-cylinder triple expansion
- Speed: 12.5 knots (14.4 mph; 23.2 km/h)

Monterey was a cargo schooner-rigged steamer built in 1897 by the Palmer's Ship Building & Iron Co of Jarrow for Elder, Dempster & Co. of Liverpool to serve on their cross-Atlantic routes.

== Design and construction ==
In mid-1890s Elder, Dempster & Co. placed an order for six vessels of approximate 8,000 deadweight to run on their Dominion Line between Canadian ports of Montreal and Quebec and Bristol. Monterey was the second ship of the series and was laid down at Palmer's Ship Building & Iron Co. shipyard in Jarrow and launched on 25 November 1897 (yard number 728), with Miss Alyse Wilson of Newcastle, daughter of Mr. J. P. Wilson, being the sponsor.

After successful completion of sea trials on May 25, 1898, during which the ship attained maximum speed over 13 1/4 knots (15.2 mph; 24.5 km/h), she was transferred to her owners and immediately departed for Montreal at 17:00 local time. The vessel was constructed for general cargo trade, and had an iron shelter deck for cattle built over the whole length of the ship. She also had all the modern machinery fitted for quick loading and unloading of the cargo. In addition, the ship was fitted with refrigerating machinery and insulated chambers to carry dairy produce and chilled meat.

As built, the ship was 445 feet 0 inches (135.64 m) long (between perpendiculars) and 52 feet 2 inches (15.90 m) abeam, a mean draft of 27 feet 6 inches (8.38 m). Monterey was assessed at 5,455 GRT and 3,489 NRT and had deadweight of approximately 8,185. The vessel had a steel hull, and a single 661 nhp triple-expansion steam engine, with cylinders of 30-inch (76 cm), 50-inch (130 cm) and 81 1/2-inch (207 cm) diameter with a 54-inch (140 cm) stroke, that drove a single screw propeller, and moved the ship at up to 12.5 knots (14.4 mph; 23.2 km/h).

== Operational history ==
Upon delivery Monterey departed Liverpool for Montreal in ballast on May 25, 1898 and arrived at her destination on June 5. After spending four days in port she left Montreal on June 9 with 8,400 tons of general cargo composed of large quantities of corn, wheat, flour and other foodstuffs in addition to 490 heads of cattle and 68 horses. She reached Bristol on June 20, thus completing her maiden voyage.

The vessel immediately departed for her second voyage from Bristol and arrived at Montreal on July 3. After loading her cargo, she sailed back four days later and arrived at Bristol on July 17. Monterey continued her service through the end of summer navigational season, arriving from Montreal at Bristol on November 23 with her usual cargo. After unloading she left Bristol for New Orleans on November 30, 1898 and anchored there on December 16. There she loaded 17,065 bales of cotton, 500 tons of pig iron and a few other things and departed for Bremen on January 1, 1899 and arrived at Bremen on January 19.

She left Newcastle for her next trip on February 1, 1899 but had to call at St. Michael's on February 11 with two broken propeller blades and after finishing her repairs, was able to proceed three days later, reaching Galveston on March 2. After loading her cargo, consisting among other things of 13,325 bales of cotton and 2,400 tons oilcake, she departed on March 28 for Liverpool via Norfolk. On April 8, 1899 it was announced that Elder, Dempster & Co. decided to run their vessels on Canadian routes under Beaver Line flag, creating a rival line to the original Beaver Line run by D. & C. MacIver. Furthermore, a new company, Elder, Dempster Shipping was formed and registered on May 3 to acquire seventeen steamers managed by the Elder, Dempster & Co. as well as coal and stores for £1,100,000. Following the transfer, Monterey departed Barry on May 18 and arrived at Montreal on May 30 to resume her summer trade.

On July 26, 1899 Monterey inaugurated new mail service between Queenstown and Canada when she loaded 144 mail sacks and 26 large packages from a mail train.

On October 1, 1899 she arrived at Queenstown and landed six passengers, chief engineer, twenty one crew and four stowaways from the Scotsman which wrecked at Belle Isle September 21.

Following the closure of summer navigation on St. Lawrence River, Monterey was reassigned to the Beaver Line and commenced carrying mails and cargo between the ports of Liverpool and Halifax starting on November 18.

=== In the Imperial Government Service ===
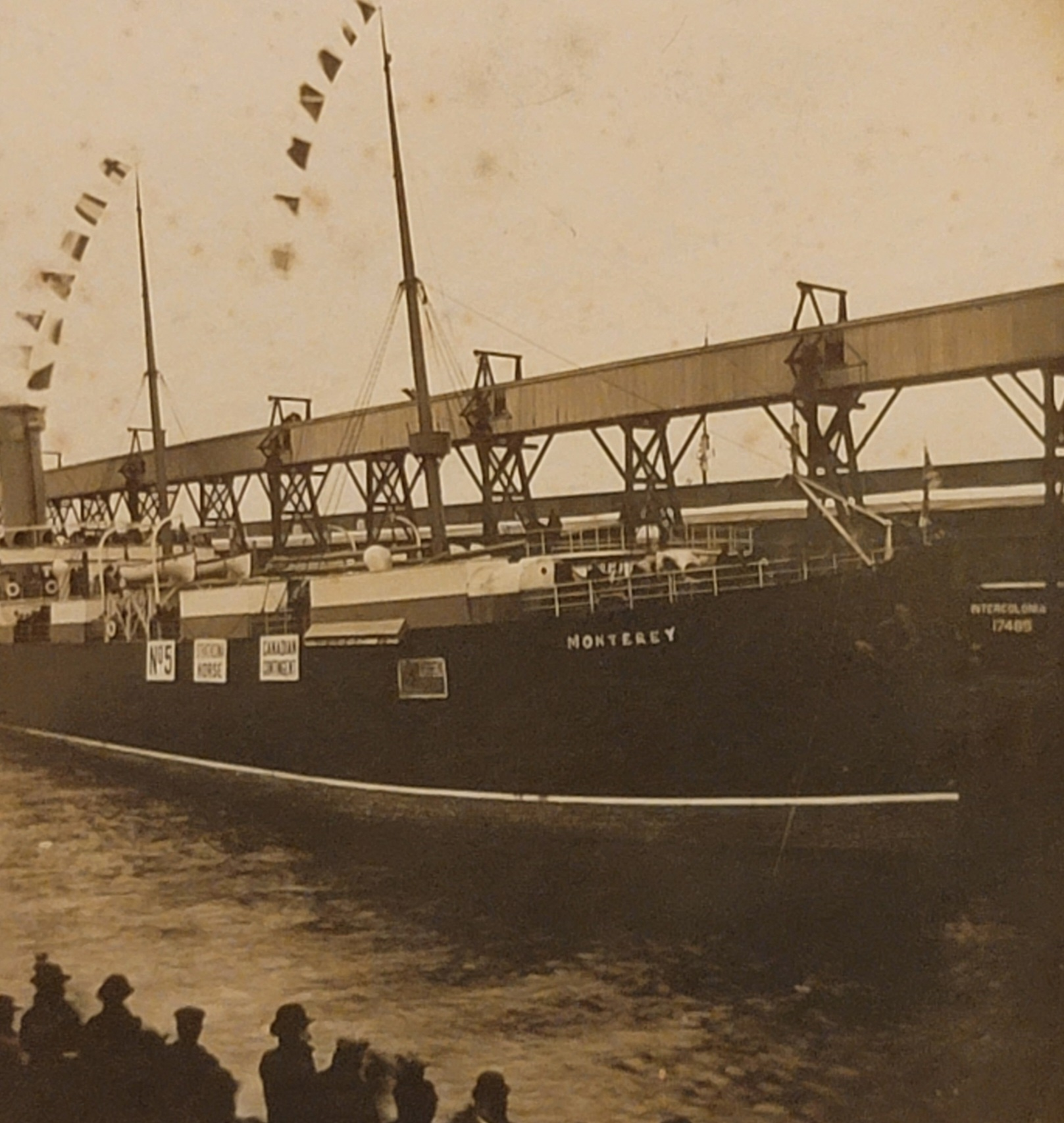
at Halifax loaded with Canadian soldiers bound for South Africa to serve in the Boer War

On January 31, 1900 it was reported that Monterey was chartered along with several other vessels to transport Lord Strathcona's Canadian contingent to South Africa to reinforce the British forces during the Second Boer War. The steamer arrived at Halifax at 03:30 on February 27, 1900, loaded the Strathcona's Horse regiment consisting of 552 officers and men, 599 horses and ammunition on March 16. She additionally took onboard 203 replacement men for the first Canadian regiment and left Halifax the next morning at 11:00 local time. The voyage was fine and uneventful with the exception of horses contracting pneumonia with 163 of them dying en route. The ship reached Cape Town on April 11 and disembarked the troops and unloaded her cargo and sailed back to North America. Due to Monterey having a dedicated cattle deck, she was chartered for the duration of the war to transport mules and horses to South Africa.

While in the government service she still managed to make occasional commercial trips. For example, on November 10, 1900 she left New Orleans for Havre and London via Norfolk carrying a large cargo of lumber, 40,000 bushels of wheat and 10,050 bales of cotton. On her return trip she transported 4,500 tons of coal from Barry for New Orleans.

During her return trip from South Africa in June 1901, fire was discovered in the afterhold a few days after leaving St. Vincent. All the conventional ways of extinguishing fire proved to be unsuccessful, and it took unusual means to bring it under control. The vessel arrived at New Orleans badly damaged on June 25. She entered the drydock for repairs at Newport News after arriving there on September 23 from South Africa. While at the mooring, her cargo of baled hay in the forward No. 1 hold was set on fire on September 26, and it took several hours for both the shipyard and city fire departments to extinguish it. Several deck plates and beams buckled due to fire and had to be replaced. Monterey delivered her last cargo of remounts after the war had ended and was released from her charter. She sailed from South Africa to Montreal and arrived there on July 23, 1902 to resume her regular service.

Remounts from North America carried by Monterey to South Africa in 1900-1902
Date of departure	Port of departure	Date of arrival	Port of arrival	No. of remounts embarked	Other cargo
23 May 1900	New Orleans	21 June 1900	Port Elizabeth	1,158 horses	220 tons hay, 53 tons bran, 3,750 bushels oats
8 August 1900	New Orleans	15 September 1900	Durban	1,168 horses	201 tons hay, 67 tons bran, 4,500 bushels oats
27 January 1901	New Orleans	24 February 1901	Durban	1,000 horses	220 tons hay, 90 tons bran, 5,626 bushels oats
17 April 1901	New Orleans	16 May 1901	Durban	1,096 mules	245 tons hay, 40 tons bran, 2,500 bushels oats
4 July 1901	New Orleans	5 August 1901	Durban	520 mules/500 horses	280 tons hay, 100 tons bran, 4,687 bushels oats, 1,070 halters
18 October 1901	New Orleans	26 November 1901	East London	1,078 mules	256 tons hay, 40 tons bran, 3,687 bushels oats, 714 bushels corn, 1,100 halters
18 January 1902	New Orleans	20 February 1902	East London	1,000 horses	235 tons hay, 54 tons bran, 6,300 bushels oats, 1,085 bushels corn, 1,050 halters
19 May 1902	New Orleans	15 June 1902	East London	500 horses/500 mules	248 tons hay, 45 tons bran, 5,950 bushels oats, 1,050 halters

=== Return to Commercial Service ===
Upon arrival in Montreal Monterey took on board her own cargo and the cargo that was supposed to be carried by steamer SS Monteagle. She loaded 350 heads of cattle, 8,253 boxes of butter and 41,893 boxes of cheese among other things and left for Bristol on July 27. She continued sailing between Montreal and Bristol until the end of the navigational season, leaving Montreal for the last time on November 28. During the 1902-1903 winter season the steamer was supposed to continue operating between Bristol and St. John's, however, Monterey did not sail until January 8, 1903 departing Barry with a cargo of 5,500 tons of coal for Philadelphia. From there the vessel sailed to St. Jonh's and next sailed to London on February 15. At about this time Canadian Pacific Railway was finalizing their negotiations with Elder, Dempster Shipping about acquiring several of their steamers to complete their cross-Atlantic, United Kingdom to Canada, service. On February 24, 1903 it was announced that Canadian Pacific Railway acquired 14 steamers from Elder, Dempster Shipping serving mostly on Beaver and Elder Lines for £1,417,500 (Monterey was bought for £75,640).

Monterey left for her first voyage under new ownership on April 15, 1903 from Bristol carrying general cargo, and arrived at Montreal on April 27. She loaded 1,058 heads of cattle and general cargo and departed on May 19 for Bristol and Liverpool.

=== Sinking ===
Monterey left Bristol for her final voyage on June 24, 1903 and reached Montreal on July 5. After unloading, she took on board her usual cargo, consisting of 1,043 heads of cattle, 88,115 bushels of wheat, large quantities of cheese, butter, flour, lumber etc. and departed at 06:30 on July 11 bound for Bristol and Liverpool. She was under command of captain Robert O. Williams and had a crew of 68 men, 43 cattlemen and had one passenger on board. After dropping off her pilot at Father's Point at around 07:25 on July 12, she continued her trip down the St. Lawrence River. In the morning of July 13, the captain calculated the ship position by dead reckoning to be about 65 nm northwest of Cape Ray. By early afternoon it became foggy and he ordered to change course to a more southerly one. At 19:10 the ship was about 29 miles south of Cape Ray. Bearing was again taken at this point, and the course was again adjusted to a more easterly one, so according to the captain's estimate the ship would clear the Plate Point by about 11 nm. The ship continued following the set course and at about 22:00 the fog dissipated. At 03:45 on July 14 a large fog bank was spotted straight ahead, but captain Williams estimated the visibility to be about 5 miles. The depth was measured and it came out to be 60 fathoms.

At about 04:30 a thick fog rolled in and the second mate alerted the captain to this fact. Captain Williams came on deck and ordered the engines to stand by. Monterey was making about 12 knots at the time. At about 04:50 the second mate suddenly spotted breakers ahead and ordered the engines reversed but it was too late, as the ship went aground on the rocks about a quarter mile south of Plate Point lighthouse on the island of Petite Miquelon and got stuck. The ship was examined and it was determined she was leaking in the first and second ballast tanks, which contained fresh water for the livestock on board, and the No. 1 hold. On July 15 an attempt was made to refloat the ship in high water under her own power, but it failed. The engine room was flooded soon, with water reaching as high as 18 feet at high tide, and the fires were extinguished. The crew started unloading cargo in an attempt to save it, especially the livestock. Some of the cattle was taken aboard by two small steamers, SS Argyle and SS Grand Lake, that came by, but the rest had to be lowered from the steamer on to the ground. Most of the livestock was successfully transferred to the mainland by July 18, however, about 200 to 300 heads climbed the hills and escaped into the wild, wandering around the island for several months after the disaster.

Due to the fact that the ship was badly damaged at the bottom, she was quickly abandoned and the salvage operation instead concentrated on stripping off as much valuable equipment as possible from the steamer.

An inquiry was held into the wreck on November 28, 1903 and as a result captain Williams had his certificate suspended for six month for failure to verify the position of the ship, and continuing at full speed in thick fog. Aside from that, the cause of the disaster was also attributed to the strong undercurrent present around the island of Miquelon, that captain Williams was unaware of at the time of the incident, that carried the vessel too far north off her course. The court also addressed an issue with a non-functioning fog siren at the lighthouse and made recommendations for the future. In fact, the siren was only heard for the first time at around 07:00 on July 14, two hours after the ship stranded, and the gun was not fired until 05:15.
