= Monterey Township, Michigan =

- Township
- Location within the state of Michigan
- Coordinates: 42°38′4″N 85°49′49″W
- Country: United States
- State: Michigan
- County: Allegan

Area
  - Total: 36.0 sq mi (93.2 km^{2})
  - Land: 35.7 sq mi (92.5 km^{2})
  - Water: 0.27 sq mi (0.7 km^{2})
- Elevation: 896 ft (273 m)

Population (2020)
  - Total: 2,436
  - Density: 68.2/sq mi (26.34/km^{2})
- Time zone: UTC-5 (Eastern (EST))
  - Summer (DST): UTC-4 (EDT)
- ZIP code: 49010, 49328, 49419
- Area code: 269
- FIPS code: 26-55200
- GNIS feature ID: 1626760
- Website: https://montereytownship.org

Monterey Township is a civil township of Allegan County in the U.S. state of Michigan. The population was 2,436 at the 2020 census.

== Geography ==
According to the United States Census Bureau, the township has a total area of 36.0 square miles (93.2 km^{2}), of which 35.7 square miles (92.5 km^{2}) is land and 0.27 square miles (0.7 km^{2}), or 0.79%, is water.

== Demographics ==
Historical population
Census	Pop.	Note	%±
1960	1,146		—
1970	1,148		0.2%
1980	1,320		15.0%
1990	1,534		16.2%
2000	2,073		35.1%
2010	2,345		13.1%
2020	2,436		3.9%
Source: Census Bureau. Census 1960- 2000, 2010.

As of the census of 2000, there were 2,065 people, 707 households, and 559 families residing in the township. The population density was 57.8 inhabitants per square mile (22.3/km^{2}). There were 760 housing units at an average density of 21.3 per square mile (8.2/km^{2}). The racial makeup of the township was 95.30% White, 0.53% African American, 1.50% Native American, 0.19% Asian, 0.92% from other races, and 1.55% from two or more races. Hispanic or Latino of any race were 1.60% of the population.

There were 707 households, out of which 43.4% had children under the age of 18 living with them, 66.2% were married couples living together, 7.9% had a female householder with no husband present, and 20.9% were non-families. 16.7% of all households were made up of individuals, and 6.2% had someone living alone who was 65 years of age or older. The average household size was 2.92 and the average family size was 3.28.

In the township the population was spread out, with 31.7% under the age of 18, 7.7% from 18 to 24, 34.8% from 25 to 44, 18.5% from 45 to 64, and 7.3% who were 65 years of age or older. The median age was 33 years. For every 100 females, there were 109.0 males. For every 100 females age 18 and over, there were 105.8 males.

The median income for a household in the township was $48,750, and the median income for a family was $54,286. Males had a median income of $34,792 versus $24,964 for females. The per capita income for the township was $18,718. About 2.2% of families and 4.8% of the population were below the poverty line, including 5.8% of those under age 18 and 5.6% of those age 65 or over.
