= SS Haiti =

History
- Name: Haiti (1932–1938); Puerto Rico (1938–1939); Monterey (1939–1948); Adana (1948–1968)
- Port of registry: New York
- Builder: Newport News Shipbuilding
- Cost: $2,343,162.07
- Laid down: 4 April 1932
- Launched: 17 September 1932
- Completed: 15 December 1932
- Identification: Official Number 232021
- Fate: Sold for scrap, 1968

General characteristics
- Tonnage: 5,236 GRT
- Length: 385 ft 5 in (117.5 m)
- Beam: 57 ft 6 in (17.5 m)
- Draft: 23 ft 8 in (7.2 m)
- Decks: 3
- Propulsion: steam turbine
- Speed: 16 knots
- Capacity: 134 first and 24 tourist class passengers; Cargo: 205,578 cubic feet; as built: 213,000 cubic feet
- Crew: 95

SS Haiti was a passenger and freight ship built for the Colombian Mail Steamship Company built at Newport News Shipbuilding, Newport News, Virginia and delivered 15 December 1932. The ship was renamed briefly Puerto Rico in 1938 and Monterey in 1939 to operate for the New York and Cuba Mail Steamship Company until requisitioned with transfer of title to the War Shipping Administration (WSA) on 25 September 1942. The ship was then allocated to the U.S. Army for operation under a bareboat agreement as USAT Monterey. In 1943 the ship was assigned to the command at Trinidad to supply bases in Brazil and Ascension Island. After layup in the reserve fleet the ship was sold to Turkey.

== Construction and design ==
Haiti's keel was laid 4 April 1932 at Newport News Shipbuilding with launch on 17 September and delivery on 15 December, less than a month after delivery of her sister ship Colombia on 17 November 1932. The ships were designed by Theodore E. Ferris, the noted naval architect and marine engineer for the Emergency Fleet Corporation/United States Shipping Board responsible for that organization's designs. Construction of both Haiti and Colombia was financed by the United States Shipping Board's Bureau of Construction and Finance with a loan of $1,687,500 for each ship with the total cost of Haiti being $2,343,162.07.

=== Cargo and engineering ===
The ship was designed for a normal speed of 16 knots, (Note: Cited Pacific Marine Review article notes Colombia sea trials in which the ship achieved an average speed of just under 18.5 knots at 8,275 shaft horsepower over a course of 67.5 nautical miles.) having refrigerated cargo capacity of 58,500 cubic feet (1,660 m^{3}), ventilated cargo capacity of 67,500 cubic feet (1,910 m^{3}) and general cargo capacity of 87,000 cubic feet (2,500 m^{3}) for a total of 213,000 cubic feet (6,000 m^{3}) with a crew of 95. Propulsion was by three in series Newport News impulse turbines delivering up to a continuous 7,500 shaft horsepower through reduction gears to a single screw of 17 ft 8 in (5.4 m) diameter. Electricity for extensive use throughout the ship, including deck windlass, capstans, winches and watertight doors was supplied by three 250 kilowatt General Electric generator sets which also charged a storage battery bank for emergency power in case of main plant failure. Six cargo holds were served by cargo side ports for No. 3 and No. 4 with hatches for the balance with each of the two masts having four 5 ton booms and the foremast an additional 25 ton boom.

=== Passenger accommodations ===
Capacity was for 134 first and 24 tourist class passengers with first class spaces done in a "modern Spanish" motif with first class accommodations having twin beds and designed to meet hotel standards of the time. All had telephones and most were outside rooms with sliding glass windows or ports. A swimming pool was located on the bridge deck partially open and partially inside a verandah.

== Service history ==
=== Commercial 1932–1942 ===
Haiti and sister ship Colombia provided scheduled commercial service on a route from New York to Port-au-Prince, Haiti, Kingston, Jamaica, Puerto Colombia and Cartagena, Colombia and Cristobal, Panama. After the ship's 1938–1939 transfer to the New York & Cuba Mail Steamship Company's Cuba Mail Line and renaming to Puerto Rico and then Monterey service included New York, Havana, Cuba and Vera Cruz, Mexico.

=== War Shipping Administration ===
Monterey was delivered by the New York & Cuba Mail Steamship Company to the War Shipping Administration on 14 February 1942 under a bareboat charter and operated by Atlantic, Gulf & West Indies Lines (AGWI Lines) acting as agent for WSA to meet Army transport requirements. On 6 August 1942 the ship was allocated to Navy under a sub-bareboat charter for "Repairing" while Navy was acquiring a group of commercial type vessels to modify into combat loaders (Note: Term for transports designed to deliver fully equipped combat troops with unit equipment and supplies to a combat zone vice "convoy loaded" where troops and equipment may be separated and require organization ashore in a rear area.) for the North African campaign. Title to the ship delivered to WSA on 25 September. Conversion of the ship to Navy requirements as prospective Alameda (AP-68) was cancelled when Navy found the ship unsuitable for the mission. (Note: The DANFS entry for Alameda (AP-68) mentions the owners of the much larger Matson liner; however, that ship, operated by WSA's agent Oceanic Steamship, was engaged in troop operations between New York and Halifax, Scotland and then at Casablanca. See MARAD status cards for that ship for operations during this period.) Other possibilities were explored, including conversion to a combined operations flagship, but those were abandoned and Monterey returned to Army support. On 16 January the ship was delivered to the War Department for Army operation as USAT Monterey.

Army operations in the West Indies and South Atlantic had been hampered by port congestion and transportation problems at the base in Trinidad into the spring of 1943 when a new 1,202-foot Army wharf, port and railway equipment improved operations. Along with the improvements the Transportation Corps command at Trinidad was assigned the USAT Monterey for direct support of Trinidad and bases in the West Indies, at Ascension Island and in Brazil.

On 20 March 1946 the ship was again delivered to AGWI Lines for operation for WSA until laid up in the Reserve Fleet at Lee Hall, Virginia on 26 June and sale for $650,000 on 14 August 1947 to the Republic of with delivery to the buyer on 16 April 1948.

=== Turkish service ===
The ship was renamed Cankiri and then Adana after sale.

== References cited ==
- Bykofsky, Joseph; Larson, Harold (1990). The Technical Services—The Transportation Corps: Operations Overseas. United States Army in World War II. Washington, DC: Center of Military History, United States Army. LCCN 56060000.
- Colton, T. (2 May 2014). "Newport News Shipbuilding, Newport News VA". ShipbuildingHistory. Archived from the original on 26 October 2014.
- Grover, David (1987). U.S. Army Ships and Watercraft of World War II. Naval Institute Press. ISBN 0-87021-766-6. LCCN 87015514.
- Larsson, Björn (15 November 2009). "Colombian Line (Colombian Steamship Co.)". Maritime Timetable Images. Björn Larsson.
- Larsson, Björn (2 April 2011). "Cuba Mail Line (New York & Cuba Mail Steamship Co. – Ward Line)". Maritime Timetable Images. Björn Larsson.
- Lloyds (1943–44). "Lloyd's Register" (PDF). Lloyd's Register (through PlimsollShipData).
- Maritime Administration. "Monterey". Ship History Database Vessel Status Card. U.S. Department of Transportation, Maritime Administration. Archived from the original on 4 March 2016.
- Maritime Administration. "Puerto Rico". Ship History Database Vessel Status Card. U.S. Department of Transportation, Maritime Administration. Archived from the original on 4 March 2016.
- Pacific Marine Review (1933). Pacific Marine Review (Consolidated 1933 issues). 'Official Organ: Pacific American Steamship Association/Shipowners' Association of the Pacific Coast.
- Roberts, Stephen S. (5 June 2007). "ALAMEDA (AP-68)". ShipScribe.
- United States Shipping Board (1933). Seventeenth Annual Report of the United States Shipping Board (Report). Government Printing Office.
- Weiss, George; Leonard, J. W. (1920). America's maritime progress. New York: The New York Marine News Company. LCCN 20021360.
