= SS Monterey (1952) =

Passenger ship

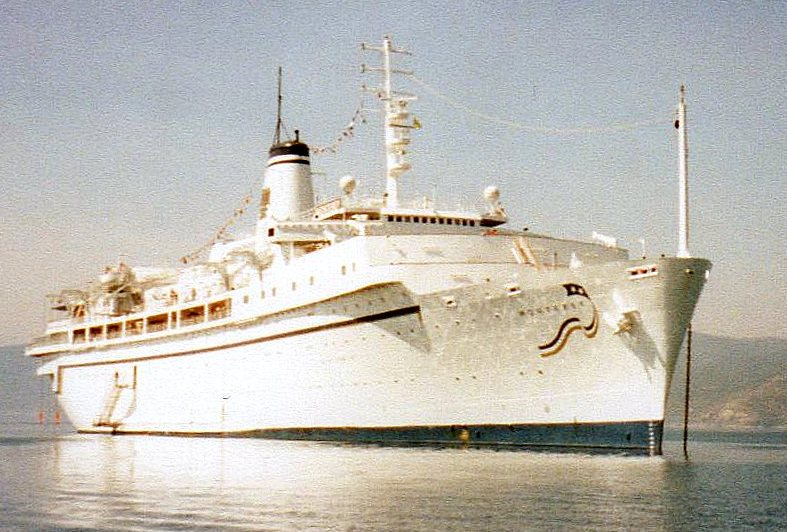

History
- Name: Free State Mariner (1952–1957); Monterey (1957–2006); Monte (2006)
- Operator: US Marine Corps; Matson Lines; Pacific Far East Line; Aloha Pacific; Star Lauro; MSC Cruises
- Builder: Bethlehem Shipbuilding Corporation Sparrowpoint, Maryland
- Launched: May 29, 1952
- In service: 1952
- Out of service: November 8, 2006
- Fate: Scrapped at Alang, India, 2006

Monterey was an American-built passenger ship. The ship was originally built as the freighter Free State Mariner, before being converted into a passenger liner and cruise ship that and served for over 50 years, ending her career with MSC Cruises.

== Service History ==
=== Cargo ship: Free State Mariner ===
On 29 May 1952, the ship was launched at the Bethlehem Shipbuilding shipyard in Sparrow's Point, Maryland as the turbine general cargo ship Free State Mariner of the type C4-S-1a ( Mariner class ), hull number 4507. The class of ship was specifically designed to be fast and reliable freighters and were ordered by the U.S. Maritime Administration. On 8 December 1952, the US Maritime Commission took over the ship for use by the US Marine Corps.

=== Matson Line ===
Matson Navigation Company took over the ship on July 28, 1955. Matson undertook a $60 million shipbuilding program which rebuilt her for Pacific Coast - Hawaii service. The ship was sent to the Willamette Iron & Steel Corporation shipyard in Portland, Oregon, where she was converted into a MARAD type P2-S1-1g combination ship. She and her sister ship Mariposa were the very first American liners ever to be given Sperry gyro-fin stabilisers, and the new system of rapid-opening hydraulic hatch covers.

On December 31, 1956, the vessel was delivered as the Monterey, reviving the name from the previous Monterey of 1931. The ship would maintain this name for the remainder of her career. The Monterey would accommodate just 365 in all First class accommodations. On January 9, 1957, the ship began her combined passenger and cargo service between San Francisco, Honolulu, Auckland and Sydney, operating together with her sister ship Mariposa. The Monterey and her sister ship, would end up being the final passenger ships to sail for Matson Line.

=== Pacific Far East Line ===
On February 15, 1971, Matson sold the Monterey to the Pacific Far East Line, also based in San Francisco, which used it with her sister ship Mariposa, on Pacific cruises until January 19, 1978, and laid it up in 1978 when government aid to maintain the service ended.

On April 10, 1979, the ship was sold to the San Francisco-based airline President World Airways, which sold the ship to the San Francisco-based company American Maritime Holdings on November 2, 1979.

=== Aloha Pacific Cruises ===
On June 24, 1986, the Monterey returned to the shipyard in Portland, where it was first made seaworthy again. After being sold to the shipping company Aloha Pacific Cruises from Alexandria, the ship arrived at the Tacoma Boatbuilding shipyard in 1987. Between December 1987 and July 21, 1988, the ship was finally converted into a cruise ship at the Wärtsilä shipyard in Turku/Åbo, Finland.

From September 1988, the Monterey undertook Pacific cruises from her base port of San Francisco before being re-laid up in Honolulu on May 13, 1989.

=== Star Lauro to MSC Cruises ===
On March 16, 1990, the shipping company Star Lauro, now owned by Mediterranean Shipping Company (MSC), bought the steamer and put her into service under the Panama flag. On October 1, 1995, the Monterey was absorbed into the newly created MSC Cruises by her final shipping company. This would be one of the first ships to sail under the newly created MSC cruises livery. The ship would be used for cruises in the Mediterranean over the following decade. In October 2006, the ship was decommissioned and sold for scrap. Monterey was renamed Monte for her final voyage to India and reached Alang on November 3, 2006, where demolition of the 54-year-old ship began two days later.
