= Monterrei =

Monterrei Monterrey
- Municipality
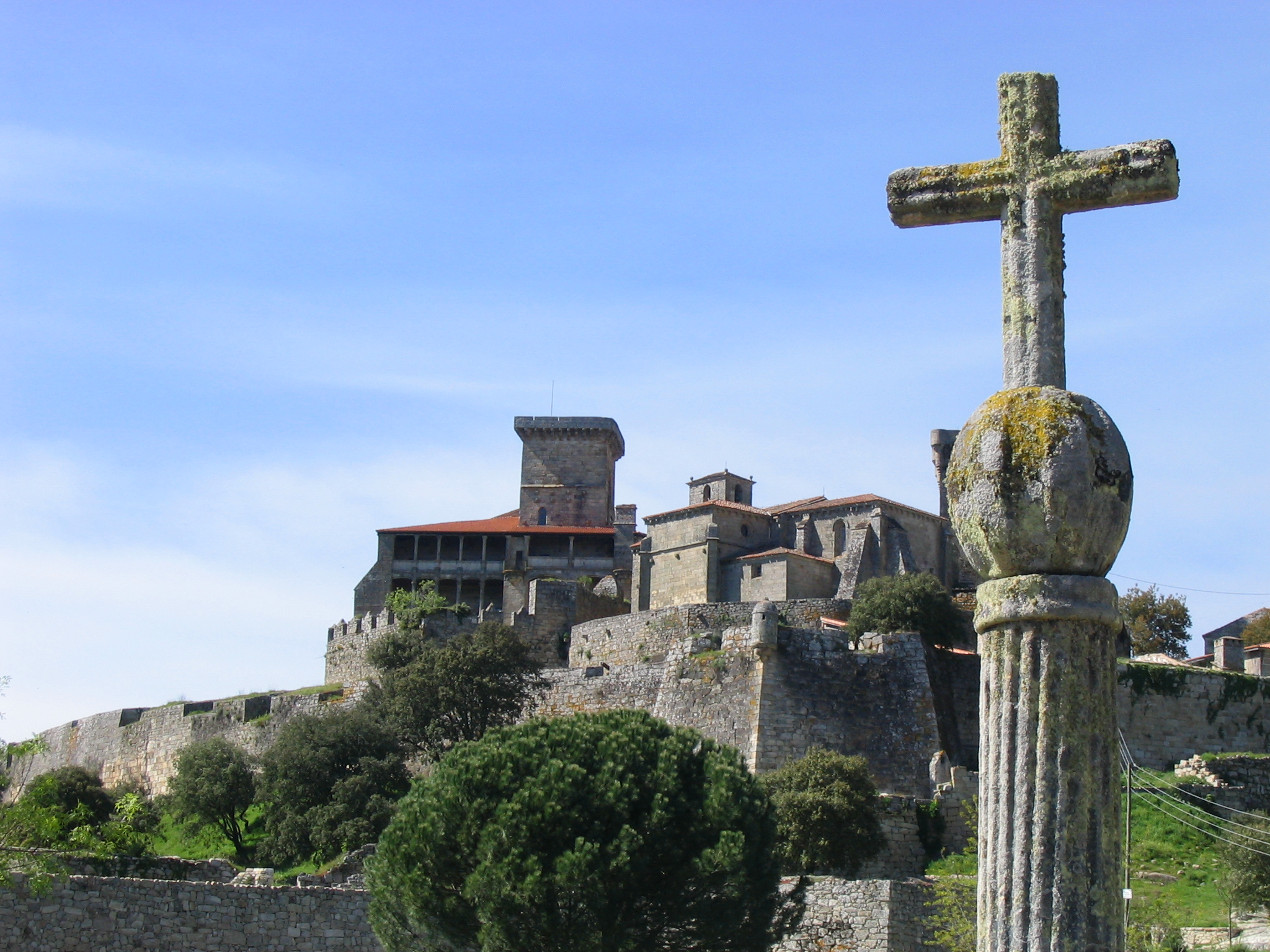
- Castle of Monterrei

- Flag Coat of arms
- Location of Monterrei
- Coordinates: 41°57′48″N 7°26′57″W
- Country: Spain
- Autonomous community: Galicia
- Province: Ourense
- Comarca: Verín

Government
  - Mayor: José Luis Suárez Conde (PP)

Area
  - Total: 119.1 km^{2} (46.0 sq mi)
- Elevation: 521 m (1,709 ft)

Population (2025-01-01)
  - Total: 2,403
  - Density: 20.18/km^{2} (52.26/sq mi)
- Time zone: UTC+1 (CET)
  - Summer (DST): UTC+2 (CEST)
- Website: www.monterrei.es

Monterrei (Spanish: Monterrey), is a municipality in the province of Ourense, in the autonomous community of Galicia, Spain. It belongs to the comarca of Verín.

Monterrei is well known for its castle, built in the 10th century. The Mexican city of Monterrey was named in honour of Gaspar de Zúñiga, 5th Count of Monterrey, as well as the American city of Monterey.

== Parishes ==
- Albarellos (Santiago)
- La Magdalena
- Estevesiños (San Mamede)
- Flariz (San Pedro)
- Infesta (San Vicenzo)
- Medeiros (Santa María)
- Monterrey
- Rebordondo (San Martiño)
- San Cristóbal
- Vences (Santa Eulalia)
- Villaza
