= Wakabayashi =

Wakabayashi (written: 若林 lit. "young forest") is a Japanese surname. Notable people with the surname include:

- Akiko Wakabayashi (若林 映子; born 1941), Japanese actress
- Arthur Tsuneo Wakabayashi (born 1932), Canadian civil servant
- Fumie Wakabayashi (若林 史江; born 1977), Japanese stock critic and radio personality
- Gō Wakabayashi (若林 豪; born 1939), Japanese actor
- Herb Wakabayashi (1944–2015), Canadian ice hockey player
- Hiroyuki Wakabayashi (若林 広幸; 1949–2026), Japanese architect
- Kaoru Wakabayashi (若林 薫; born 1938), Japanese basketball player
- Katsunori Wakabayashi (若林 克法), Japanese physicist
- Kota Wakabayashi (若林 康太; born 1997), Japanese sprinter
- Manabu Wakabayashi (若林 学; born 1979), Japanese footballer
- Masatoshi Wakabayashi (若林 正俊; 1934–2023), Japanese politician
- Masayasu Wakabayashi (若林 正恭; born 1978), Japanese comedian, television presenter and actor
- Mel Wakabayashi (1943–2023), Canadian ice hockey player
- Naomi Wakabayashi (若林 直美; born 1975), Japanese actress and voice actress
- Raizo Wakabayashi (若林 賚蔵; 1866–1941), Japanese politician
- Shigeki Wakabayashi (若林 重喜; born 1966), Japanese baseball player
- Tadashi Wakabayashi (若林 忠志; 1908–1965), Japanese baseball player
- Takeo Wakabayashi (若林 竹雄; 1907–1937), Japanese footballer

== Fictional characters ==
- Genzo Wakabayashi, a character in the manga series Captain Tsubasa
- Yujiro Wakabayashi, a character in the series Kamen Rider Revice
- Iori Wakabayashi (若林 伊織), a character in the manga series Ojisan to Marshmallow
- Wakabayashi-kun, a character in the manga series Chibi Maruko-chan

== See also ==
- Wakabayashi Station (disambiguation), multiple railway stations in Japan
- 5128 Wakabayashi, a main-belt asteroid
- Wakabayashi-ku, Sendai, a ward in Sendai, Miyagi Prefecture, Japan
