= Hasekura Tsunenaga =

Japanese samurai and diplomat (1571–1622)

- 支倉 常長
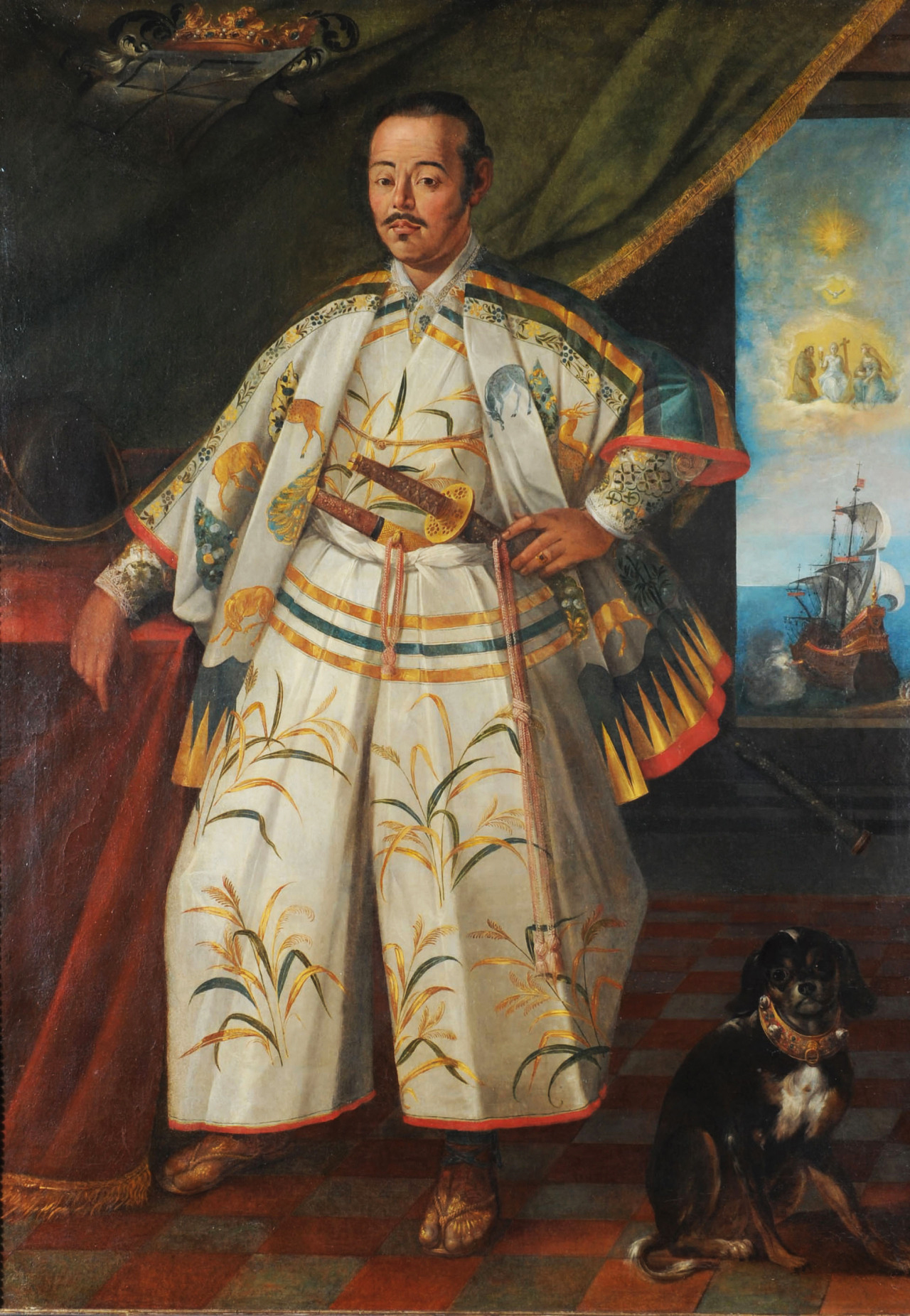
- Hasekura portrayed during his mission in Rome by Archita Ricci, 1615
- Born: Yamaguchi Yoichi (山口与市); 1571; Sendai Domain
- Died: 7 August 1622 (aged 50–51); Ōsato, Miyagi, Tokugawa Shogunate
- Other name: Don Felipe Francisco Hasekura (Christianized name)
- Occupation: Diplomat
- Children: Hasekura Yoritomo (d. 1640), Hasekura Yorimichi (?–?)
- Family: Hasekura Tsunenobu (d. c. 1685)

Itinerary and dates of the travels of Hasekura Tsunenaga

Hasekura Rokuemon Tsunenaga (支倉 六右衛門 常長; 1571–1622) was a kirishitan Japanese samurai and retainer of Date Masamune, the daimyō of Sendai. He was of Japanese imperial descent with ancestral ties to Emperor Kanmu. Other names include Philip Francis Faxicura, Felipe Francisco Faxicura, and Philippus Franciscus Faxecura Rocuyemon in period European sources, as he took a baptismal name upon converting to Catholicism.

In the years 1613 through 1620, Hasekura headed the Keichō Embassy (慶長使節), a diplomatic mission to Pope Paul V. He visited New Spain and various other ports-of-call in Europe on the way. On the return trip, Hasekura and his companions re-traced their route across New Spain in 1619, sailing from Acapulco for Manila, and then sailing north to Japan in 1620.

Although Hasekura's embassy was cordially received in Spain and Rome, it happened at a time when Japan was moving toward the suppression of Christianity. European monarchs refused the trade agreements Hasekura had been seeking. He returned to Japan in 1620 and died of illness a year later, his embassy seemingly ending with few results in an increasingly isolationist Japan.

Japan's next embassy to Europe would not occur until more than 200 years later, following two centuries of isolation, with the "First Japanese Embassy to Europe" in 1862.

== Early life ==
Hasekura had an official coat of arms, consisting of a Buddhist swastika crossed by two arrows, on a white shield and surmounted by a crown, on an orange background

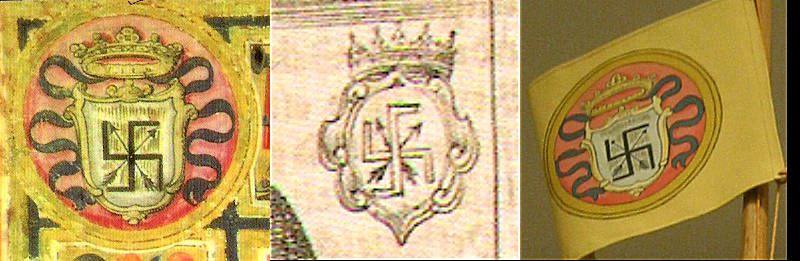
Hasekura's coat of arms in contemporary depictions

Hasekura Tsunenaga was born in year 2 of the Genki era (1571) in Ushū, Okitama-no-kōri, Nagai-sō, Tateishi-mura (now part of modern day Yonezawa in Yamagata Prefecture. He was the son of Yamaguchi Tsuneshige (山口常成), who had ancestral ties with Emperor Kanmu. He was a mid-level noble samurai in the Sendai Domain in northern Japan who had the opportunity to directly serve the daimyō, Date Masamune, and received an annual stipend of 1200 koku. He spent his young adulthood at Kamitate Castle (上楯城) that was constructed by his grandfather Hasekura Tsunemasa (常正). The place of origin of the family name Hasekura was Hasekura Village (支倉村), now Hasekura Ward (支倉) in Kawasaki City.

Hasekura and Date Masamune were of roughly the same age, and it is recorded that several important missions were given to Tsunenaga as his representative. It is also recorded that Hasekura served as a samurai during the Japanese invasion of Korea under the Taikō Toyotomi Hideyoshi, for six months in 1597.

In 1612, Hasekura's father, Hasekura Tsunenari (支倉 常成), was indicted for corruption, and he was put to death in 1613. His fief was confiscated, and his son should normally have been executed as well. Date, however, gave him the opportunity to redeem his honour by placing him in charge of the Embassy to Europe, and soon gave him back his territories as well.

== History of early contacts between Japan and Spain ==
The Spanish started trans-Pacific voyages between New Spain (present-day Mexico and the U.S. state of California) and the Philippines in 1565. The famous Manila galleons carried silver from Mexican mines westward to the entrepôt of Manila in the Spanish possession of the Philippines. There, the silver was used to purchase spices and trade goods gathered from throughout Asia, including (until 1638) goods from Japan. The return route of the Manila galleons, first charted by the Spanish navigator Andrés de Urdaneta, took the ships northeast into the Kuroshio Current (also known as the Japan Current) off the coast of Japan, and then across the Pacific to the west coast of Mexico, landing eventually in Acapulco.

Spanish ships were occasionally shipwrecked on the coasts of Japan due to bad weather, initiating contacts with the country. The Spanish wished to expand the Christian faith in Japan. Efforts to expand influence in Japan were met by stiff resistance from the Jesuits, who had started the evangelizing of the country in 1549, as well as by the opposition of the Portuguese and Dutch who did not wish to see Spain participate in Japanese trade. However, some Japanese, such as Christopher and Cosmas, are known to have crossed the Pacific onboard Spanish galleons as early as 1587. It is known that gifts were exchanged between the governor of the Philippines and Toyotomi Hideyoshi, who thanks him in a 1597 letter, writing "The black elephant in particular I found most unusual."

On 25 July, 1609, the Manila galleons San Francisco, Santa Ana, and the flagship (almiranta) San Antonio set sail from Cavite, then a major Philippine shipyard during the sixteenth and seventeenth centuries, towards Acapulco. The ships ran into storms on 10 August around the Islas de los Ladrones (present-day Northern Mariana Islands); only the San Antonio managed to successfully reach Acapulco, while the Santa Ana was almost entirely destroyed and had to land at Bungo Province (present-day Ōita Prefecture). The San Francisco was severely damaged, losing its mast and leaking water, and later struck a reef nearby the hamlet Yubanda (likely present-day Iwawada, in Onjuku, Chiba). Fifty-six sailors drowned; the rest survived by clinging to floating wreckage. Upon getting to land, a few sailors found some locals from Yubanda at a nearby rice paddy field, who took the survivors to their hamlet. The captain of the San Francisco, Rodrigo de Vivero, was recognized as a former governor of the Philippines, and was granted an audience with the retired shōgun Tokugawa Ieyasu. de Vivero drafted a treaty, signed on 29 November 1609, whereby the Spaniards could establish a factory in eastern Japan, mining specialists would be imported from New Spain, Spanish ships would be allowed to visit Japan in case of necessity, and a Japanese embassy would be sent to the Spanish court.

=== First Japanese expeditions to the Americas ===
==== 1610 San Buenaventura ====
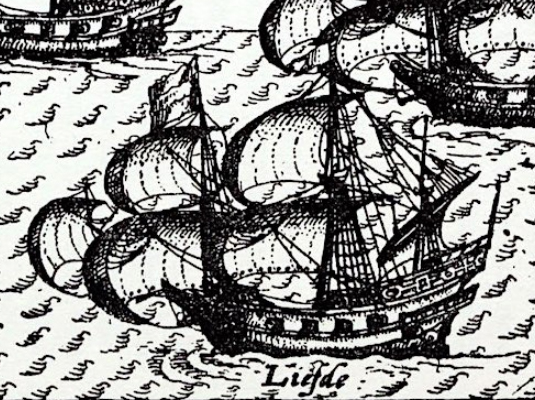
The Japanese ship San Buenaventura was built on the model of Liefde (depicted here), the ship on which William Adams originally reached Japan.

A Franciscan friar named Luis Sotelo, who was proselytizing in the area of what is now modern Tokyo, convinced Tokugawa Ieyasu and his son Tokugawa Hidetada to send him as a representative to New Spain (Mexico) on one of their ships, in order to advance the trade treaty. Rodrigo de Vivero offered to sail on the Japanese ship in order to guarantee the safety of their reception in New Spain, but insisted that another Franciscan, named Alonso Muños, be sent instead as the shōgun's representative. In 1610, Rodrigo de Vivero, several Spanish sailors, the Franciscan father, and 22 Japanese representatives led by the trader Tanaka Shōsuke sailed to Mexico aboard the San Buenaventura, a ship built by the English navigator William Adams for the shōgun. Once in New Spain, Alonso Muños met with the Viceroy Luis de Velasco, who agreed to send an ambassador to Japan in the person of the famous explorer Sebastián Vizcaíno with the added mission of exploring the "Gold and silver islands" ("Isla de Plata") that were thought to be east of the Japanese isles.

Vizcaíno arrived in Japan in 1611 and had many meetings with the shōgun and feudal lords. These encounters were tainted by his poor respect for Japanese customs, the mounting resistance of the Japanese towards Catholic proselytism, and the intrigues of the Dutch against Spanish ambitions. Vizcaíno finally left to search for the "Silver island", during the search he encountered bad weather which forced him to return to Japan as his ship suffered heavy damage.

==== 1612: San Sebastian ====
Without waiting for Vizcaíno, another ship – built in Izu by the Tokugawa shogunate under the minister of the Navy Mukai Shōgen, and named San Sebastian – left for Mexico on 9 September 1612 with Luis Sotelo onboard as well as two representatives of Date Masamune, with the objective of advancing the trade agreement with New Spain. However, the ship foundered a few miles from Uraga, and the expedition had to be abandoned.

== The 1613 embassy project ==
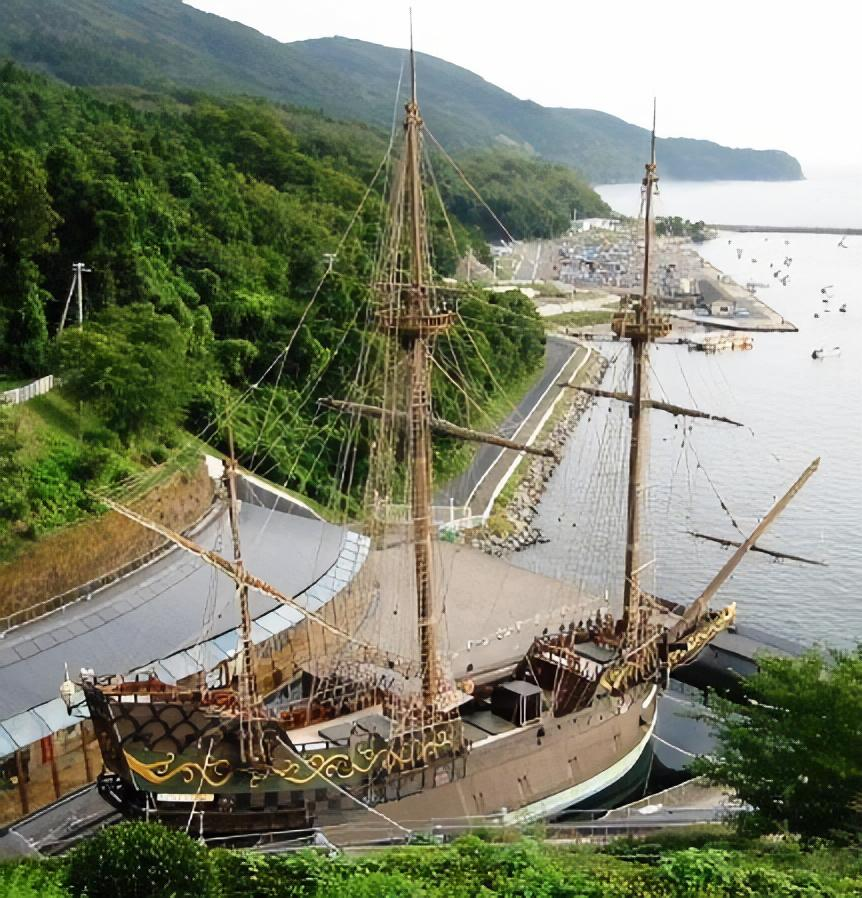
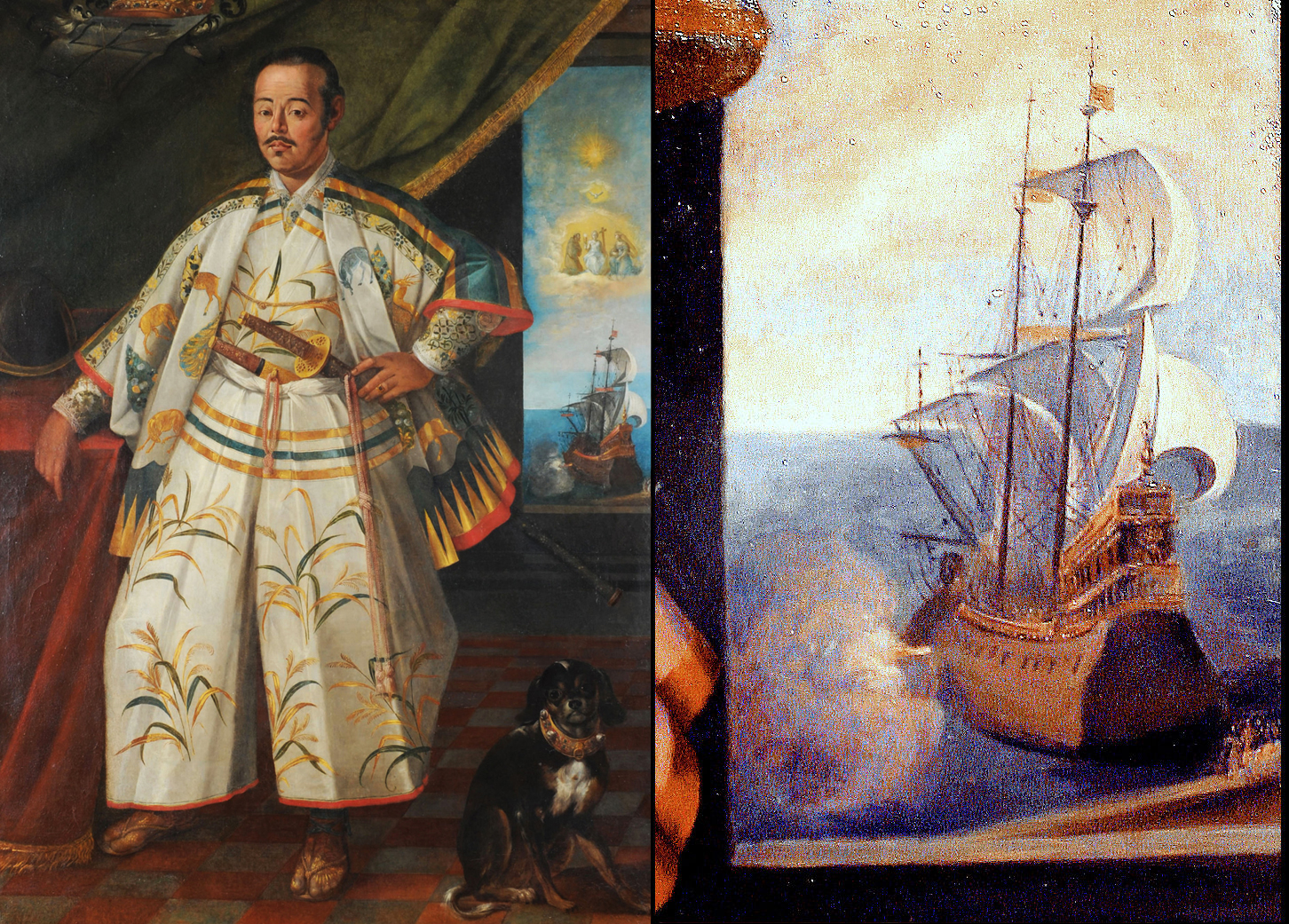
Top: A replica of the Japanese-built galleon San Juan Bautista, in Ishinomaki, Japan. Bottom left: The San Juan Bautista is represented in Deruet's painting as a galleon with Hasekura's flag on the top mast. Bottom right: detail of the ship.

The shōgun had a new galleon built in Japan to bring Vizcaíno back to New Spain, together with a Japanese embassy accompanied by Luis Sotelo. The galleon, named San Juan Bautista, took 45 days to build, with the participation of technical experts from the Bakufu (the Minister of the Navy Mukai Shōgen, an acquaintance of William Adams with whom he built several ships, dispatched his chief carpenter), 800 shipwrights, 700 smiths, and 3,000 carpenters. The daimyō of Sendai, Date Masamune, was put in charge of the project. He named Hasekura to lead the mission:

"The Great Ship left Toshima-Tsukinoura for the Southern Barbarians on 15 September Japanese calendar, with at its head Hasekura Rokuemon Tsunenaga, and those called Imaizumi Sakan, Matsuki Shusaku, Nishi Kyusuke, Tanaka Taroemon, Naitō Hanjurō, Sonohoka Kyuemon, Kuranojō, Tonomo, Kitsunai, Kyuji, as well as several others under Rokuemon, as well as 40 Southern Barbarians, 10 men of Mukai Shōgen, and also tradespeople, to a total 180."

The objective of the Japanese embassy was both to discuss trade agreements with the Spanish crown in Madrid, and to meet with the Pope in Rome. Date Masamune displayed a great will to welcome the Catholic religion in his domain: he invited Sotelo and authorized the propagation of Christianity in 1611. In his letter to the Pope, brought by Hasekura, he wrote: "I'll offer my land for a base of your missionary work. Send us as many padres as possible."

Sotelo, in his own account of the travels, emphasizes the religious dimension of the mission, claiming that the main objective was to spread the Christian faith in northern Japan:

"I was formerly dispatched as ambassador of Idate Masamune, who holds the reins of the kingdom of Oxu [Japanese:奥州] (which is in the Eastern part of Japan)—who, while he has not yet been reborn through baptism, has been catechized, and was desirous that the Christian faith should be preached in his kingdom—together with another noble of his Court, Philippus Franciscus Faxecura Rocuyemon, (Note: In the Japanese of the era, the sound now transcribed as h was pronounced as an f before all vowels, not just u. Likewise s was sometimes pronounced sh before /e/, not only before /i/, and the syllable ゑ (now read as e), was pronounced ye. On the other hand, the use of x to represent the sh sound is specific to Portuguese and the older pronunciation of Spanish.) to the Roman Senate & to the one who at that time was in charge of the Apostolic See, His Holiness Pope Paul V." (Note: Nempe fuisse me quondam Idate Masamune, qui regni Oxu (quod est in Orientali Iaponiæ parte) gubernacula tenet, nec dum quidem per baptismum regenerato, sed tamen Catechumeno, & qui Christianam fidem in suo regno prædicari cupiebat, simul cum alio suæ Curiæ optimate Philippo Francisco Faxecura Retuyemon[sic]ad Romanam Curiam & qui tunc Apostolicæ sedis culmen tenebat SS. Papam Paulum V. qui ad cœlos evolavit, Legatum expeditum. (p. 1))

The embassy was probably, at that time, part of a plan to diversify and increase trade with foreign countries, before the participation of Christians in the Osaka rebellion triggered a radical reaction from the shogunate, with the interdiction of Christianity in the territories it directly controlled, in 1614.

== Trans-Pacific voyage ==
Upon completion, the ship left on 28 October 1613 for Acapulco with around 180 people on board, including 10 samurai of the shōgun (provided by the Minister of the Navy Mukai Shōgen Tadakatsu), 12 samurai from Sendai, 120 Japanese merchants, sailors, and servants, and around 40 Spaniards and Portuguese, including Sebastián Vizcaíno who, in his own words, only had the quality of a passenger.

=== New Spain (Acapulco) ===
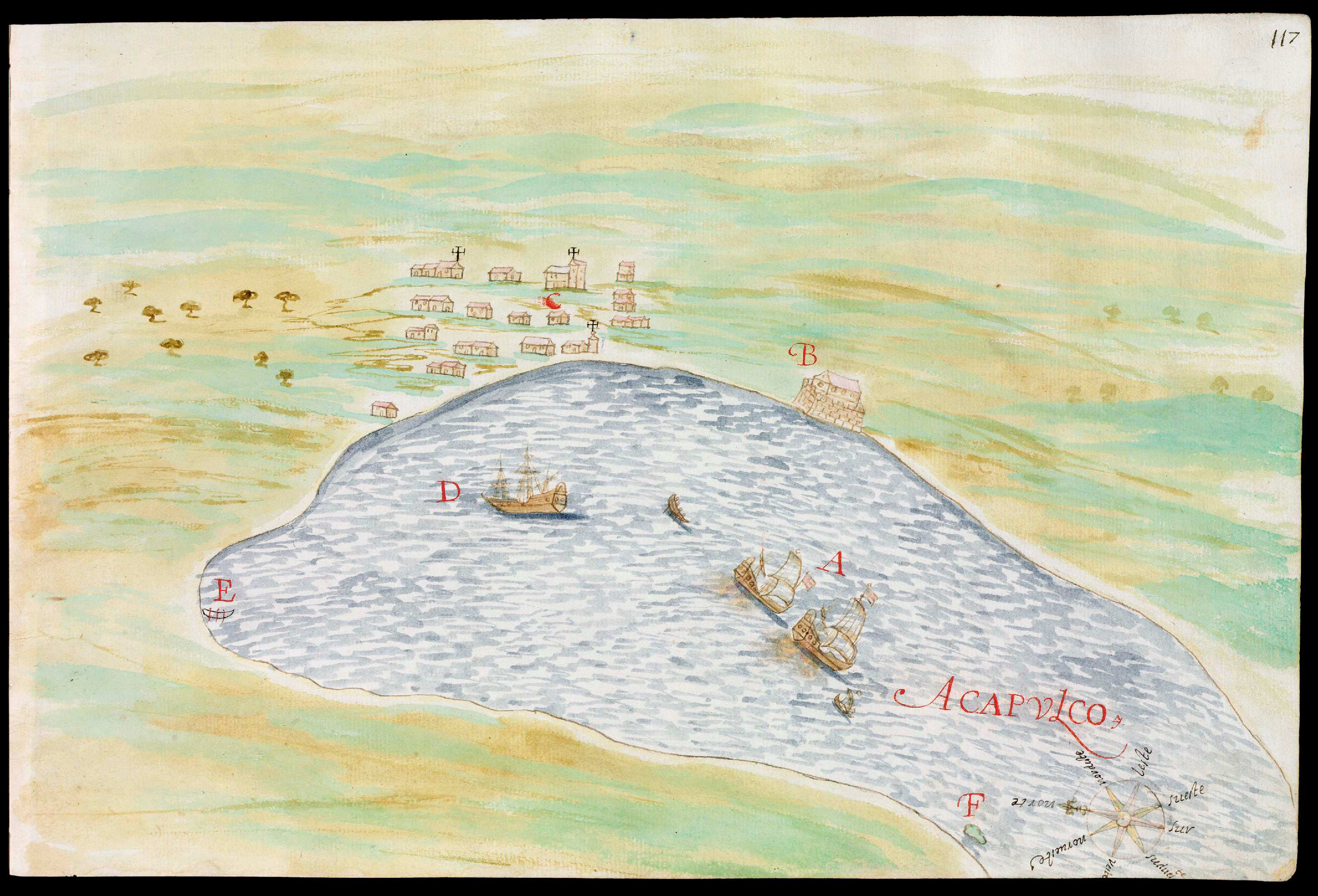
Nicolás de Cardona, in his 1632 report submitted to the king of Spain, included a view of the bay and city of Acapulco, mentioning the presence of "a ship from Japan" (letter "D"), probably the San Juan Bautista. Cardona was in Acapulco between end of 1614 and 21 March 1615. The full legend reads: A. The ships of the expedition. B. The castle of San Diego. C. The town. D. A ship that has come from Japan. E. Los Manzanillos. F. El Grifo.

The ship sighted Cape Mendocino on 26 December 1613, continuing along the California coast and landing at Zacatula in Colima on 22 January 1614. The delegation arrived at Acapulco on 25 January, after three months at sea. The Japanese were received with great ceremony, but had to wait in Acapulco until orders were received regarding how to organize the rest of their travels.

Fights erupted between the Japanese and the Spaniards, especially Vizcaíno, apparently due to some disputes on the handling of presents from the Japanese ruler. A contemporary journal, written by the Nahuatl annalist Chimalpahin, relates Vizcaíno was seriously wounded in the fight:

"Señor Sebastián Vizcaíno is also still coming slowly, coming hurt; the Japanese injured him when they beat and stabbed him at Acapulco, as became known here in Mexico, because of all the things coming along that had been made his responsibility in Japan".

Following these fights, orders were promulgated on 4 and 5 March to bring peace back. The orders explained that "the Japanese should not be submitted to attacks in this Land, but they should remit their weapons until their departure, except for Hasekura Tsunenaga and eight of his retinue ... The Japanese will be free to go where they want, and should be treated properly. They should not be abused in words or actions. They will be free to sell their goods. These orders have been promulgated to the Spanish, the Indians, the Mulattos, the Mestizos, and the Blacks, and those who don't respect them will be punished".

=== New Spain (Mexico) ===
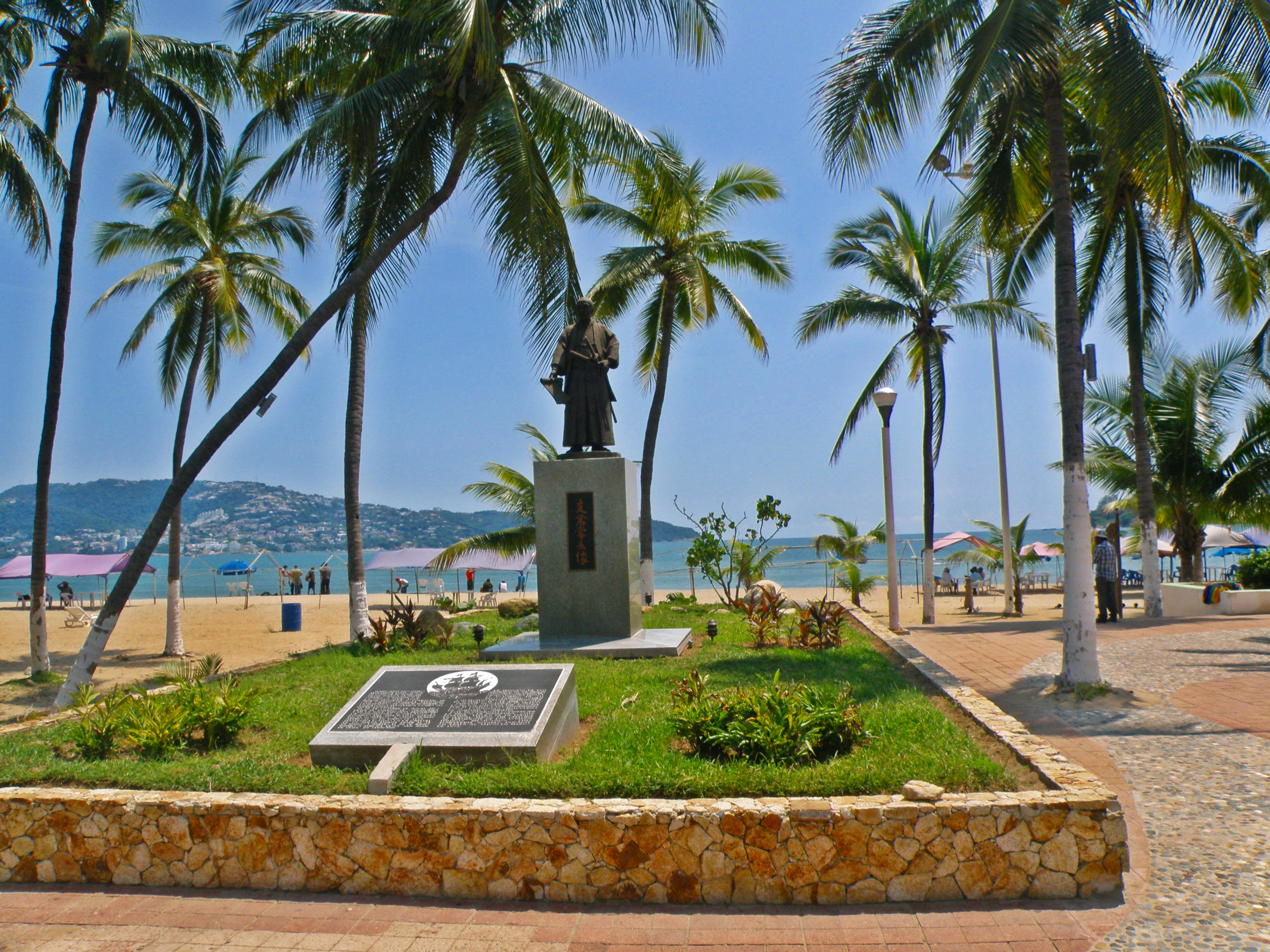
Statue of Hasekura Tsunenaga on Japan Square in Acapulco

The embassy remained two months in Acapulco and entered Mexico City on 24 March, where it was received with great ceremony. The ultimate mission for the embassy was to go on to Europe. The embassy spent some time in Mexico, and then went to Veracruz to board the fleet of Don Antonio Oquendo.

Chimalpahin gives some account of the visit of Hasekura.

"This is the second time that the Japanese have landed one of their ships on the shore at Acapulco. They are transporting here all things of iron, and writing desks, and some cloth that they are to sell here."
"It became known here in Mexico and was said that the reason their ruler the Emperor of Japan sent this said lordly emissary and ambassador here, is to go in Rome to see the Holy Father Paul V, and to give him their obedience concerning the holy church, so that all the Japanese want to become Christians".

Hasekura was settled in a house next to the Convent of San Francisco, and met with the Viceroy. He explained to him that he was also planning to meet King Philip III to offer him peace and to obtain that the Japanese could come to Mexico for trade. On Wednesday 9 April 20 Japanese were baptized, and 22 more on 20 April by the archbishop in Mexico, don Juan Pérez de la Serna, at the Convent of San Francisco. Altogether 63 of them received confirmation on 25 April. Hasekura waited for his travel to Europe to be baptized there:

"But the lordly emissary, the ambassador, did not want to be baptized here; it was said that he will be baptized later in Spain".

==== Departure for Europe ====
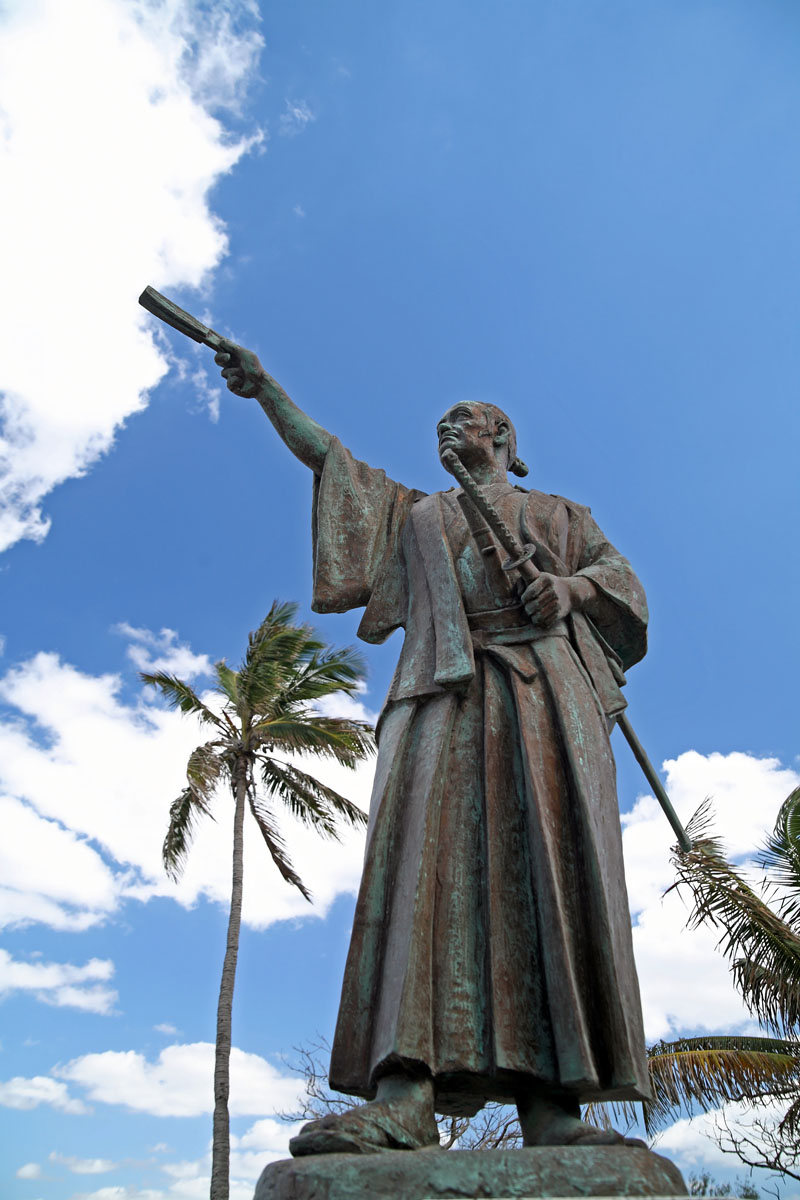
Statue of Hasekura Tsunenaga at the Sendai Castle Wall Park located in the heart of Old Havana, Cuba

Chimalpahin explains that Hasekura left some of his compatriots behind before leaving for Europe:

"The Ambassador of Japan set out and left for Spain. In going he divided his vassals; he took a certain number of Japanese, and he left an equal number here as merchants to trade and sell things."

The fleet left for Europe on the San Jose on 10 June. Hasekura had to leave the largest parts of the Japanese group behind, who were to wait in Acapulco for the return of the embassy.

Some of them, as well as those from the previous travel of Tanaka Shōsuke, returned to Japan the same year, sailing back with the San Juan Bautista:

"Today, Tuesday the 14th of the month of October of the year 1614, was when some Japanese set out from Mexico here going home to Japan.; they lived here in Mexico for four years. Some still remained here; they earn a living trading and selling here the goods they brought with them from Japan."

=== Cuba ===
The embassy stopped and changed ships in Havana in Cuba in July 1614. The embassy stayed in Havana for six days. A bronze statue was erected on 26 April 2001 at the head of Havana Bay.

== Mission to Europe ==
Hasekura headed the Keichō Embassy (慶長使節) (Note: In the name "Keichō Embassy", the noun "Keichō" refers to the nengō (Japanese era name) after "Bunroku" and before "Genna." In other words, the Keichō Embassy commenced during Keichō, which was a time period spanning the years from 1596 through 1615.), a diplomatic mission to Pope Paul V and Europe from 1613 through 1620. It was preceded by the Tenshō embassy (天正使節) of 1582. Crossing the Pacific aboard the San Juan Bautista—a ship built for the purpose by Masamune—Hasekura traveled to New Spain (now Mexico), arriving in Acapulco and departing from Veracruz. He visited various other ports-of-call in Europe on the way. On the return trip, Hasekura and his companions re-traced their route across New Spain in 1619, sailing from Acapulco for Manila, and then sailing north to Japan in 1620. He is conventionally considered the first Japanese ambassador in the Americas and in Spain. (Note: The Keichō Embassy was, in fact, preceded by a Sengoku period mission headed by Mancio Itō with Alessandro Valignano in 1582–1590. Although less well-known and less well-documented, this historic mission is sometimes referred to as the "Tenshō Embassy" because it was initiated in the Tenshō era. This venture was organized by three daimyōs of Western Japan – Ōmura Sumitada, Ōtomo Sōrin and Arima Harunobu.)

=== Spain ===
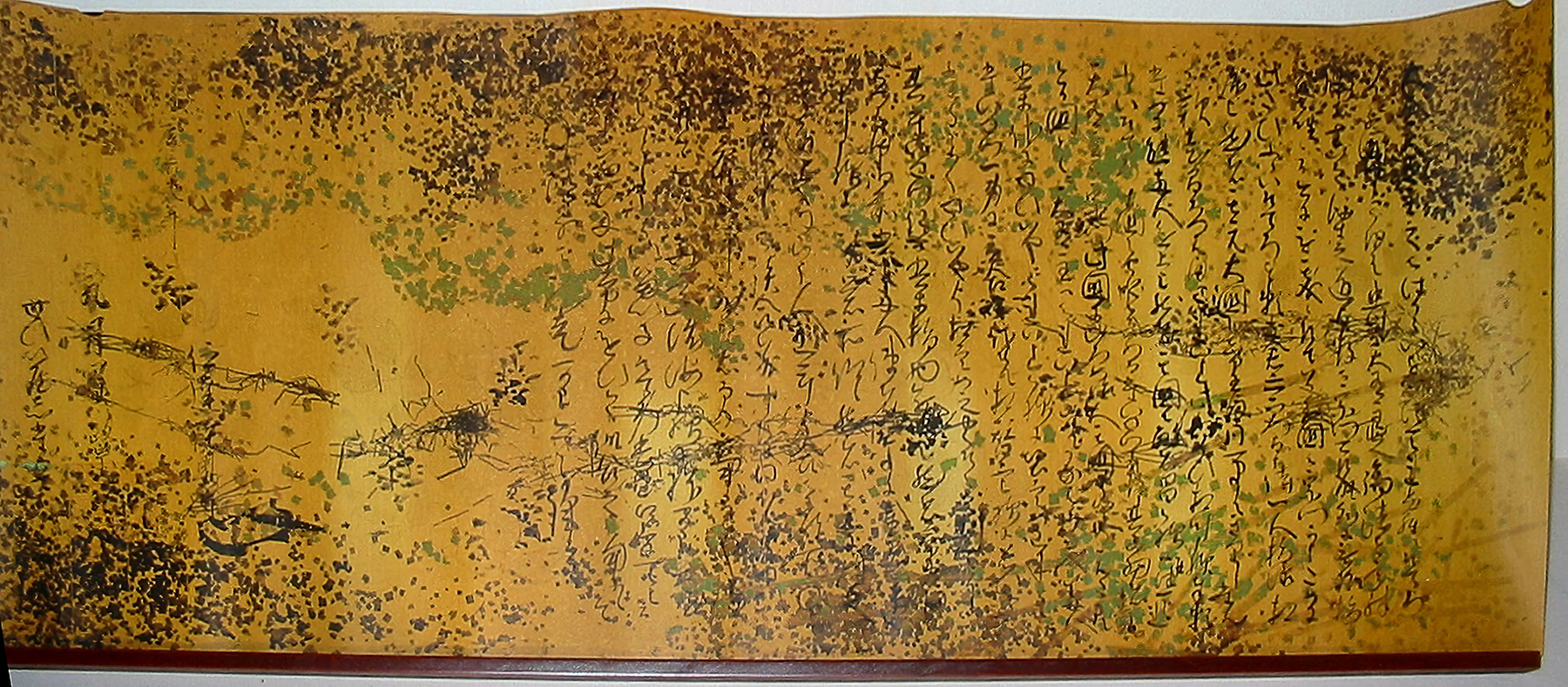
Historic letter from the first Japanese embassy to Spain, kept at Seville Town Hall

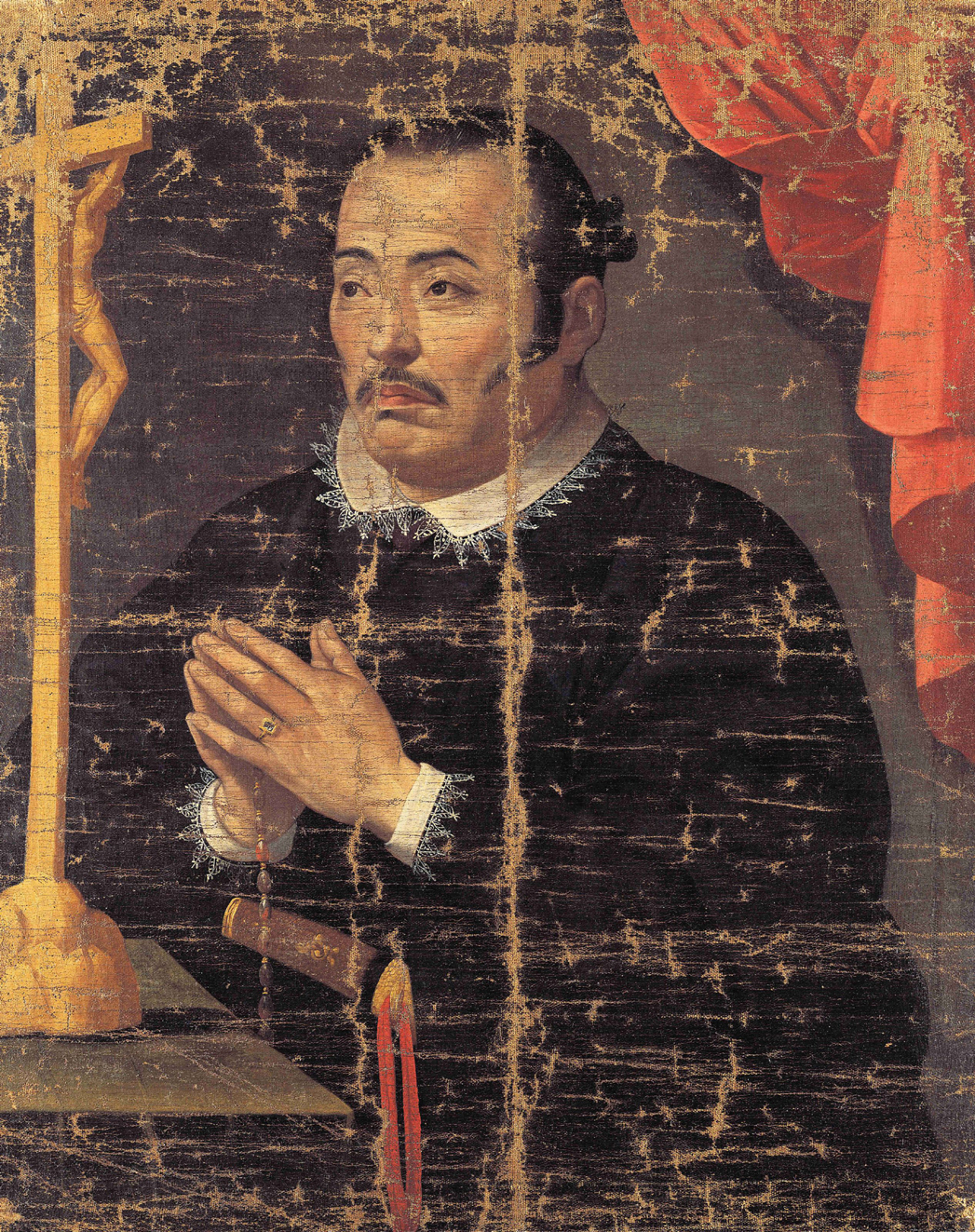
Hasekura in prayer, following his conversion in Madrid in 1615

The fleet arrived in Sanlúcar de Barrameda on 5 October 1614.

"The fleet arrived safely finally, after some dangers and storms, to the port of Sanlúcar de Barrameda on 5 October, where the Duke of Medina Sidonia was advised of the arrival. He sent carriages to honor them and accommodate the Ambassador and his gentlemen". (Note: From Scipione Amati, "Historia del regno di Voxu", 1615: "Se llegó por fin a salvo, después de algunos peligros y tempestades al puerto de Sanlúcar de Barrameda el 5 de Octubre, donde residiendo el Duque de Medina Sidonia y avisado del arribo, envió carrozas para honrarlos, recibirlos y acomodar en ellas al Embajador y a sus gentiles hombres, habiéndoles preparado un suntuoso alojamiento; y después de haber cumplido con esta obligación como correspondía, y de regalarlos con toda liberalidad, a instancias de la ciudad de Sevilla hizo armar dos galeras, las cuales llevaron a los embajadores a CORIA, donde fueron hospedados por orden de la dicha Ciudad por Don Pedro Galindo, veinticuatro, el cual se ocupó con gran diligencia en tener satisfecho el ánimo del Embajador con todos los placeres y regalos posibles, procurando este entretanto que preparasen ropas nuevas a su séquito y ayudantes para resplandecer con más decoro y pompa a la entrada en Sevilla. Mientras se resolvía esta cuestión, la Ciudad determinó enviar a Coria a Don Diego de Cabrera, hermano del padre Sotelo, a Don Bartolomé López de Mesa, del hábito de Calatraba, a Don Bernardo de Ribera, a Don Pedro Galindo y a multitud de jurados y otros caballeros para que en su nombre besaran la mano al Embajador y lo felicitaron por su llegada a salvo. Sobre esto, quedó el Embajador contentísimo, agradeció mucho a la Ciudad que por su generosidad se complacía en honrarle, y departió con los dichos caballeros mostrando mucha prudencia en su trato". "A veintiuno de Octubre del dicho año la Ciudad hizo otra demostración de la mayor cortesía para el recibimiento del Embajador y del Padre Sotelo mandando carrozas, cabalgaduras y gran número de caballeros y de nobles que lo escoltaron formando una cabalgata de gran solemnidad. Saliendo el Embajador de Coria, vio con sumo placer el honor que se le había preparado, la pompa de los caballeros y la gran cantidad de gente que lo acompañó durante su camino hacia Sevilla". "Cerca de Triana y antes de cruzar el puente, se multiplicó de tal manera el número de carrozas, caballos y gentes de todo género, que no bastaba la diligencia de dos alguaciles y de otros ministros de la justicia para poder atravesarlo. Finalmente compareció el Conde de Salvatierra. Asistente de la Ciudad, con gran número de titulados y con los restantes veinticuatro y caballeros; y el embajador desmontando de la carroza, montó a caballo con el Capitán de su guardia y Caballerizo, vestido sobriamente, a la usanza del Japón, y mostrando al Asistente lo obligado que quedaba de la mucha cortesía y honores que la Ciudad se servía de usar con él, fue puesto en medio del dicho Asistente y Alguaciles Mayores y prosiguiéndose la cabalgata con increíble aplauso y contento de la gente, por la Puerta de Triana se dirigieron al Alcalzar Real.")

"The Japanese ambassador Hasekura Rokuemon, sent by Joate Masamune, king of Boju, entered Seville on Wednesday, 23 October 1614. He was accompanied by 30 Japanese with blades, their captain of the guard, and 12 bowmen and halberdiers with painted lances and blades of ceremony. The captain of the guard was Christian and was called Don Thomas, the son of a Japanese martyr". (Note: Miércoles 23 de octubre de 1614 años entró en Sevilla el embaxador Japon Faxera Recuremon, embiado de Joate Masamune, rey de Boju. Traía treinta hombres japones con cuchillas, con su capitán de la guardia, y doce flecheros y alabarderos con lanças pintadas y sus cuchillas de abara. El capitán era christiano y se llamaba don Thomas, y era hijo de un mártyr Japón. Venía a dar la obediencia a Su Santidad por su rey y reyno, que se avía baptizado. Todos traían rosarios al cuello; y él venía a recibir el baptismo de mano de Su Santidad. Venía en su compañía fray Luis Sotelo, natural de Sevilla, religioso de San Francisco recoleto. Salieron a Coria a recebirlo por la Ciudad, el veinticuatro don Bartolomé Lopez de Mesa, y el veinticuatro don Pedro Galindo; y junto a la puente los recibió la Ciudad. Entró por la puerta de Triana, y fué al Alcázar, donde la Ciudad lo hospedó, y hizo la costa mientras estubo en Sevilla. Vido la Ciudad, y subió a la Torre. Lunes 27 de octubre de dicho año por la tarde, el dicho embaxador, con el dicho padre fray Luis Sotelo, entró en la Ciudad con el presente de su rey con toda la guardia, todos a caballo desde la puente. Dió su embaxada sentado al lado del asistente en su lengua, que interpretó el padre fray Luis Sotelo, y una carta de su rey, y una espada a su usanza, que se puso en el archibo de la Ciudad. Esta espada se conservó hasta la revolución del 68 que la chusma la robó. La embaxada para su magestad el rey don Felipe Tercero, nuestro señor, no trataba de religión, sino de amistad. (Biblioteca Capitular Calombina 84-7-19 .Memorias..., fol.195)")

The Japanese embassy met with King Philip III in Madrid on 30 January 1615. Hasekura remitted to the King a letter from Date Masamune, as well as offer for a treaty. The King responded that he would do what he could to accommodate these requests.

Hasekura was baptized on 17 February by the royal chaplain Diego de Guzmán in the Convent of Las Descalzas Reales, and renamed Felipe Francisco Hasekura in honor of the king and Sotelo's order. The baptism ceremony was to have been conducted by the Archbishop of Toledo, Bernardo de Sandoval y Rojas, though he was too ill to actually carry this out, and the Duke of Lerma—the main administrator of Phillip III's rule and the de facto ruler of Spain—was designated as Hasekura's godfather.

The embassy traveled across Spain during the summer of 1615 at royal expense. They eventually received permission to travel for Rome in August, and left at the beginning of the same month.

=== France ===
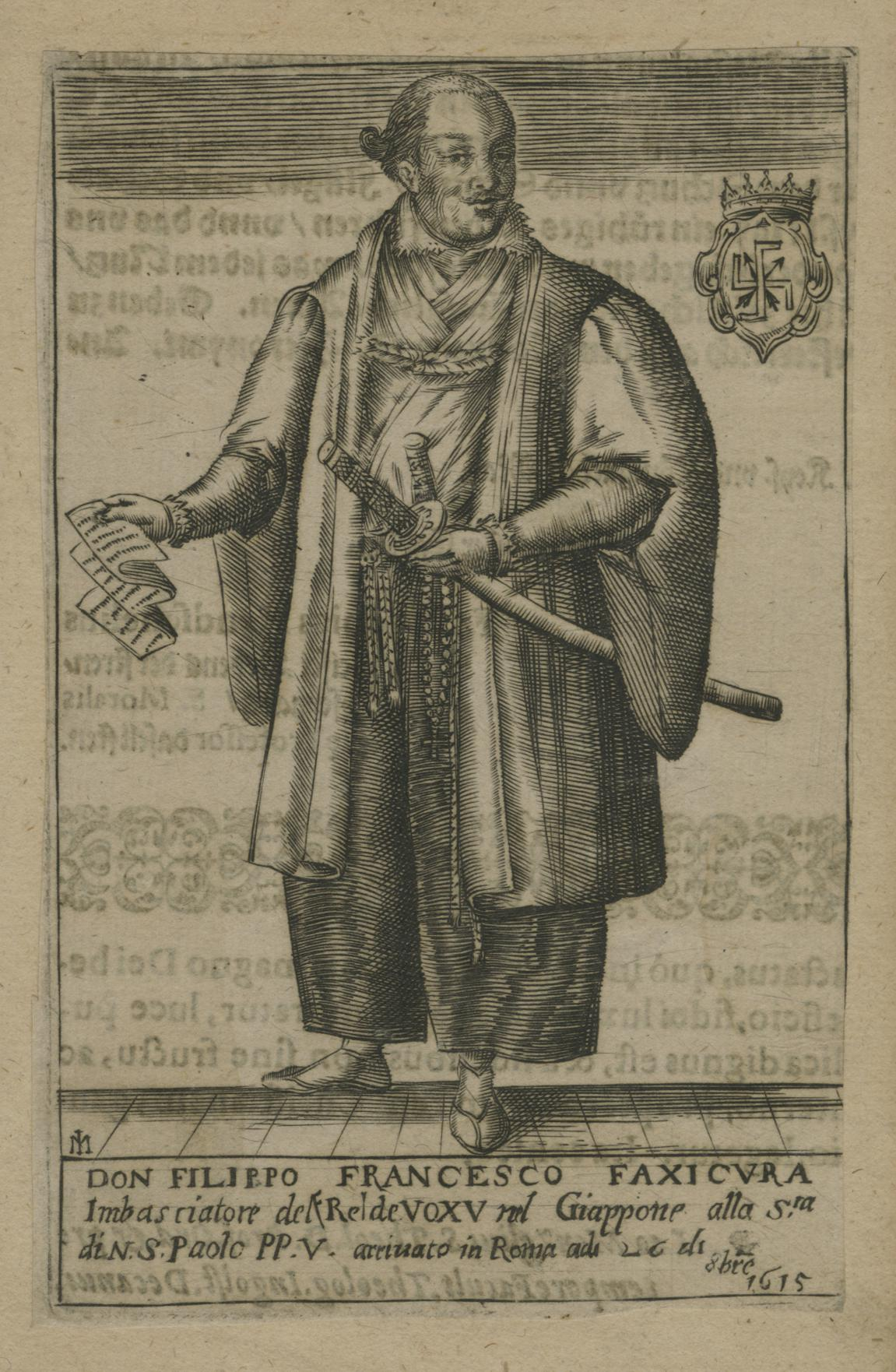
Depiction of Hasekura's visit in the 17th century of Scipione Amati's 1615 book, the History of the Kingdom of Woxu. Hasekura's coat of arms in the top right corner.

After traveling across Spain, the embassy sailed on the Mediterranean aboard three Spanish frigates towards Italy. Due to bad weather, they had to stay for a few days in the French harbour of Saint-Tropez, where they were received by the local nobility, and made quite a sensation on the populace.

The visit of the Japanese Embassy is recorded in the city's chronicles as led by "Philip Francis Faxicura, Ambassador to the Pope, from Date Masamune, Lord of the Sendai Domain, Mutsu Province, Japan".

Many picturesque details of their movements were recorded:

"They never touch food with their fingers, but instead use two small sticks that they hold with three fingers."
"They blow their noses in soft silky papers the size of a hand, which they never use twice, so that they throw them on the ground after usage, and they were delighted to see our people around them precipitate themselves to pick them up."
"Their swords cut so well that they can cut a soft paper just by putting it on the edge and by blowing on it." (Note: Extracts from the Old French original: "Il y huit jours qu'il passa a St Troppez un grand seigneur Indien, nomme Don Felipe Fransceco Faxicura, Ambassadeur vers le Pape, de la part de Idate Massamuni Roy de Woxu au Jappon, feudataire du grand Roy du Japon et de Meaco. Il avoit plus de trente personnes a sa suite, et entre autre, sept autres pages tous fort bien vetus et tous camuz, en sorte qu'ilz sembloyent presque tous freres. Ils avaient trois fregates fort lestes, lesuqelles portoient tout son attirail. Ils ont la teste rase, execpte une petite bordure sur le derrier faisant une flotte de cheveux sur la cime de la teste retroussee, et nouee a la Chinoise....". ("Relations of Mme de St Tropez", October 1615, Bibliothèque Inguimbertine, Carpentras); "...Ilz se mouchent dans des mouchoirs de papier de soye de Chine, de la grandeur de la main a peu prez, et ne se servent jamais deux fois d'un mouchoir, de sorte que toutes les fois qu'ilz ne mouchoyent, ils jestoyent leurs papiers par terre, et avoyent le plaisir de les voir ramasser a ceux de deca qui les alloyent voir, ou il y avoit grande presse du peuple qui s'entre batoit pour un ramasser principallement de ceux de l'Ambassadeur qui estoyent hystoriez par les bordz, comme les plus riches poulletz des dames de la Cour. Ils en portient quantite dans leur seign, et ils ont apporte provision suffisante pour ce long voyage, qu'ilz sont venus faire du deca....".; "... Le ses epees et dagues sont faictes en fasson de simmetterre tres peu courbe, et de moyenne longueur et sont sy fort tranchantz que y mettant un feuillet de papier et soufflant ilz couppent le papier, et encore de leur papier quy est beaucoup plus deslie que le notre et est faict de soye sur lesquels ils escrivent avec un pinceau.".; "... Quand ilz mangeoient ils ne touchent jamais leur chair sinon avec deux petits batons qu'ils tiennent avec trois doigts." (Marcouin, Francis and Keiko Omoto. Quand le Japon s'ouvrit au monde. Paris: Découvertes Gallimard, 1990. ISBN 2-07-053118-X. pp. 114–116))

The visit of Hasekura Tsunenaga to Saint-Tropez in 1615 is the first recorded instance of France–Japan relations.

=== Italy ===
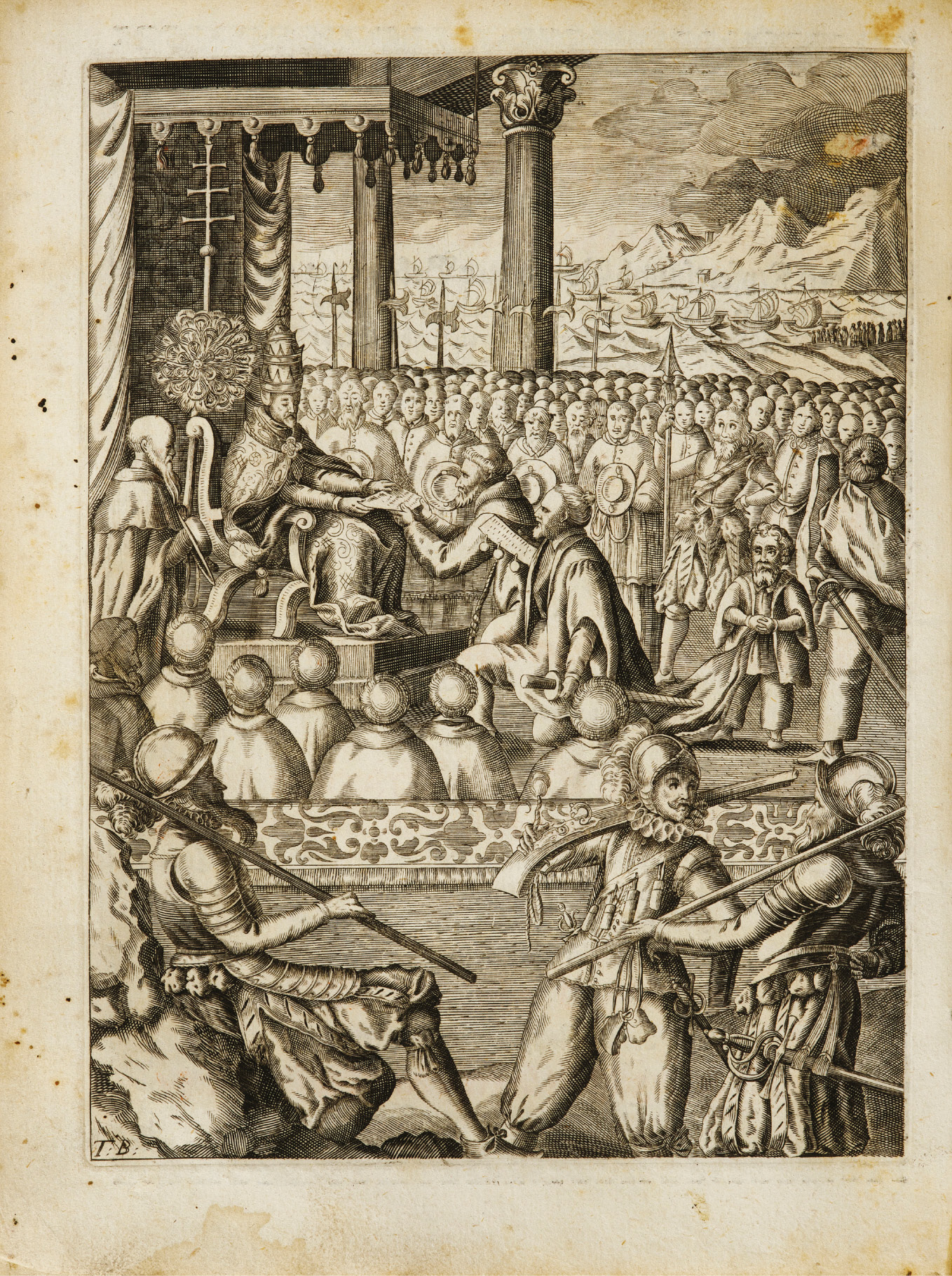
Hasekura and Luis Sotelo kneeling for an audience with Pope Paul V on November 3, 1615

The Japanese Embassy arrived at Rome on 20 September 1615 and was received by Cardinal Burgecio; the delegation met Pope Paul V on 3 November. Hasekura remitted to the Pope two gilded letters, one in Japanese and one in Latin, containing a request for a trade treaty between Japan and Mexico and the dispatch of Christian missionaries to Japan. These letters are still visible in the Vatican archives. The Latin letter, probably written by Luis Sotelo for Date Masamune, reads, in part:

Kissing the Holy feet of the Great, Universal, Most Holy Lord of The Entire World, Pope Paul, in profound submission and reverence, I, Idate Masamune, King of Wōshū in the Empire of Japan, suppliantly say:
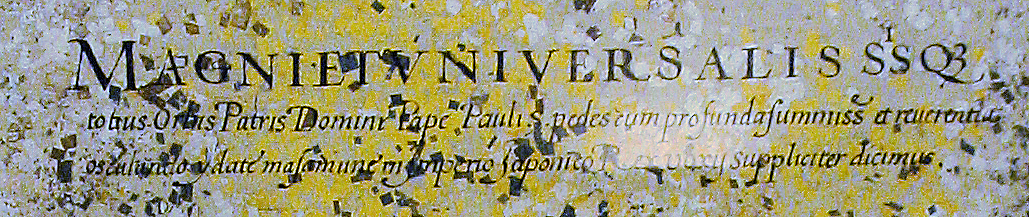
The Franciscan Padre Luis Sotelo came to our country to spread the faith of God. On that occasion, I learnt about this faith and desired to become a Christian, but I still haven't accomplished this desire due to some small issues. However, in order to encourage my subjects to become Christians, I wish that you send missionaries of the Franciscan church. I guarantee that you will be able to build a church and that your missionaries will be protected. I also wish that you select and send a bishop as well. Because of that, I have sent one of my samurai, Hasekura Rokuemon, as my representative to accompany Luis Sotelo across the seas to Rome, to give you a stamp of obedience and to kiss your feet. Further, as our country and Nueva España are neighbouring countries, could you intervene so that we can discuss with the King of Spain, for the benefit of dispatching missionaries across the seas." (Note: Translation of the Latin letter of Date Masamune to the Pope. Body of the text. Translation of the salutation was done separately. The original Latin of the introduction is as follows: Letter title MAGNI ET UNIVERSALIS SISQ3 [SISQ3 = Sanctissimique] totius Orbis Patris Domini Pape Pauli s. pedes cum profunda summisse et reuerentia [s. prob. = sanctos, summisse prob. = summissione] osculando ydate masamune * Imperio Japonico Rex voxu suppliciter dicimus.)

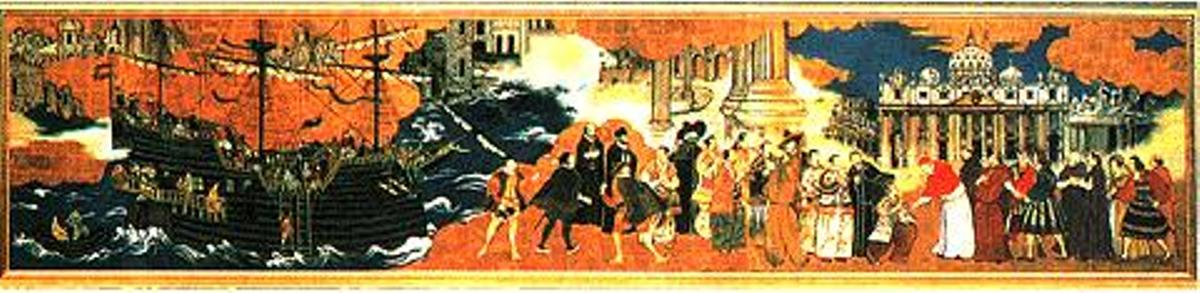
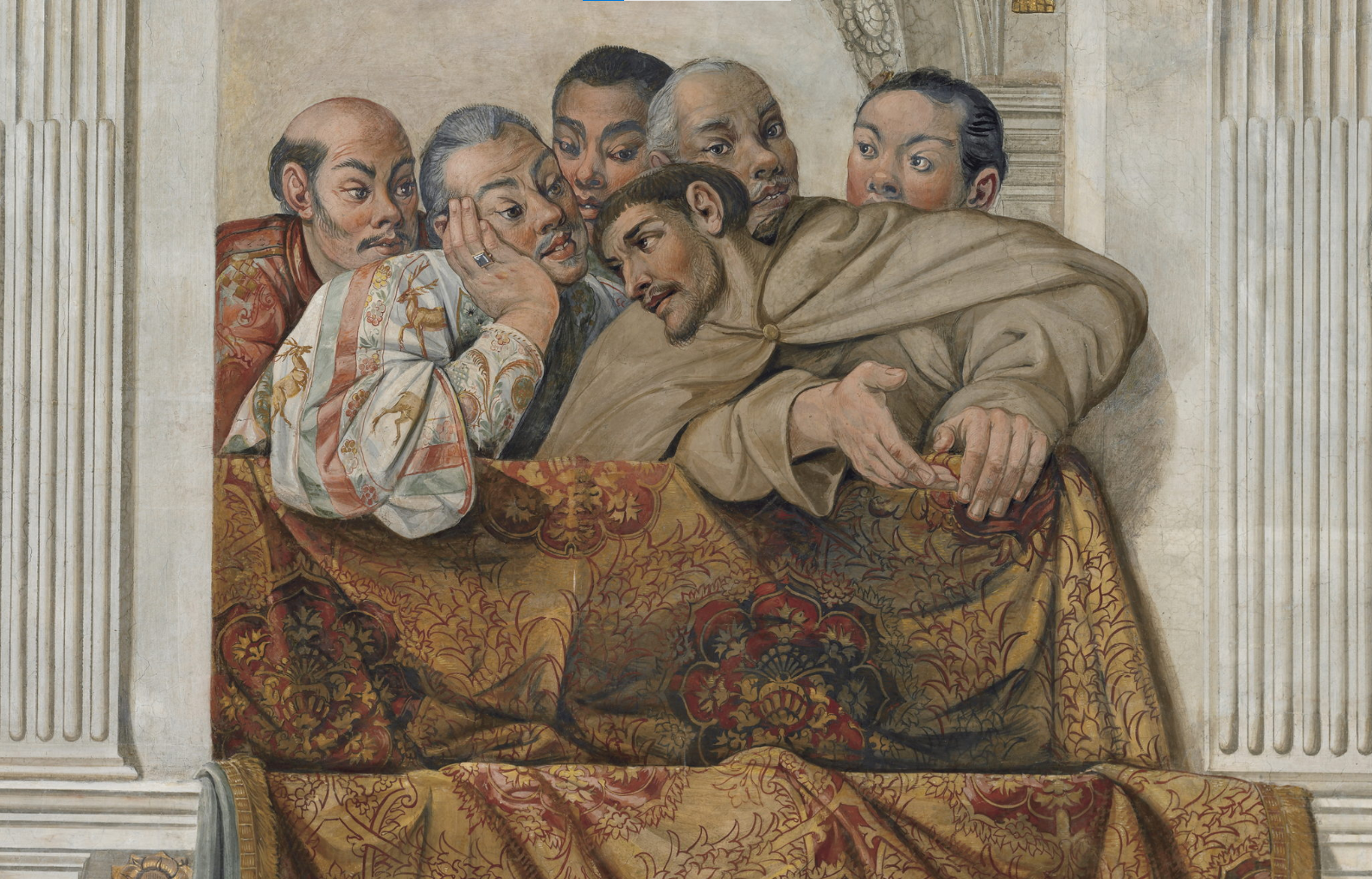
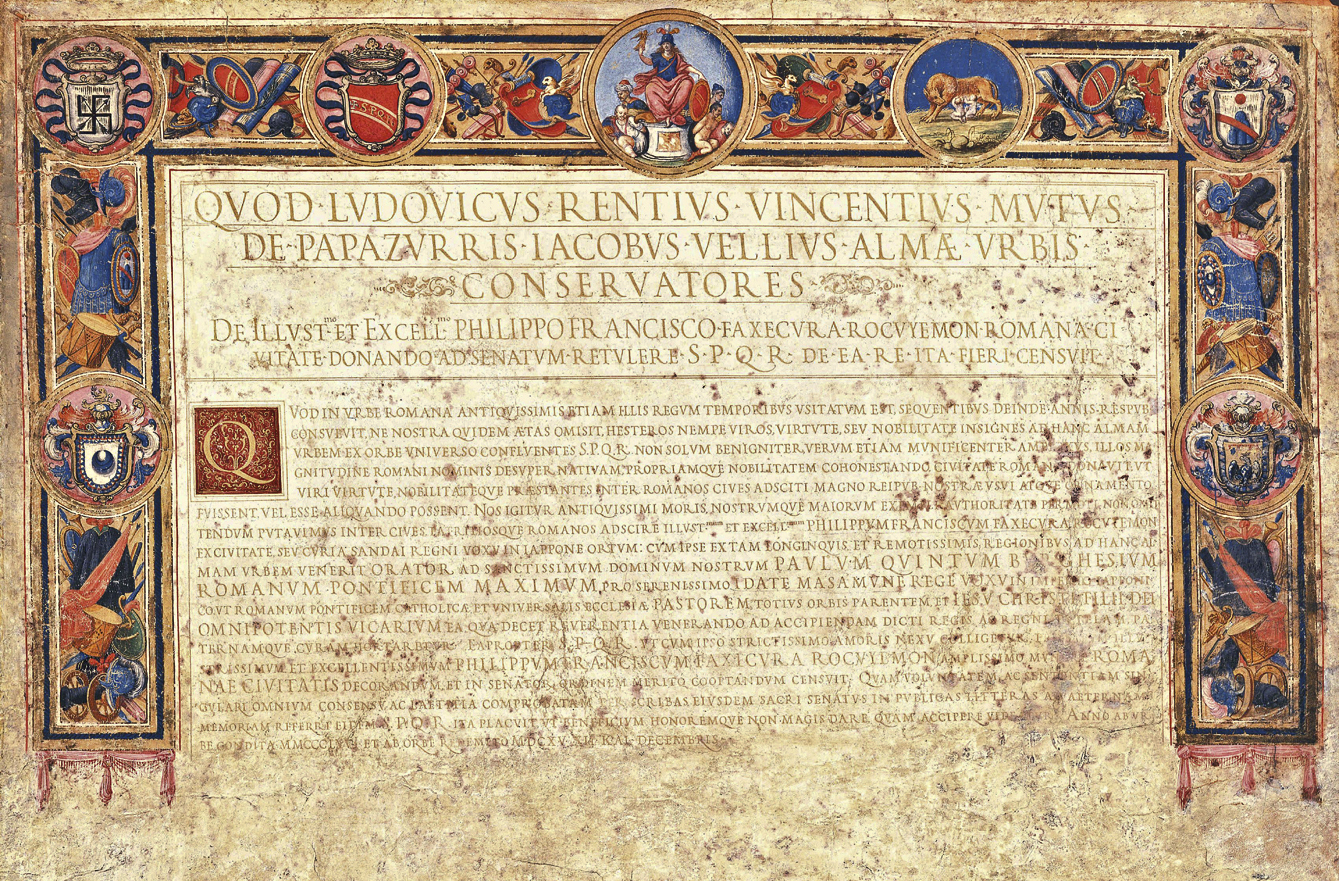
Top: Hasekura's embassy to the Pope in Rome in 1615. Japanese painting, 17th century.
Bottom (left to right): (a) Hasekura conversing with the Franciscan Luis Sotelo, surrounded by other members of the embassy, in a fresco showing the "glory of Pope Paul V". Sala Regia, Quirinal Palace, Rome, 1615.
(b) Title of Roman Noble and Roman Citizenship dedicated to "Faxecura Rokuyemon" (click image for transcription and translation).

The Pope agreed to the dispatch of missionaries, but left the decision for trade to the King of Spain.

The Roman Senate also gave to Hasekura the honorary title of Roman Noble and Roman Citizen, in a document he brought back to Japan, and which is preserved today in Sendai.

Sotelo also described the visit to the Pope, book De ecclesiae Iaponicae statu relatio (published posthumously in 1634):

"When we got there by the aid of God in the Year of Our Salvation 1615, not only were we kindly received by His Holiness the great Pope, with the Holy College of the Cardinals and a gathering of bishops and nobles, and even the joy and general happiness of the Roman People, but we and three others (whom the Japanese Christians had specially designated to announce their condition with respect to the Christian religion) were heard, rested, and just as we were hoping, dispatched as quickly as possible." (Note: Quo tandem cum anno Salutis 1615. iuvante deo pervenissemus, à SS. Papa magno cum Cardinalium Sacri Collegij Antistitum ac Nobilium concursu, nec non & Rom. populi ingenti lætitia & communi alacritate non modo benignè excepti, verùm & humanissimè tam nos quam etiã tres alij, quos Iaponii Christiani, quatenus eorum circa Christianam Religionem statum Apostolicis auribus intimarent, specialiter destinaverant, auditi, recreati, & prout optabamus, quantocyus expediti. (p. 1))

=== Rumours of political intrigue ===
Besides the official description of Hasekura's visit to Rome, some contemporary communications tend to indicate that political matters were also discussed, and that an alliance with Date Masamune was suggested as a way to establish Christian influence in the whole of Japan:

"The Ambassador strongly insisted that the authority and power of his ruler was superior to that of many European countries" (Anonymous Roman communication, dated 10 October 1615)
"The Franciscan Spanish fathers are explaining that the King of the Ambassador [Hasekura Tsunenaga] will soon become the supreme ruler of his country, and that, not only will they become Christians and follow the will of the church of Rome, but they will also in turn convert the rest of the population. This is why they are requesting the dispatch of a high ecclesiastic together with the missionaries. Because of this, many people have been doubting the true purpose of the embassy, and are wondering if they are not looking for some other benefit." (Letter of the Venetian ambassador, 7 November 1615).

=== Second visit to Spain ===
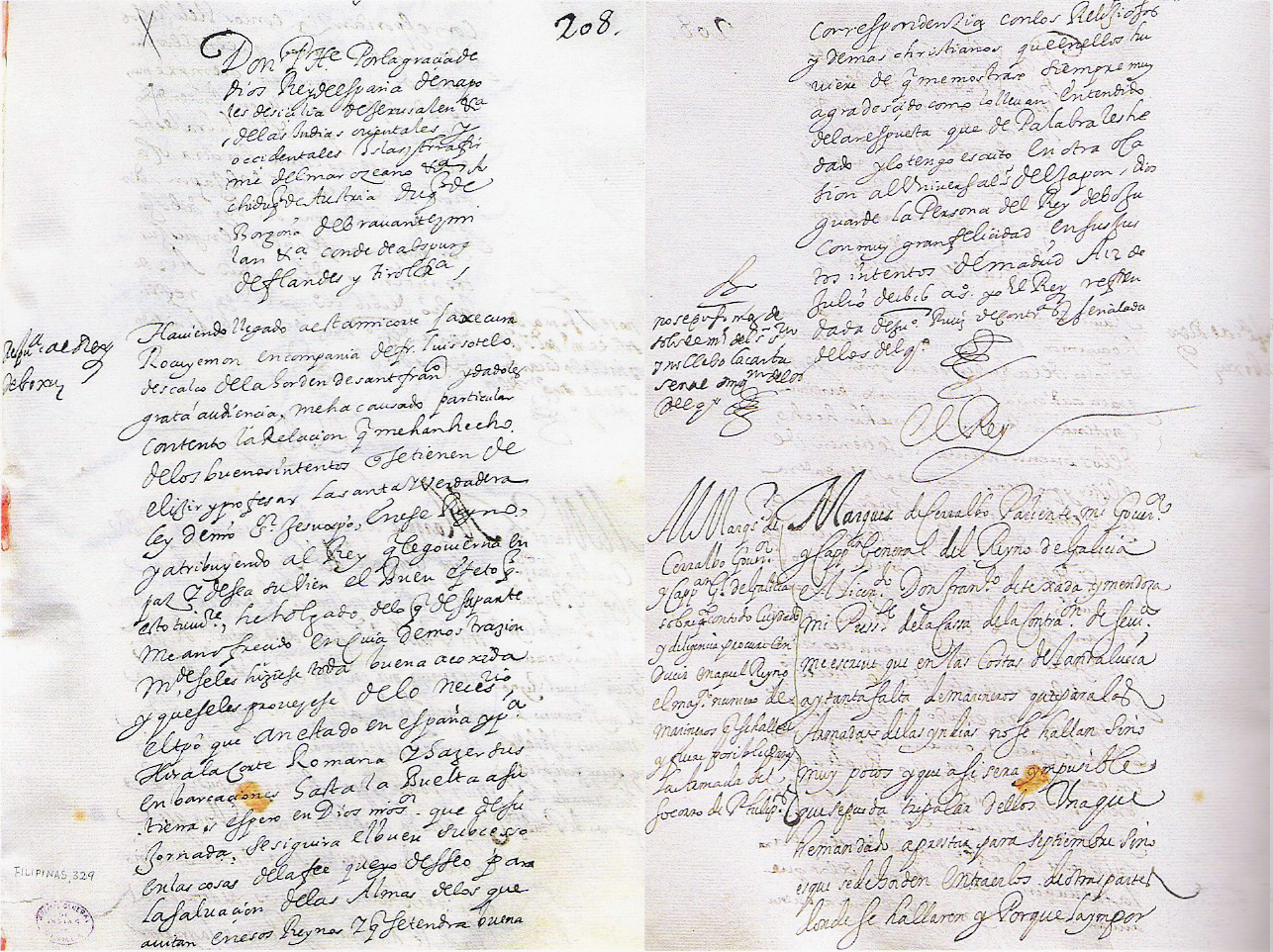
Letter of the King of Spain to Date Masamune (1616). The letter is friendly and asks for the support of the Christian faith, but does not mention trade, in spite of Date Masamune's own request (draft, preserved in the Seville archives, General Archive of the Indies).

For the second time in Spain, in April 1616 Hasekura met again with the King, who declined to sign a trade agreement, on the ground that the Japanese Embassy did not appear to be an official embassy from the ruler of Japan Tokugawa Ieyasu, who, on the contrary, had promulgated an edict in January 1614 ordering the expulsion of all missionaries from Japan, and started the persecution of the Christian faith in Japan.

Two years later, after their trip around Europe, the mission left Seville for New Spain (Mexico) in June 1616. Certain registration documents indicate that some Japanese could have stayed in Spain, which is possible given that they made their last stop in villages near Seville (Espartinas and Coria del Río). In modern Spain, there are families with "Japón" as a surname.

=== Western publications on Hasekura's embassy ===
The embassy of Hasekura Tsunenaga was the subject of numerous publications throughout Europe. The Italian writer Scipione Amati, who accompanied the embassy in 1615 and 1616, published in 1615 in Rome a book titled History of the Kingdom of Woxu. This book was also translated into German in 1617. In 1616, the French publisher Abraham Savgrain published an account of Hasekura's visit to Rome: "Récit de l'entrée solemnelle et remarquable faite à Rome, par Dom Philippe Francois Faxicura" ("Account of the solemn and remarkable entrance in Rome of Dom Philippe Francois Faxicura").

=== Return to Mexico ===
Hasekura stayed in Mexico for 5 months on his way back to Japan. The San Juan Bautista had been waiting in Acapulco since 1616, after a second trip across the Pacific from Japan to Mexico. Captained by Yokozawa Shōgen, the ship was laden with fine pepper and lacquerware from Kyoto, which were sold on the Mexican market. To avoid too much silver leaving Mexico for Japan, the Spanish king requested that the Viceroy ask for the proceeds to be spent on Mexican goods, except for an amount of 12,000 pesos and 8,000 pesos in silver, which Hasekura and Yokozawa respectively were allowed to bring back with them.

=== Philippines ===
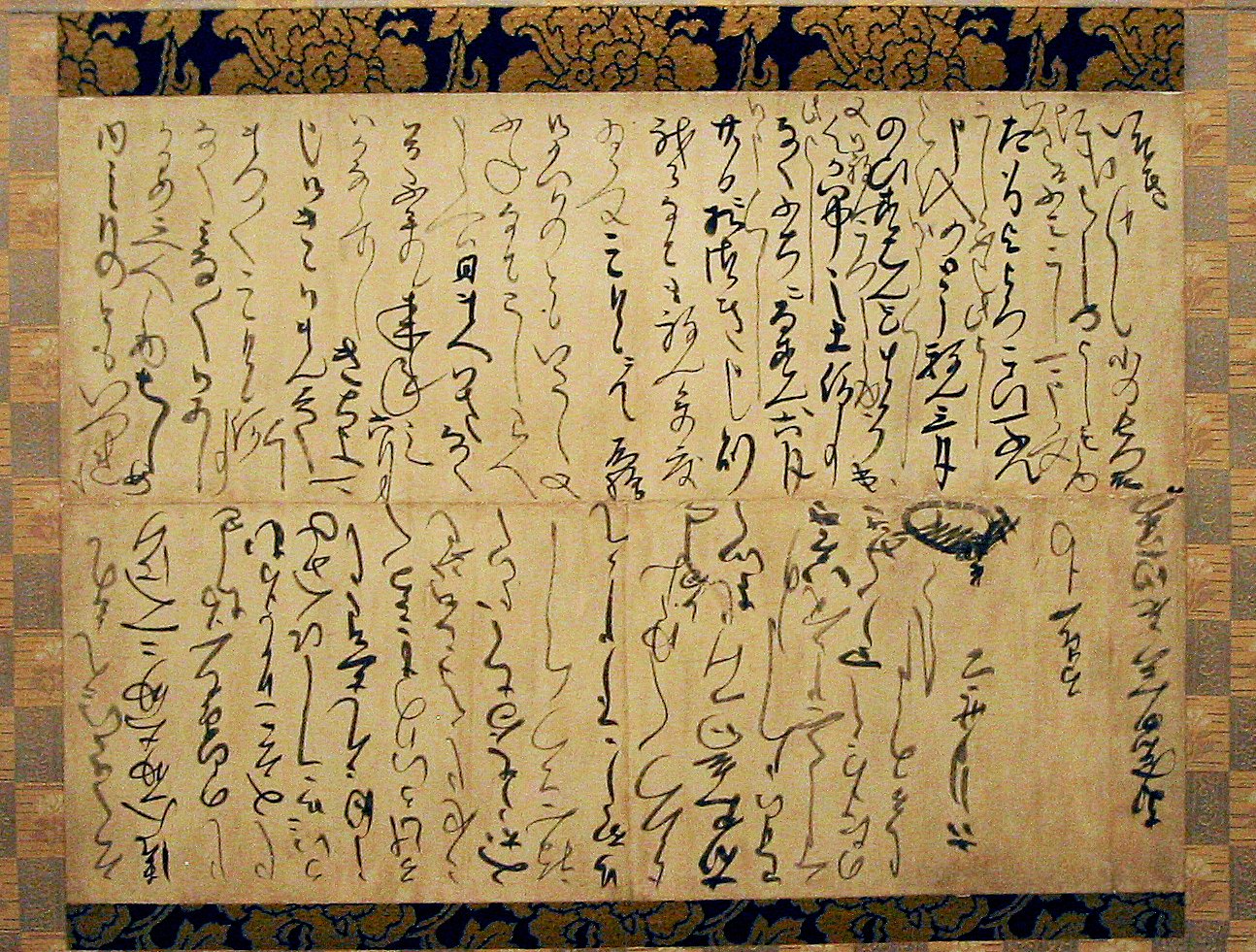
Letter of Hasekura to his son, written during his stay in the Philippines, Sendai City Museum

In April 1618, the San Juan Bautista arrived in the Philippines from Mexico, with Hasekura and Luis Sotelo on board. The ship was acquired by the Spanish government there, with the objective of building up defenses against incursions from Protestant powers. In Manila, the archbishop described the deal to the king of Spain in a missive dated 28 July 1619:

"The Governor was extremely friendly with the Japanese, and provided them with his protection. As they had many expensive things to buy, they decided to lend their ship. The ship was immediately furbished for combat. The Governor eventually bought the ship, because it turned out that it was of excellent and sturdy construction, and available ships were dramatically few. In favour of your Majesty, the price paid was reasonable." (Document 243)

During his stay in the Philippines, Hasekura purchased numerous goods for Date Masamune, and built a ship, as he explained in a letter he wrote to his son. He finally returned to Japan in August 1620, reaching the harbour of Nagasaki.

== Return to Japan ==
By the time Hasekura came back, Japan had changed quite drastically: an effort to eradicate Christianity had been under way since 1614, Tokugawa Ieyasu had died in 1616 and been replaced by his more xenophobic son Tokugawa Hidetada, and Japan was moving towards the "Sakoku" policy of isolation. Because news of these persecutions arrived in Europe during Hasekura's embassy, European rulers – especially the King of Spain – became very reluctant to respond favorably to Hasekura's trade and missionary proposals.

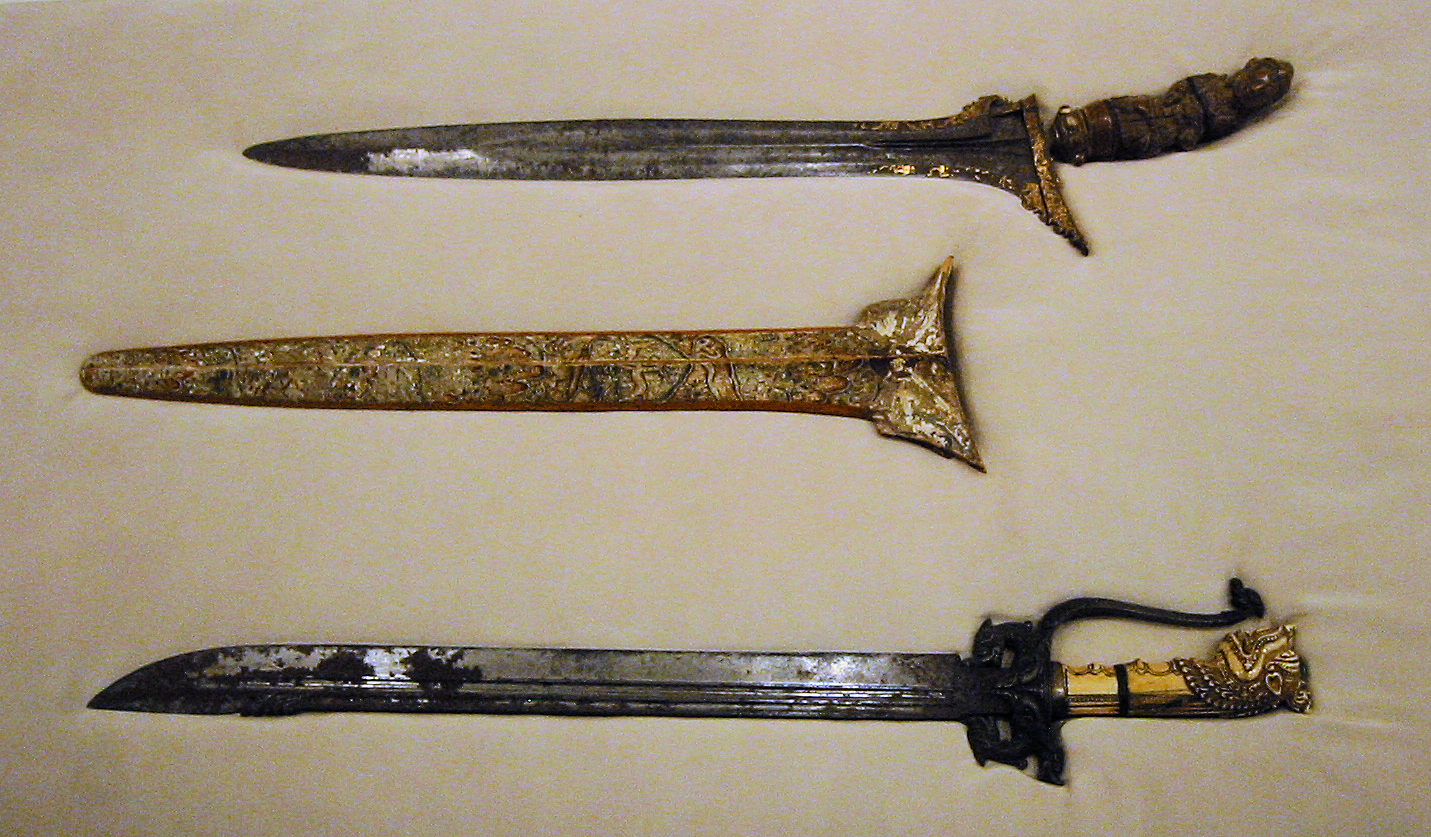
Malay/Indonesian kris and Ceylonese dagger (acquired in the Philippines), presented by Hasekura to Date Masamune upon his return; Sendai City Museum

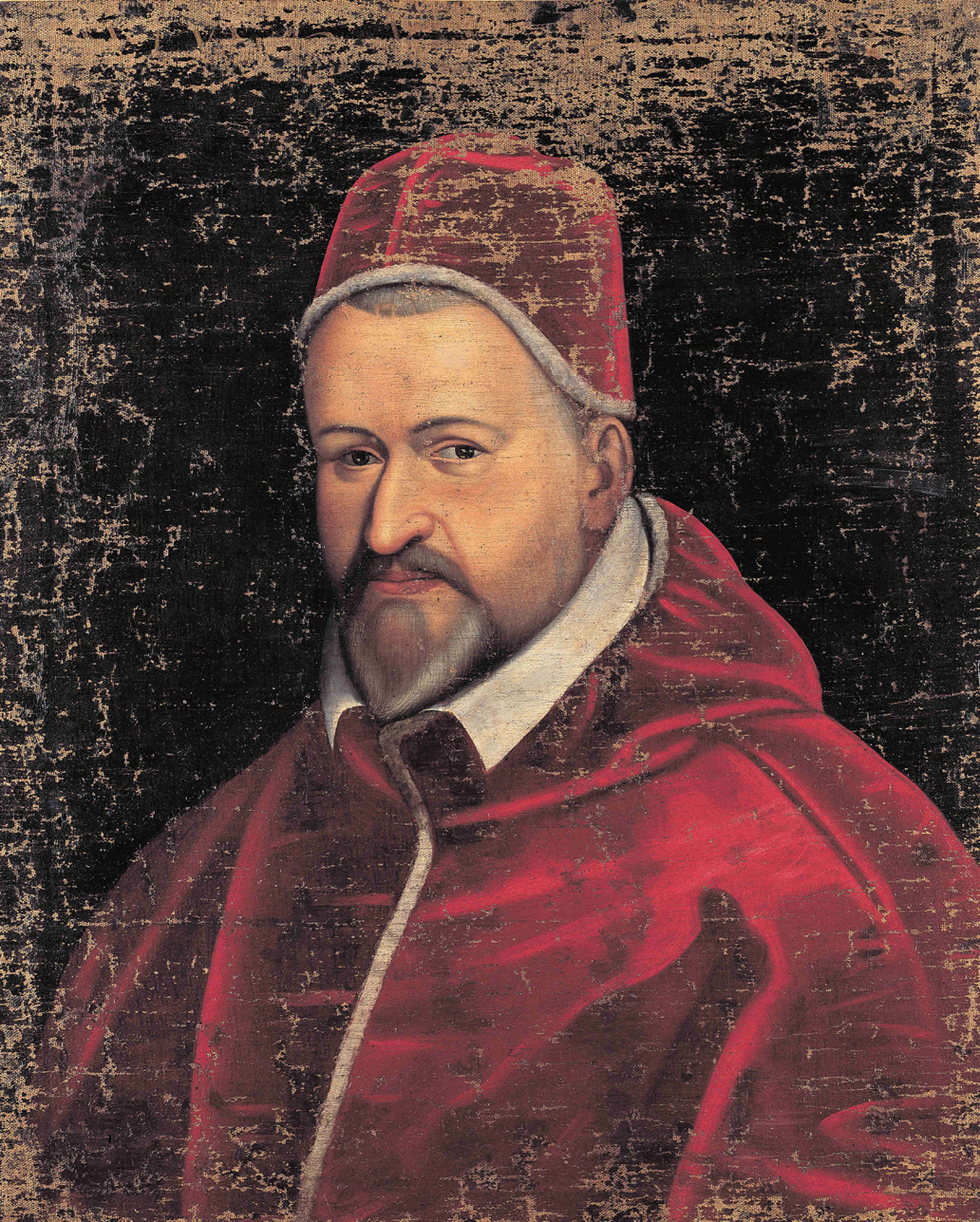
Painting of the Pope Paul V remitted by Hasekura Tsunenaga to Date Masamune during his 1620 report; Sendai City Museum

Hasekura reported his travels to Date Masamune upon his arrival in Sendai. It is recorded that he remitted a portrait of Pope Paul V, a portrait of himself in prayer (shown above), and a set of Ceylonese and Malay/Indonesian daggers acquired in the Philippines, all preserved today in the Sendai City Museum. The "Records of the House of Masamune" describe his report in a rather succinct manner, ending with a rather cryptic expression of surprise bordering on the outrage ("奇怪最多シ") at Hasekura's discourse:

"Rokuemon went to the country of the Southern Barbarians, he paid his respects to the king Paolo, he stayed there for several years, and now he sailed back from Luzon. He brought paintings of the king of the Southern Barbarians, and a painting of himself, which he remitted. Many of his descriptions of the Southern Barbarian countries, and the meaning of Rokuemon's declarations were surprising and extraordinary."

=== Interdiction of Christianity in Sendai ===
The direct effect of Hasekura's return to Sendai was the interdiction of Christianity in the Sendai fief two days later:

"Two days after the return of Rokuemon to Sendai, a three-point edict against the Christian was promulgated: first, that all Christians were ordered to abandon their faith, in accordance with the rule of the shōgun, and for those who did not, they would be exiled if they were nobles, and killed if they were citizens, peasants or servants. Second, that a reward would be given for the denunciation of hidden Christians. Third that propagators of the Christian faith should leave the Sendai fief, or else, abandon their religion".

What Hasekura said or did to bring about such a result is unknown. As later events tend to indicate that he and his descendants remained faithful Christians, Hasekura may have made an enthusiastic – and to a certain extent, disturbing – account of the greatness and might of Western countries and the Christian religion. He may also have encouraged an alliance between the Church and Date Masamune to take over the country (an idea advertised by the Franciscans while in Rome), which, in 1620 Japan, would have been a totally unrealistic proposition. Lastly, hopes of trade with Spain evaporated when Hasekura communicated that the Spanish King would not enter an agreement as long as persecutions were occurring in the rest of the country.

Date Masamune suddenly chose to distance himself from the Western faith. The first executions of Christians started 40 days later. The anti-Christian measures taken by Date Masumune were, however, comparatively mild, and Japanese and Western Christians repeatedly claimed that he only took them to appease the shōgun:

"Date Masumune, out of fear of the shōgun, ordered the persecution of Christianity in his territory, and created several martyrs." (Letter of 17 prominent Japanese Christians from Sendai, to the Pope, 29 September 1621).

One month after Hasekura's return, Date Masamune wrote a letter to the shōgun Tokugawa Hidetada, in which he makes a very clear effort to evade responsibility for the embassy, explaining in detail how it was organized with the approval, and even the collaboration, of the shōgun:

"When I sent a ship to the Southern Barbarian countries several years ago, upon the advice of Mukai Shōgen, I also dispatched the Southern Barbarian named Sotelo, who had resided for several years in Edo. At that time, your highness also gave messages for the Southern Barbarians, as well as presents, such as folding screens and sets of armour."

Spain, with a colony and an army in the nearby Philippines, was a source of concern for Japan at that time. Hasekura's eyewitness accounts of Spanish power and colonial methods in New Spain (Mexico) may have precipitated the shōgun Tokugawa Hidetada's decision to sever trade relations with Spain in 1623, and diplomatic relations in 1624, although other events such as the smuggling of Spanish priests into Japan and a failed Spanish embassy also contributed to the decision.

=== Death ===
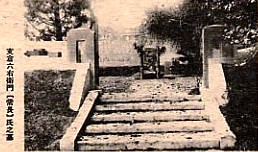
The Buddhist grave of Hasekura Tsunenaga, still visible today in Enfuku-ji, 〒 989-1507 Miyagi Prefecture, Iwata-gun, Kawasaki Town (Enchōzan, Miyagi)

What became of Hasekura is unknown and accounts of his last years are numerous. Contemporary Christian commentators could rely only on hearsay, with some rumours stating that he abandoned Christianity, others that he was martyred for his faith, and others that he practised Christianity in secret. The fate of his descendants and servants, who were later executed for being Christians, suggests that Hasekura remained strongly Christian and transmitted his faith to the members of his family.

Sotelo, who returned to Japan but was caught and finally burnt at the stake in 1624, gave before his execution an account of Hasekura returning to Japan as a hero who propagated the Christian faith:

"My other colleague, the ambassador Philippus Faxecura, after he reached his aforementioned king (Date Masamune), was greatly honored by him, and sent to his own estate, to rest after such a long and tiring journey, where he made his wife, children, servants, and many other vassals into Christians, and advised other nobles who were his kith and kin to accept the faith, which they indeed did. While he was engaged in these and other pious works, a full year after his return, having provided much instruction and a great example, with much preparation, he piously passed on, leaving for his children by a special inheritance the propagation of the faith in his estate, and the protection of the religious (i.e. "members of religious orders") in that kingdom. The King and all the nobles were greatly saddened by his passing, but especially the Christians and Religious, who knew very well the virtue and religious zeal of this man. This is what I heard by letters from the very Religious who administered the sacraments to him, and who had been present at his death, as well as from others." (Note: Collega alter legatus Philippus Fiaxecura [sic] postquam ad prædictum Regem suum pervenit, ab ipso valdè est honoratus, & in proprium statum missus, ut tam longâ viâ fessus reficeretur, ubi uxorem, filios, domesticos cum multis aliis vasallis Christianos effecit, aliisque nobilibus hominibus consanguineis & propinquis suasit ut fidem reciperent; quam utique receperunt. Dum in his & aliis piis operibus exerceretur ante annum completum post eius regressum magna cum omnium ædificatione & exemplo, multa cum præparatione suis filiis hæreditate præcipua fidei propagationem in suo statu, & Religiosorum in eo regno pretectionem commendatam relinquens, pie defunctus est. De cuius discessu Rex & omnes Nobiles valdè doluerunt, præcipuè tamen Christiani & Religiosi, qui huius viri virtutem & fidei Zelum optimè noverant. Ab ipsis Religiosis, qui eidem sacramenta ministrarunt, eiusque obitui interfuerant; & ab aliis sic per literas accepi. (p. 16))

Hasekura also brought back to Japan several Catholic artifacts, but he did not give them to his ruler, and instead kept them on his own estate.

Hasekura Tsunenaga died of illness (according to Japanese as well as Christian sources) in 1622, but the location of his grave is not known for certain. Three graves are claimed as Hasekura's in Miyagi. The most likely is in the outskirts of Ōsato town (大郷町) in the temple of Saikō-ji (西光寺). Another is visible in the Buddhist temple of Enfuku-ji (円福寺) in Kawasaki town. Another is clearly marked (along with a memorial to Sotelo) in the cemetery of the temple of Kōmyō-ji (光明寺) in Kitayama Aoba-ku (Sendai).

=== Execution of his descendants and servants ===
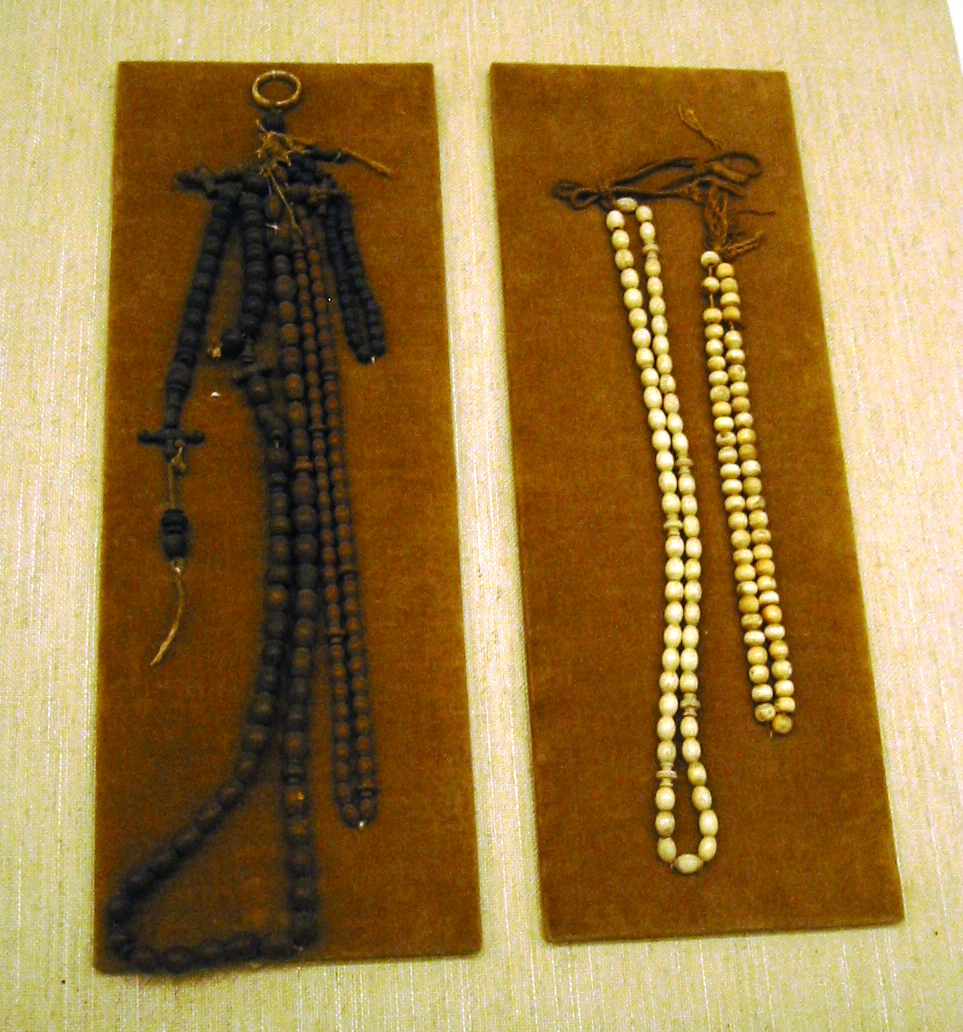
Rosaries found in Hasekura's estate in 1640

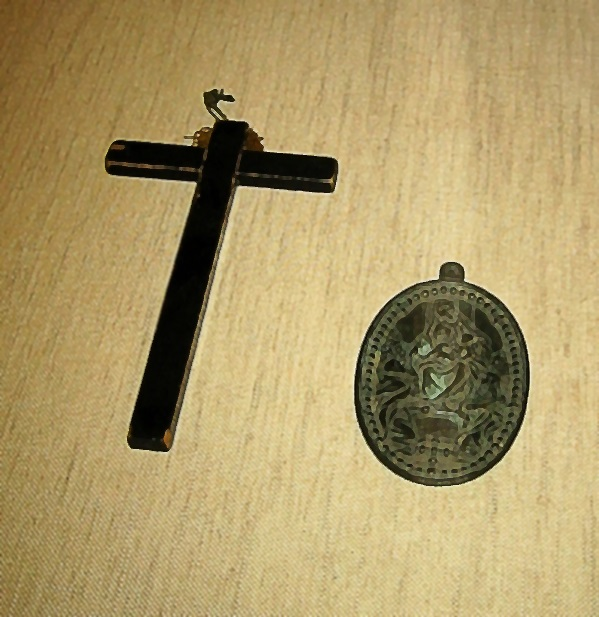
Cross and medal seized in Hasekura's estate in 1640

Hasekura had a son, named Rokuemon Tsuneyori. Two of his son's servants, Yogoemon (与五右衛門) and his wife, were convicted of being Christian but refused to recant their faith under torture (reverse hanging, called "tsurushi") and as a result died in August 1637. In 1637, Rokuemon Tsuneyori himself also came under suspicion of Christianity after being denounced by someone from Edo, but escaped questioning because he was the master of the Zen temple of Komyoji (光明寺).

In 1640, two other servants of Tsuneyori, Tarōzaemon (太郎左衛門, 71), who had followed Hasekura to Rome, and his wife (59), were convicted of being Christians, and, also refusing to recant their faith under torture, died. Tsuneyori was held responsible this time and decapitated the same day, at the age of 42, for having failed to denounce Christians under his roof, although it remained unconfirmed whether he was himself Christian or not. Two Christian priests, the Dominican Pedro Vazquez and Joan Bautista Paulo, had given his name under torture. Tsuneyori's younger brother, Tsunemichi, was convicted as a Christian, but managed to flee and disappear.

The privileges of the Hasekura family were abolished at this point by the Sendai fief, and their property and belongings seized. It is at this time, in 1640, that Hasekura's Christian artifacts were confiscated, and they were kept in custody in Sendai until they were rediscovered at the end of the 19th century.

Altogether, around fifty Christian artifacts were found in Hasekura's estate in 1640, such as crosses, rosaries, religious gowns, and religious paintings. The artifacts were seized and stored by the Date fief. An inventory was made again in 1840 describing the items as belonging to Hasekura Tsunenaga. Nineteen books were also mentioned in the inventory, but they have been lost since. The artifacts are today preserved in the Sendai City Museum and other museums in Sendai.

Tsuneyori's son, Tsunenobu (常信), grandson of Tsunenaga Hasekura, survived. He founded a Hasekura family line that continues to the present day. The first to 10th heads of the Hasekura Family lived in Osato-city, Miyagi Prefecture. The 11th head moved to Wakabayashi Ward, Sendai City, Miyagi Prefecture where the present 13th head, Tsunetaka Hasekura, resides. The 13th head actively works in both Miyagi and Akita Prefectures.

== Legacy ==
The very existence of the travels of Hasekura was forgotten in Japan until the reopening of the country after the Sakoku policy of isolation. In 1873, a Japanese embassy to Europe (the Iwakura mission) headed by Iwakura Tomomi heard for the first time of the travels of Hasekura when shown documents during their visit to Venice in Italy.

There are statues of Hasekura Tsunenaga in the outskirts of Acapulco in Mexico, at the entrance of Havana Bay in Cuba, in Coria del Río in Spain, in the Church of Civitavecchia in Italy, in Tsukinoura, near Ishinomaki, and two in Osato town in Miyagi. Approximately 700 inhabitants of Coria del Río bear the surname Japón (originally Hasekura de Japón), identifying them as descendants of the members of Hasekura Tsunenaga's delegation. A theme park describing the embassy and displaying a replica of the San Juan Bautista was established in the harbour of Ishinomaki, from which Hasekura initially departed on his voyage.

=== Works based on his life ===
Shūsaku Endō wrote a 1980 novel, titled The Samurai, a fictitious account relating the travels of Hasekura. A 2005 animation film, produced in Spain and titled Gisaku, relates the adventures of a young Japanese samurai named Yohei who visited Spain in the 17th century, in a story loosely taking its inspiration from the travels of Hasekura. Yohei survived in hiding to the present day due to magical powers ("After centuries of lethargy, he awakes in a World he does not know"), and accomplishes many adventures in modern Europe as a superhero.

The 2017 fictional historical novel The Samurai of Seville by John J. Healey recounts the travels of Hasekura and his delegation of 21 samurai. A 2019 sequel entitled The Samurai's Daughter tells the story of a young woman born to one of the samurai and a Spanish lady, and her journey to Japan with her father following her mother's death.

The 2018 French documentary Un samouraï au Vatican, directed by Stéphane Bégoin, chronicles the travels of the diplomatic mission to Europe led by Hasekura Tsunenaga. Subsequently, in 2021 an edited version of the documentary aired as the 5th episode of the 19th season of the PBS documentary TV series Secrets of the Dead.

== See also ==
- Bernardo the Japanese, the first Japanese to visit Europe, in 1553.
- William Adams, the first Englishman who traveled to Japan
- Edo period
- France–Asia relations
- France–Japan relations
- Nanban trade
- Tenshō embassy (天正遣欧少年使節) – a preceding embassy sent by Japanese daimyos (warlords) to Europe in the 1580s.
  - Itō Mancio – leader of the Tenshō embassy.

== Works cited ==
- Boxer, C.R. (1993). The Christian Century in Japan, 1549–1650. Berkeley: University of California Press. ISBN 1-85754-035-2.
- Chimalpahin Quauhtlehuanitzin, Don Domingo de San Antón Muñón (2006). Lockhart, James; Schroeder, Susan; Namala, Doris (eds.). Annals of His Time. Stanford, California: Stanford University Press. ISBN 0-8047-5454-3.
- de Cardona, Nicolás (1974). Mathes, W. Michael (ed.). Geographic and Hydrographic Descriptions of Many Northern and Southern Lands and Seas in the Indies, Specifically of the Discovery of the Kingdom of California. Berkeley, California: University of California Press. ISBN 0-87093-235-7.
- Endo, Shusaku (April 1997). The Samurai (reprint ed.). New Directions Publishing. ISBN 0-8112-1346-3. A fictional account of Hasekura's expedition.
- Gonoi, Takashi (March 2003). 支倉常長 [Hasekura Tsunenaga] (in Japanese). 吉川弘文館. ISBN 4-642-05227-5.
- Hayes, Derek (2001). Historical Atlas of the North Pacific Ocean: Maps of Discovery and Scientific Exploration, 1500–2000. Seattle, Washington: Sasquatch Books. ISBN 978-1-57061-311-1.
- Lee, Christina H. (2008). "The Perception of the Japanese in Early Modern Spain: Not Quite 'The Best People Yet Discovered'" (PDF). EHumanista. 11: 358–359.
- Marcouin, Francis; Omoto, Keiko (1990). Quand le Japon s'ouvrit au monde. Découvertes Gallimard (in French). Paris: Gallimard. ISBN 2-07-053118-X.
- Mathes, W. Michael (1990). "A Quarter Century of Trans-Pacific Diplomacy: New Spain and Japan, 1592–1617". Journal of Asian History. 24 (1): 1–29. ISSN 0021-910X. JSTOR 41925377.
- Soteli, Ludovici (1634). De Ecclesiæ Iaponicæ statu Relatio, Imperatoris Augusti, Principum, Electorum, omniumque statuum Imperii cuiusque Ordinis lectione digna (in Latin).
- Historia del regno di voxu del Giapone, dell'antichita, nobilta, e valore del suo re Idate Masamune, delli favori, c'ha fatti alla Christianità, e desiderio che tiene d'esser Christiano e dell'aumento di nostra santa Fede in quelle parti (in Italian). Rome: Giacomo Mascardi, under license from his Superiors. 1615.
- 国宝「慶長遣欧使節関係資料」 [National Treasure: Documents Related to the Keichō Embassy to Europe] (in Japanese). Sendai City Museum. October 2001. p. 91.
- 世界と日本ー天正・慶長の使節 [The World and Japan – Tensho and Keicho Embassies] (in Japanese). Sendai City Museum. 1995.
- "南蛮国ノ物事、六右衛門物語ノ趣、奇怪最多シ". 伊達治家記録 [House Records of the Date Administration] (in Japanese).
- 伊達世臣家譜略記 [An Abridged Date Era Retainer Genealogy] (in Japanese). National Diet Library Digital Collection.
