= Mukai Shōgen Tadakatsu =

Japanese samurai (1582–1641)

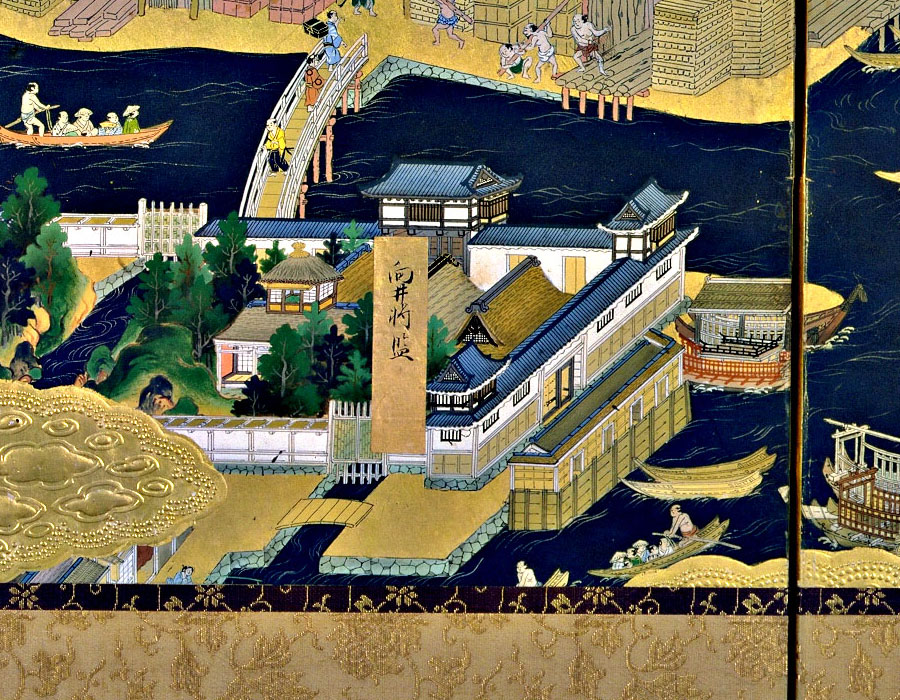
The residence of Mukai Shogen in Edo, 17th century screen.

Mukai Tadakatsu (向井 忠勝, 1582–1641), more generally known as Mukai Shōgen (向井 将監), was the Admiral of the fleet (Jp:お船手奉行) for the Shōgun Tokugawa Ieyasu during the beginning of the Edo period, in the early 17th century.

Between 1604 and 1606, under the order of Tokugawa Ieyasu, Mukai Shogen, who was Commander in Chief of the Navy of Uraga, built Japan's first Western sailship together with William Adams and carpenters from the city of Itō. The ship was 80 tons, and allowed them to survey Japanese coasts. A second, larger ship of 120 tons, capable of sailing on the high seas was again ordered by Tokugawa Ieyasu. She was later lent in 1610 to a Spanish embassy, and crossed the Pacific Ocean. She was named by the Spanish San Buena Ventura.

He is then recorded as having participated to the preparation of the embassy of Hasekura Tsunenaga to America and Europe in 1613, by giving his support to the mission and supplying his Chief Carpenter for the building of the San Juan Bautista.

He is also reported by Richard Cocks, head of the English Factory in Hirado, to have discussed with him and William Adams an invasion of the Philippines by Japanese forces in 1616.
