= Tanaka Shōsuke =

Japanese trader and diplomat

Tanaka Shōsuke (田中 勝介) was a Japanese merchant in the early Edo period. He is the first recorded Japanese to have travelled to the Americas in 1610 (although some Japanese, such as Christopher and Cosmas, are known to have sailed across the Pacific on Spanish galleons as early as 1587). Returning to Japan in 1611, he again went to North America in 1613, with the embassy of Hasekura Tsunenaga. In total, he accomplished two round trips between Japan and North America and helped establish trade and diplomatic relations between Japan and the Spanish Empire. According to Sumpu-ki, he was a representative of the great Osaka merchant Gotō Shōsaburō.

== Background ==
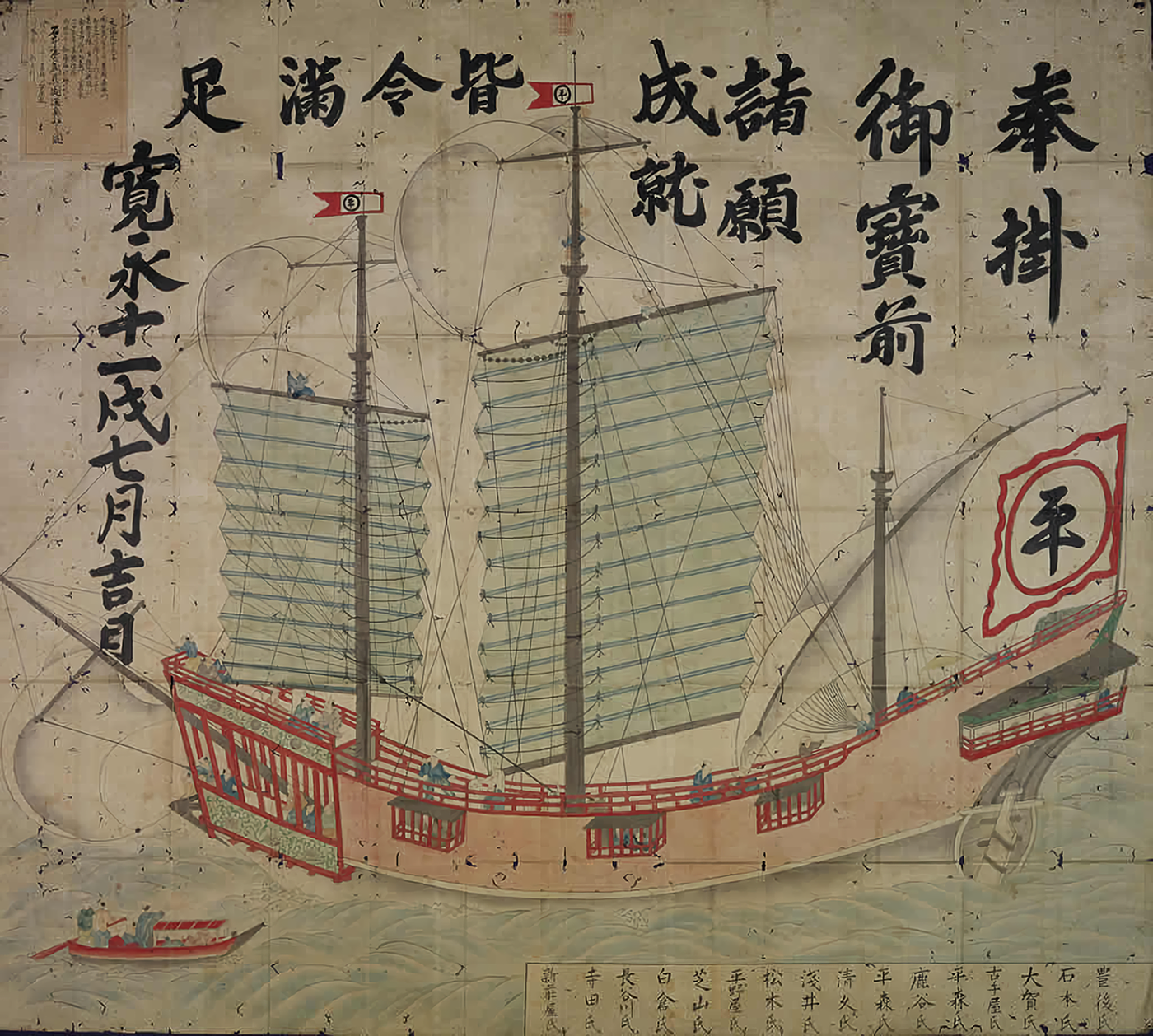
Japanese "Red seal ships" were used for Asian commerce during the first part of the 17th century

Before the travels of Tanaka Shōsuke, Japan had few contacts with the Spanish, and had instead relied upon the Portuguese, the Chinese, and to a much lesser extent the Dutch and the English for her foreign trade during the first part of the "Nanban trade period". Japan had also been very active sailing red seal ships throughout Asia, original Japanese ships that were broadly similar to Chinese junks, but incorporating various Western techniques and designs (such as square and lateen sails), but had never ventured as far as the Americas.

The shōgun Tokugawa Ieyasu was eager to develop trade with foreign nations, and was particularly looking forward to an opportunity to develop trade with the Spanish Empire. He had already asked William Adams to exchange trade proposals with the Philippines in 1608, without great success. An opening finally came when the former interim governor of the Philippines Rodrigo de Vivero y Aberrucia was shipwrecked on the coast of Japan in 1609. Rodrigo de Vivero y Aberrucia remained in Japan for 9 months, and took the opportunity to negotiate the first treaty of exchanges between Japan and New Spain, involving offering extraterritorial privileges for a Spanish shipyard and a Naval base in the eastern Japan in exchange for transpacific trade and Mexican silver mining technology.

== First Japanese to the Americas (1610) ==
In August 1610 Tanaka Shōsuke was ordered by the retired shōgun Tokugawa Ieyasu to accompany Rodrigo de Vivero y Aberrucia back to New Spain (Nueva España), together with 22 other Japanese representatives, on board the San Buena Ventura, a 120-ton ship built in Japan under the supervision of William Adams a few years earlier. Also among them was Father Muños, a Franciscan father, sent by Tokugawa Ieyasu as a representative to negotiate the establishment of trade between Japan and Nueva España.

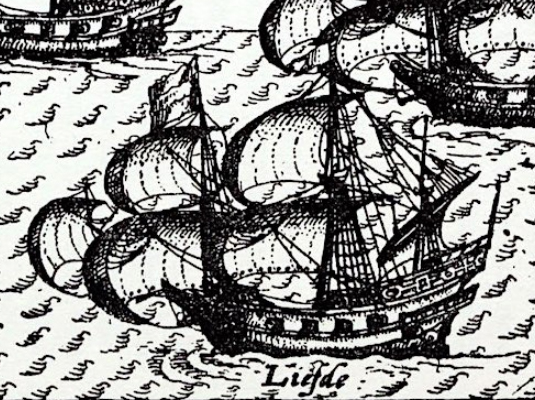
San Buena Ventura was built on the model of Liefde (depicted here), the ship on which William Adams originally reached Japan.

Following their arrival in New Spain in November 1610, Luis de Velasco, the viceroy of New Spain received the 23 Japanese and expressed his great satisfaction at the treatment the Spanish sailors had received in Japan. He decided to send an embassy to Japan in the person of the famous explorer Sebastián Vizcaíno. The viceroy confiscated the San Buena Ventura however, fearful that the Japanese would manage to master the art of trans-oceanic navigation.

Spanish sources indicate that Tanaka Shōsuke studied silver mining techniques in New Spain before returning to Japan, obtaining knowledge which would have been very useful to Japan as it relied on silver (and copper) for the payment of her imports. Tanaka Shosuke is also reported as having brought back mulberry wood from the New World, which he offered to Tokugawa Ieyasu, who used it to build a bath in his Palace.

A contemporary journal, written by the historian Chimalpahin Quauhtlehuanitzin, a noble Aztec born in Amecameca (ancient Chalco province) in 1579, whose Spanish name was Domingo Francisco de San Anton Muñon, gives some account of the visit of Tanaka. He explains that Tanaka, retailer and merchant, was considered and treated as an ambassador for the commercial exchanges between Japan and New Spain:

Today, Thursday in the afternoon, the 16th of the month of December of the year 1610, at 6 o'clock, was when perhaps as many as nineteen people from Japan, China, arrived and entered here in the city of Mexico. A noble, their lord, the ambassador, from the court of the great ruler the emperor of Japan, who brought them, came to make peace with the Christians so that they would never make war but always be at peace and esteem each other, so that Spanish merchants will be able to enter Japan and none of the people there will be able to impede them. And likewise the people of Japan will be able to come enter New Spain to do business, to come here to sell goods that are made there, and no one here will be able to impede them, for thus the lord Viceroy don Luis de Velasco, Marqués of Salinas, whom they came to see, informed them

He also says that they were allowed to walk with their sword at the side, something not usually permitted to traders, and that they were in formal Japanese attire:

And they came gotten up as they are gotten up up there; they wear something like an ornamented jacket, doublet, or long blouse, which they tie at their middle, their waist; there they place a katana of metal, which counts as their swords. ... They seem bold, not gentle and meek people, going about like eagles

Several of the Japanese (at least three according to Chimalpahin's account) chose to be baptized in New Spain, starting with the head of the delegation, who took the Christian name of Don Alonso:

They were baptized in true splendour. It was done in the presence of all the different ecclesiastics who dwell in Mexico, who all appeared here. The first baptized was a noble and lord of Japan whose name upon baptism became don Alonso; don Hernando Altamirano, then captain of the guard, became his godfather.

Tanaka Shōsuke was also baptized, and took the Christian name of "Don Francisco de Velasco Josuke".

According to the account, three Japanese from the mission of Tanaka chose to remain in New Spain. He relates the departure of the group:

Today, Monday, the 7th of the month of March of the year 1611, was when Sebastián Vizcaíno, citizen of Mexico, set out and left Mexico here, appointed general of the China boats going to China [the Philippines]. At that time he then took the Japanese; he placed next to himself the Japanese nobleman whose name was now Don Alonso and who now went dressed as a Spaniard, to return to his home; here he threw away his outfit that he wore coming here. He was the only one to change [his clothing] here in Mexico. They had been here in Mexico just two months when seventeen of them returned home; three stayed in Mexico.

Tanaka Shōsuke returned to Japan in 1611 with Sebastian Vizcaino. Vizcaino had a mission to return 4,000 ducados that Tokugawa Ieyasu had lent to the previous mission, and to research "gold and silver islands", supposedly to the east of Japan. They left for Japan on 22 March 1611, and arrived in the harbour of Uraga.

== Second travel (1613) ==
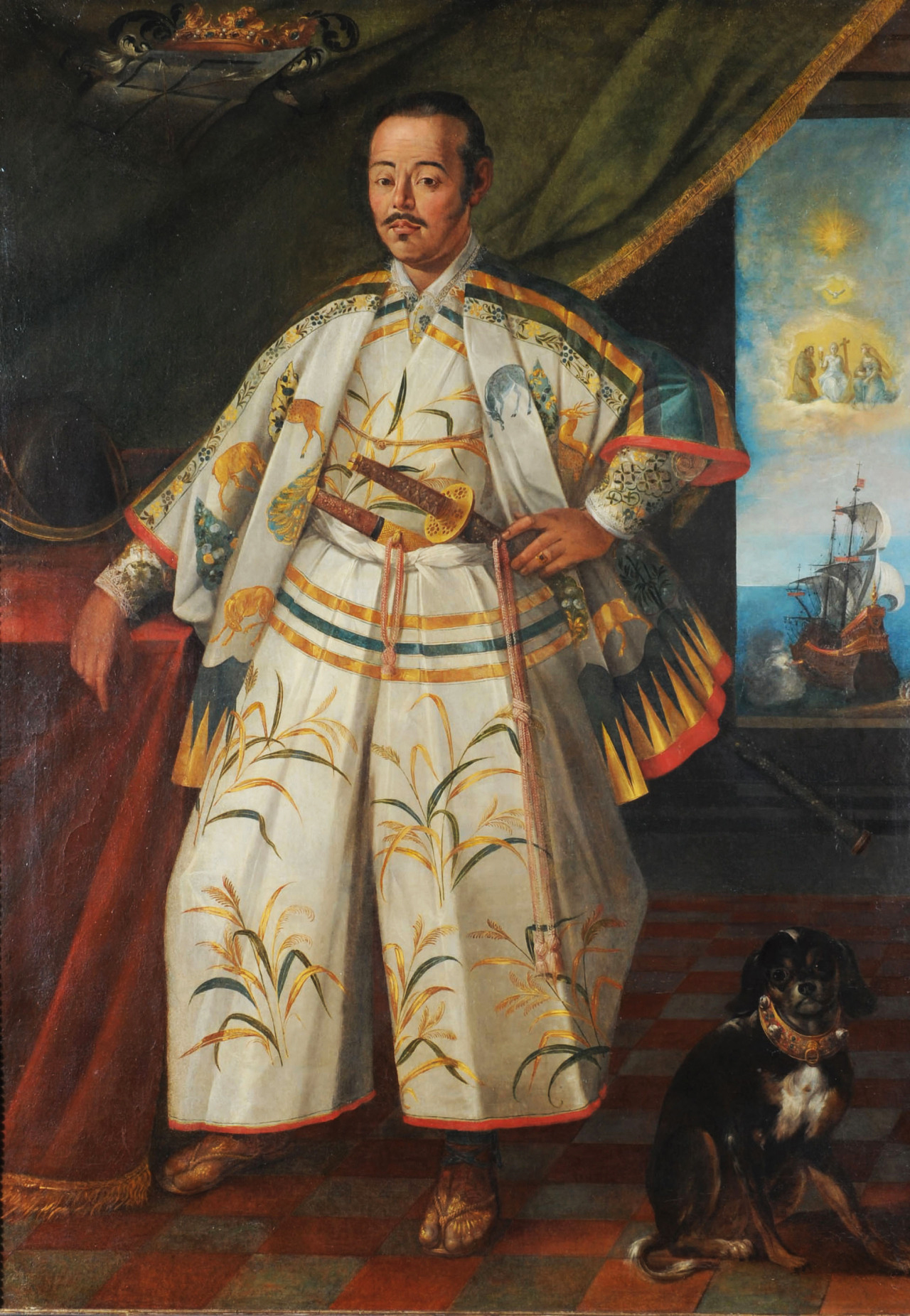
Hasekura Tsunenaga's portrait during his embassy in 1615, by Claude Deruet, Coll. Borghese, Rome.

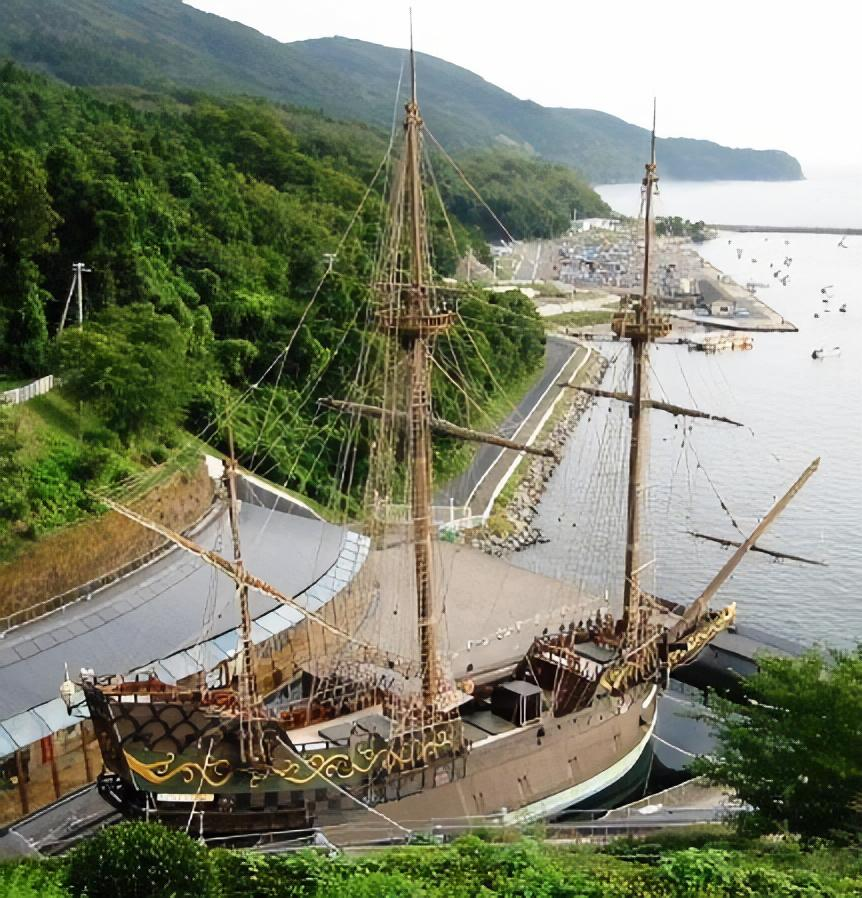
A replica of the Japanese-built galleon San Juan Bautista, in Ishinomaki, Japan.

Tanaka Shosuke helped prepare the first official Japanese embassy to the Americas and Europe, by meeting extensively with Hasekura Tsunenaga, who was in charge of the project.

He is recorded as again having left for the Americas in 1613 on board Hasekura's Japanese-built 500-ton galleon San Juan Bautista with the embassy and a total of 140 Japanese. Sebastian Vizcaino, whose own ship had been disabled in a storm near Japan, was also on the San Juan Bautista to return to New Spain.

Some of the Japanese traders who had been left behind in New Spain by Tanaka four years before took the opportunity of the return trip of the San Juan Bautista in October 1614 to return to Japan:

Today, Tuesday the 14th of the month of October of the year 1614, was when some Japanese set out from Mexico here going home to Japan; they lived here in Mexico for four years. Some still remained here; they earn a living trading and selling here the goods they brought with them from Japan

It is unknown whether Tanaka Shosuke continued with Hasekura to Europe, or stayed in New Spain waiting for the return of Hasekura, or returned to Japan in October 1614.

== See also ==
- Kirishitan
- Sakoku
- Nanban trade period
