= Hasekura =

Hasekura (written: 支倉) is a Japanese surname. Notable people with the surname include:

- Isuna Hasekura (支倉 凍砂, born 1982), Japanese writer
- Hasekura Tsunenaga (支倉 六右衛門 常長, 1571–1622), Japanese samurai and daimyō
