= Abraham Savgrain =

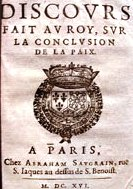
A 1616 book published by Abraham Savgrain.

Abraham Savgrain was a French publisher in the early 17th century. He was located Rue St Jacques, in Paris. Among other books, he published:

- Ad veritatem hermeticae medicinae stabiliendam, by Duchesne, Joseph, 1604
- Récit de l'entrée solemnelle et remarquable faite à Rome, par Dom Philippe Francois Faxicura ("Account of the solemn and remarkable entrance in Rome of Dom Philippe Francois Faxicura"), in 1616
- Libre discovrs fait av roy, svr la conclvsion de la paix. Paris: Abraham Savgrain, 1516 [i.e., 1616].
- Observations diverses de Lovyse Bovrgeois ditte Bovrsier Sage-femme de la Royne by Boursier, Louise Bourgeois, 1617
- Stances au Roy sur le mort de conchine Marquis d'Ancre, 1617.
- Le procez du Marquids d'Ancre, 1617
