= Arthur Tsuneo Wakabayashi =

Canadian civil servant

Arthur Tsuneo Wakabayashi OC
- Born: May 12, 1932 (age 93); Regina, Saskatchewan
- Occupation: Civil servant

Arthur "Art" Tsuneo Wakabayashi, CM SOM (born May 12, 1932) is a Canadian civil servant.

Born in Regina, Saskatchewan, Wakabayashi was a provincial deputy finance minister, assistant deputy minister to the federal solicitor general, and federal economic development minister. He was Chancellor of the University of Regina.

== Honours ==
In 2000, he was made a Member of the Order of Canada in recognition for being a "devoted career public servant". In 2012, he was awarded the Order of the Rising Sun, 3rd Class, Gold Rays with Neck Ribbon. In 2013, he was made a Member of the Saskatchewan Order of Merit.
