= Wakabayashi Station =

Wakabayashi Station (若林駅) is the name of two train stations in Japan:

- Wakabayashi Station (Aichi)
- Wakabayashi Station (Tokyo)
