= Japanese warship San Buena Ventura =

17th c. Japanese warship

History

Japan
- Name: San Buena Ventura
- Ordered: 1604
- Builder: William Adams
- Laid down: 1607
- Launched: 1607
- Commissioned: 1607
- Fate: Seized by Spain in 1610; fate unknown

General characteristics
- Tons burthen: 120 tonnes
- Propulsion: 3 masted sailboat
- Complement: ~339

San Buena Ventura was a 120-ton ship built in Japan under the direction of the English navigator and adventurer William Adams for the shogun Tokugawa Ieyasu. The ship was built in 1607, and followed the construction of a smaller 80-ton ship, also by William Adams, which had been used for the charting of the waters around Japan. Tokugawa Ieyasu ordered the second, bigger, ship for travels to other countries.

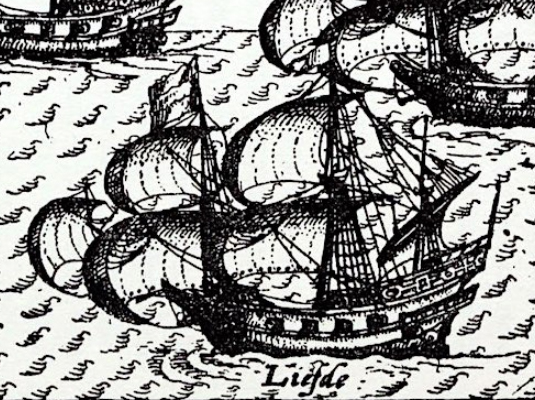
San Buena Ventura was built on the model of Liefde (depicted here), the ship on which William Adams originally reached Japan.

On 30 September 1609, the Spanish galleon San Francisco with a crew of 373 was wrecked on the coast of Chiba, Japan (near the present-day town of Onjuku), and the 317 survivors were received warmly by the Japanese. One of the passengers was the governor of the Philippines, Rodrigo de Vivero y Aberrucia. He had the opportunity to meet the shogun Tokugawa Hidetada, and the following year his father Tokugawa Ieyasu, meetings in which the Franciscan friar Luis Sotelo, who had been in Japan for a few years, acted as an interpreter.

Ieyasu expressed his desire to expand trade with New Spain (Mexico) and Spain. Rodrigo de Vivero answered that he could readily organize trade on a scale surpassing that of the Dutch, the main rivals of Spain in Asia at the time. He also offered to send to Japan 50 experts in silver mining from Mexico. In exchange, he asked for the protection of Spanish priests in Japan, support for shipwrecked boats on the Japanese coasts, and the expulsion of Dutch merchants from Japan, the last request being rejected by Ieyasu.

In order for the Spanish to return to Mexico, Ieyasu lent them William Adams's ship, also lent them the equivalent of 4,000 ducados for the trip. Rodrigo de Vivero made it back to Mexico on board the ship in 1610. Twenty-two Japanese were also on board, led by Tanaka Shōsuke, who became the first recorded Japanese to reach the continent. Luis de Velasco, the viceroy of New Spain received the 22 Japanese and expressed his great satisfaction at the treatment the Spanish sailors had received in Japan. He, however, confiscated the San Buena Ventura, fearing that the Japanese would become experts at trans-oceanic navigation.

The viceroy of New Spain decided to send an embassy to Japan in the person of the explorer Sebastián Vizcaíno. Vizcaino also had a mission to return the 4,000 ducados and to research "gold and silver islands", supposedly to the east of Japan. He left for Japan on 22 March 1611, and after another shipwreck eventually returned in 1613 on board the Japanese-built galleon San Juan Bautista with the first official Japanese embassy to the Americas and Europe, led by Hasekura Tsunenaga.
