= Republic of Ezo =

1869 short-lived state on Hokkaido

Coordinates: 41°47′49″N 140°45′25″E

Ezo Island Government 蝦夷島政府 (Japanese) Ezogashima Seifu
- 1869
- Government flag (Note: The Government flag (御国印 [ごこくいん, Gokokuin] )in 1869 - Republic of Ezo (Japan)」Flags of the World)) Seal (Note: The "Seal of the Governor General of Hokuitō (Hokkaido)" (北夷島總督印) used by Enomoto Takeaki during his administration of the Ezo Republic -「明治2年七重村開墾条約書」(Reclamation Treaty of Nanae Village,<1869>), 北海道大学附属図書館(Hokkaido University Library))

- Location of Ezo (dark green)
- Status: Break-away state
- Capital: Hakodate
- Common languages: Japanese, Ainu
- Government: Presidential republic under a samurai aristocracy
- Sosai
  - 1869: Enomoto Takeaki
- Historical era: Bakumatsu
  - Established: January 27, 1869
  - Disestablished: June 27, 1869
- Currency: The tri-metallic Tokugawa coinage system based on copper Mon, silver Bu and Shu, as well as gold Ryō
Preceded by	Succeeded by
Tokugawa shogunate	Empire of Japan
- Today part of: Japan

The Ezo Island Government (蝦夷島政府, Ezogashima Seifu), also known as the Republic of Ezo (蝦夷共和國, Ezo Kyōwakoku), was a short-lived separatist state established in 1869 on the island of Ezo, now Hokkaido, by a part of the former military of the Tokugawa shogunate at the end of the Bakumatsu period in Japan. It was the first government to attempt to institute democracy in Japan, though voting was limited to the samurai caste. The Republic of Ezo existed for five months before being annexed by the newly established Empire of Japan.

== Background ==
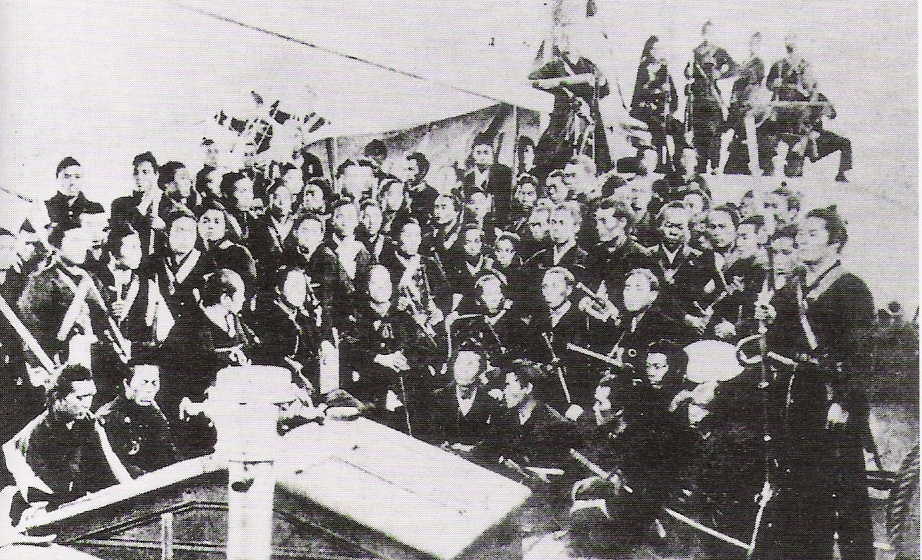
Troops of the former bakufu being transported to Ezo (Hokkaido) in 1868

After the overthrow of the Tokugawa shogunate (bakufu) in the Boshin War by the Meiji Restoration, a part of the former shōgun's navy, led by Admiral Enomoto Takeaki, retreated from the capital Edo (Tokyo) in October 1868, sailing north to continue the fight against the advancing Imperial army. Along with Enomoto were many other former Tokugawa officers, including the Commander-in-Chief of the shogunate's army, Matsudaira Tarō, and French officers Jules Brunet and André Cazeneuve, former members of a military training mission to Japan, who had refused to leave the country after being recalled to France in late September.

Shortly before midnight on 4 October, the ships left the port of Shinagawa in Tokyo Bay. Enomoto's fleet consisted of four warships (Kaiyō maru (flagship), Kaiten maru, Banryū maru and Chiyodagata maru) and four transport ships (Kanrin maru, Shinsoku maru, Chōgei maru and Mikaho maru).

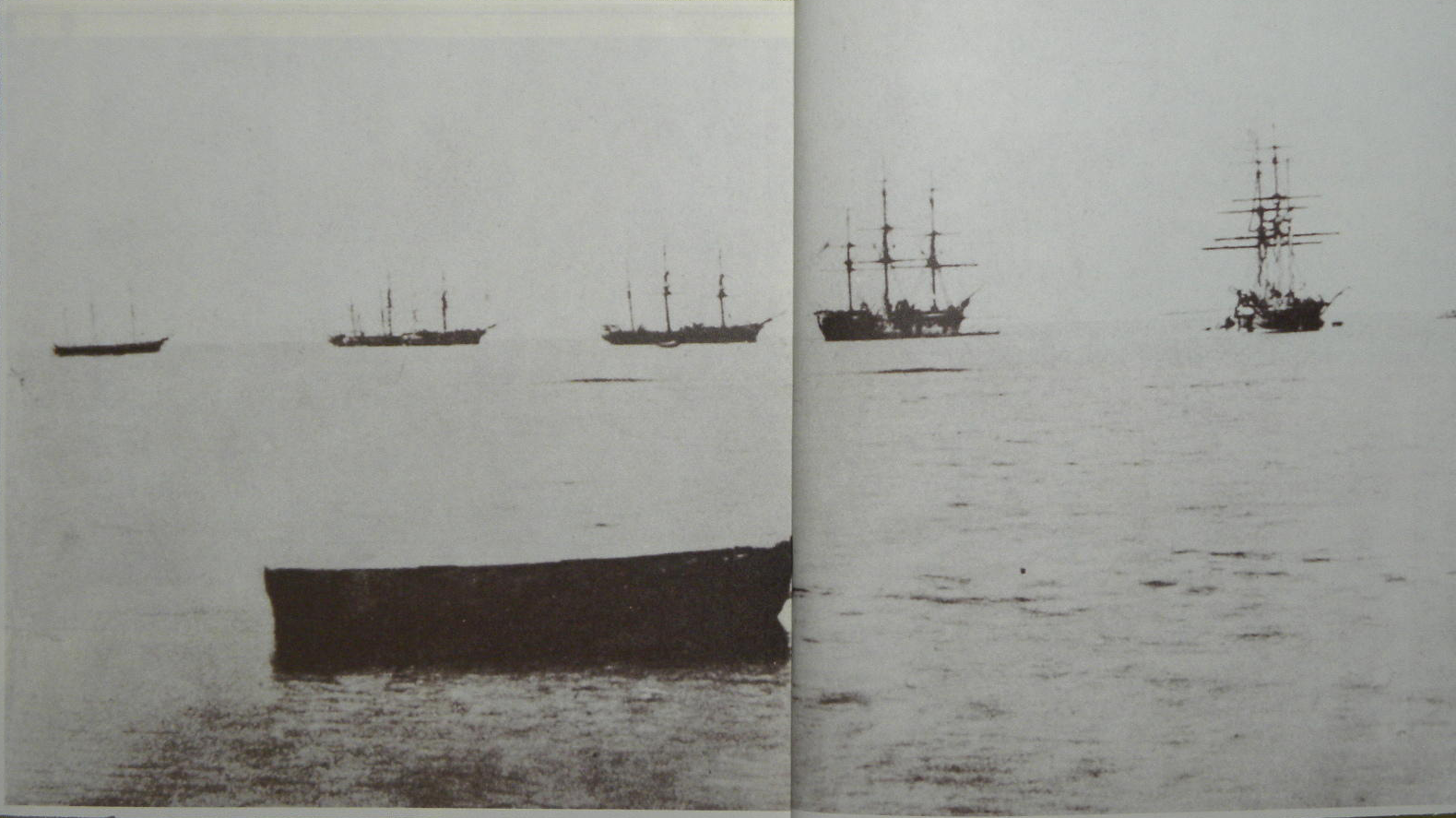
(From right to left) The ships Kaiten, Kaiyō, Kanrin, Chōgei, Mikaho, part of the fleet led by Enomoto Takeaki, while anchored off Shinagawa shortly before their departure

The fleet first arrived in Sendai, where they were joined by three more French defectors, Arthur Fortant, François Bouffier and Jean Marlin. Enomoto's goal was to gather military support from the clans of the disbanded Ōuetsu Reppan Dōmei (also known as "Northern Alliance"), but this ended in failure after a major clan defected to the Imperial side. After one month in Sendai the fleet sailed further north, arriving in Hakodate, Ezo, on 3 December, which was captured five days later by a force of 4,000 shogunate troops.

With support from the French advisers led by Brunet, Enomoto's army continued the conquest of Ezo, capturing Matsumae Castle (18 December) and Esashi (28 December), and by the end of the year the region was under full control of the rebels. Enomoto made a last effort to petition the Imperial Court to be allowed to develop Hokkaido and maintain the traditions of the samurai unmolested, but his request was denied.

== History ==
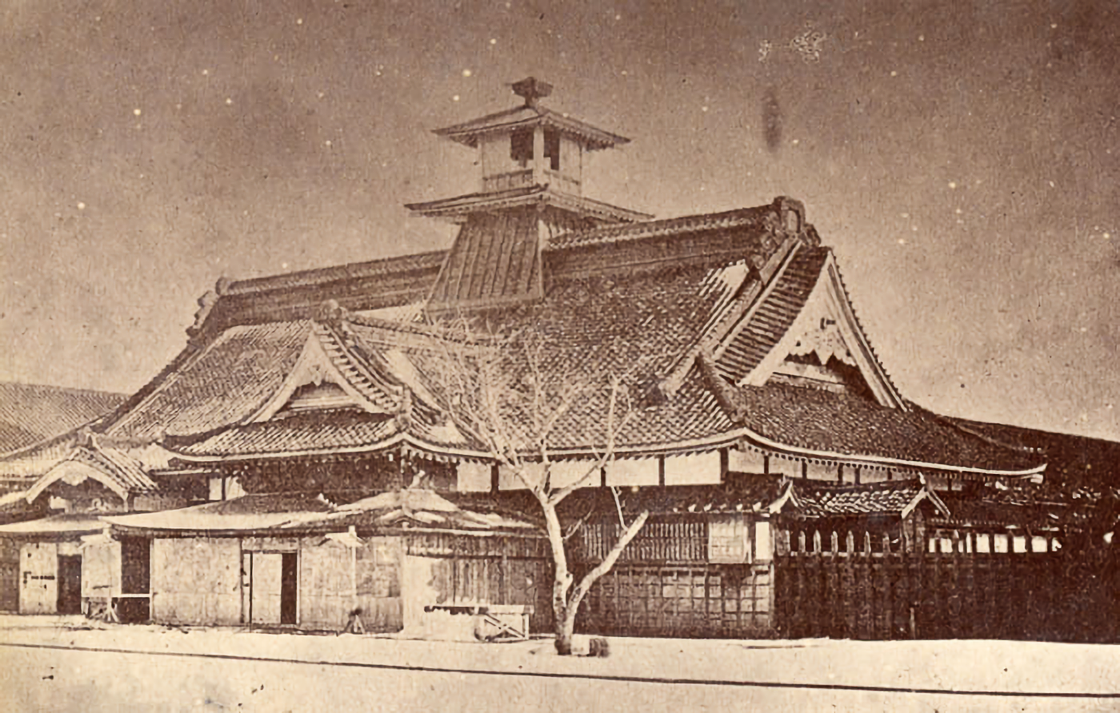
The governmental building of the Republic of Ezo at Goryōkaku, formerly the offices of the Hakodate bugyō

On January 27, 1869, the independent "Republic of Ezo" was proclaimed, with its government structure based on the United States. Suffrage was limited to the samurai class. Votes were cast through open ballots and resulted in the election of Enomoto Takeaki as sosai, an office variously translated as president or director-general, and Matsudaira Tarō as fuku-sosai (vice-president or assistant governor-general). Some cabinet members were elected by the troops as well; Arai Ikunosuke was chosen as kaigun-bugyō (Navy minister) and Ōtori Keisuke as rikugun-bugyō (Army minister). This was the first election ever held in Japan, where a feudal structure under an Emperor with military warlords was the norm. Through Hakodate magistrate Nagai Naoyuki, attempts were made to reach out to foreign legations present in Hakodate to obtain international diplomatic recognition. Notably, due to the United States' involvement through Commodore Matthew Perry's expedition to forcefully end Japan's 220-year-old policy of isolation and open ports to American trade, the Western world had limited interest in supporting a breakaway state over the new Meiji government, which offered more stability and potential cooperation.

On the same day, a celebration of the Ezo territory all-island settlement (Ezo territory declaration ceremony) was held, proclaiming the establishment of a provisional government with Enomoto as president.

The treasury included 180,000 gold ryō coins Enomoto retrieved from Osaka Castle following shōgun Tokugawa Yoshinobu's precipitous departure after the Battle of Toba–Fushimi in early 1868.

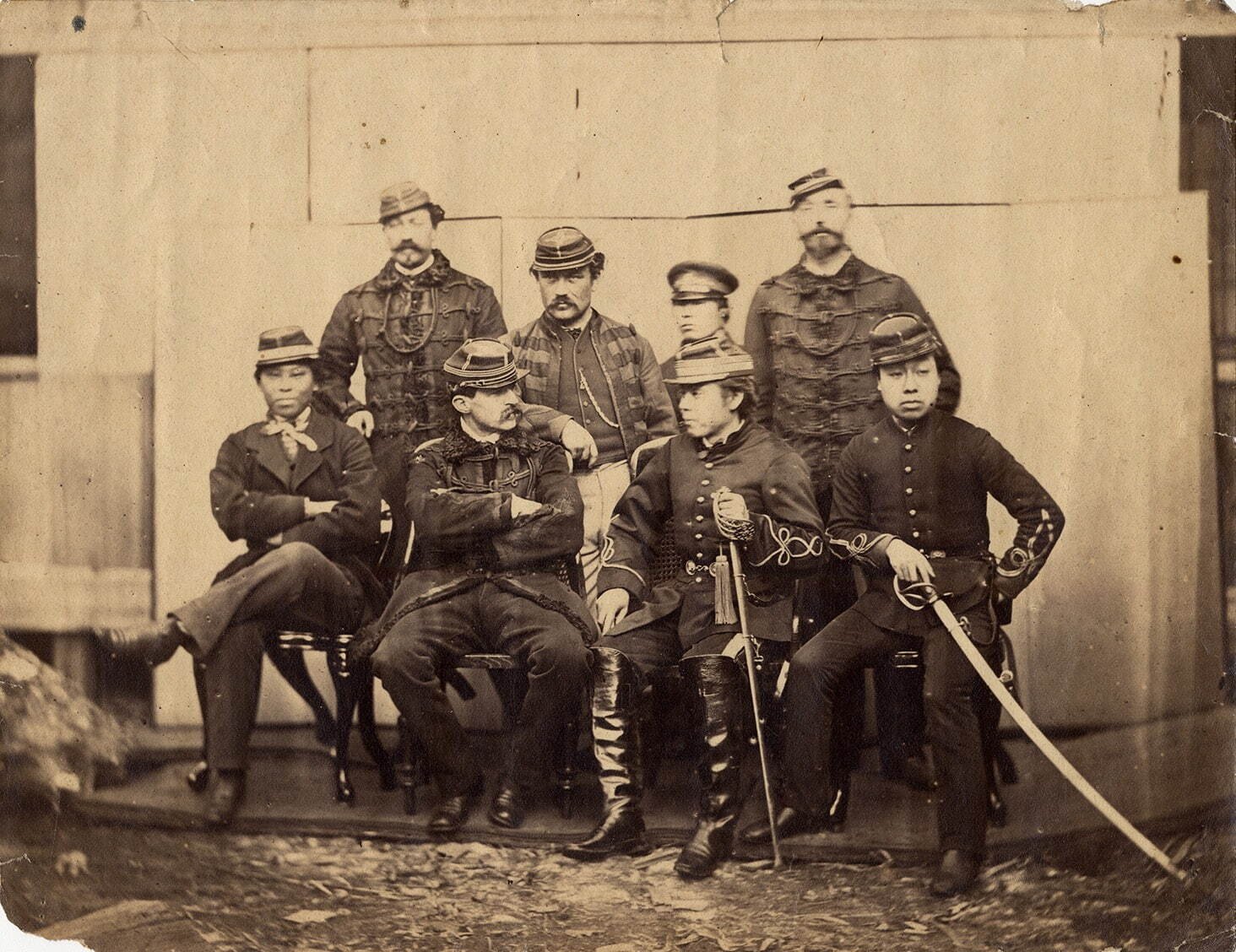
The French military advisors and their Japanese allies in Ezo. Front row, second from left: Jules Brunet, turning towards Matsudaira Tarō

During the winter of 1868–1869, the defences around the southern peninsula of Hakodate were enhanced, with the star fortress of Goryōkaku at the centre. The land force was organised under a joint Franco-Japanese command, commander-in-chief Ōtori Keisuke being seconded by the French captain Jules Brunet. The troops were divided into four brigades, each commanded by a French officer (Arthur Fortant, Jean Marlin, André Cazeneuve and François Bouffier). Each brigade was in turn divided into two battalions, and these into four companies.

Brunet demanded (and received) a signed personal pledge of loyalty from all officers and insisted they assimilate French ideas. An anonymous French officer wrote that Brunet had taken charge of everything:

... customs, municipality, fortifications, army; everything passed through his hands. The simple Japanese are puppets whom he manipulates with great skill... he has carried out a veritable 1789 French Revolution in this brave new Japan; the election of leaders and the determination of rank by merit and not birth—these are fabulous things for this country, and he has been able to do things very well, considering the seriousness of the situation...

== Defeat by Imperial forces and aftermath ==
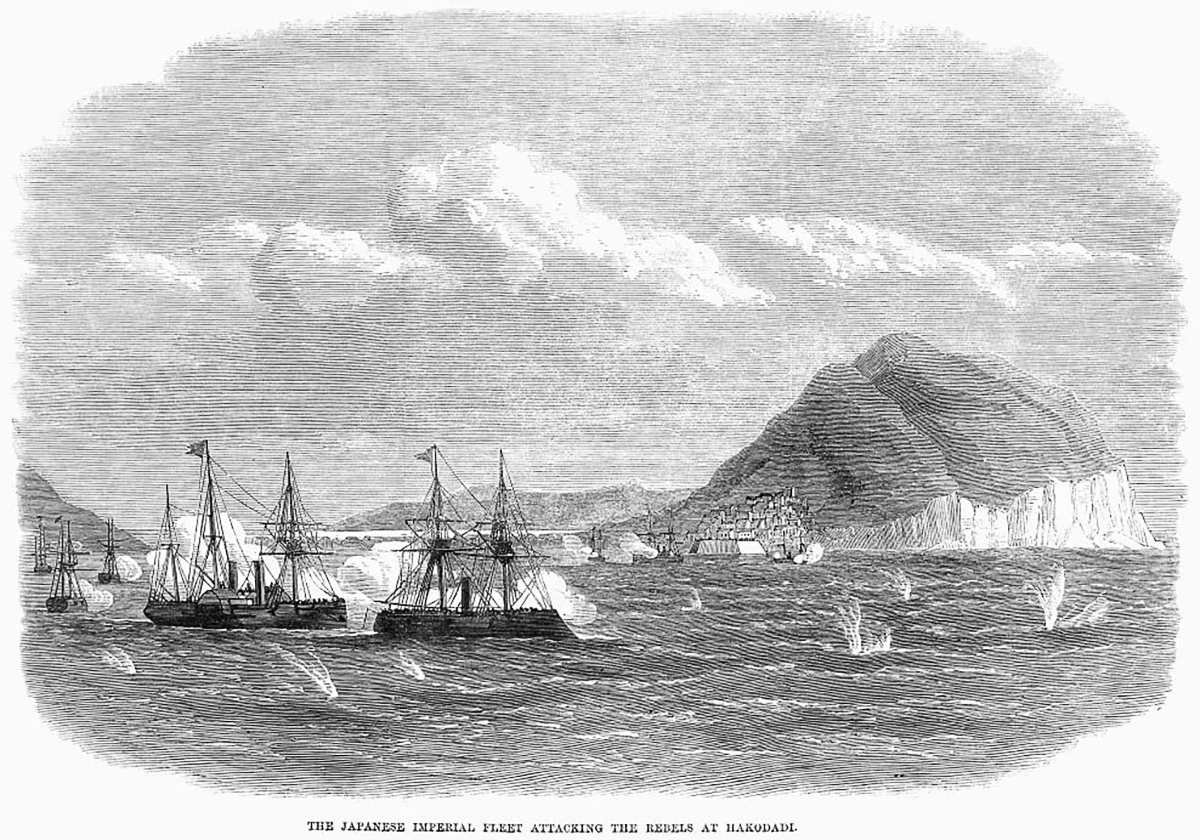
The Naval Battle of Hakodate Bay, May 1869; in the foreground, Kasuga and Kōtetsu of the Imperial Japanese Navy.

Imperial troops soon consolidated their hold on mainland Japan, and in April 1869 dispatched a fleet and an infantry force of 7,000 men to Hokkaido. The Imperial forces progressed swiftly, won the Battle of Hakodate, and surrounded the fortress at Goryōkaku. Enomoto surrendered on June 26, 1869, turning the Goryōkaku over to Satsuma staff officer Kuroda Kiyotaka on June 27, 1869. Kuroda is said to have been deeply impressed by Enomoto's dedication in combat and is remembered as the one who spared the latter's life from execution. On September 20 of the same year, the island was given its present name, Hokkaido (Hokkaidō, literally "Northern Sea Region").

Enomoto was sentenced to a brief prison sentence, but was freed in 1872 and accepted a post as a government official in the newly renamed Hokkaido Land Agency. He later became ambassador to Russia and held several ministerial positions in the Meiji Government

The rebels' French allies, some of them wounded, sailed from Hakodate on 9 June aboard the French vessel Coëtlogon to Yokohama, where Cazeneuve was admitted to the local naval hospital. Their leader Jules Brunet returned to France in September 1869. He was suspended from active duty in the French army in October, and was later put on trial but received only a light sentence of minor loss in seniority. In February 1870 Brunet was recalled to service, and back as a captain fought in the Franco-Prussian War later that year. In 1871, Arthur Fortant, Jean Marlin, and François Bouffier signed an employment contract with professor Harada Ichido (father of Harada Naojirō) and returned to Japan as civilians to teach at the military school of Osaka.

== Perspectives ==
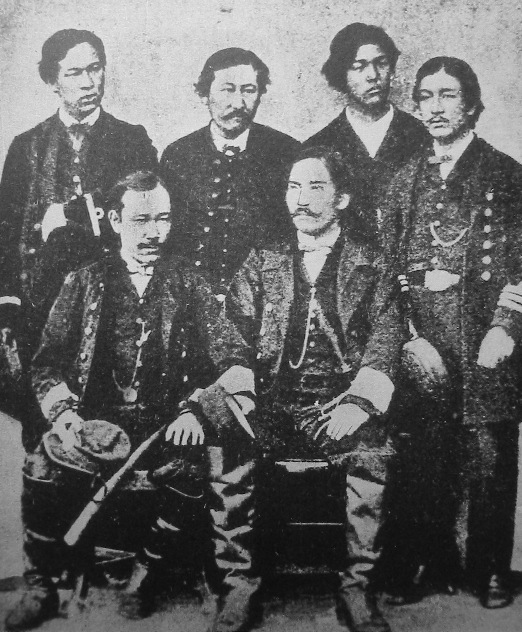
Leaders of the Republic of Ezo, with the President Enomoto Takeaki (seated, right).

While later history texts were to refer to May 1869 as being when Enomoto accepted Emperor Meiji's rule, the Imperial rule was never in question for the Ezo Republic, as made evident by part of Enomoto's message to the Daijō-kan (太政官, Dajōkan) at the time of his arrival in Hakodate:

The farmers and merchants are unmolested, and live without fear, going their own way, and sympathising with us; so that already we have been able to bring some land into cultivation. We pray that this portion of the Empire may be conferred upon our late lord, Tokugawa Kamenosuke; and in that case, we shall repay your beneficence by our faithful guardianship of the northern gate.

Thus from Enomoto's perspective, the efforts to establish a government in Hokkaido were not only for the sake of providing for the Tokugawa clan on the one hand (burdened as it was with an enormous amount of redundant retainers and employees) but also as developing Ezo for the sake of defence for the rest of Japan, something which had been a topic of concern for some time. Recent scholarship has noted that for centuries, Ezo was not considered a part of Japan the same way that the other "main" islands of modern Japan were, so the creation of the Ezo Republic, in a contemporary mindset, was not an act of secession, but rather of "bringing" the sociopolitical entity of "Japan" formally to the island of Hokkaido.

Several historians have questioned whether the Ezo Republic can accurately be described as a republic. There are no contemporary documents that actually describe the state as a republic and there are doubts about the intents of Enamato to create a republican state, as some documents show that he intended to bring the heir of the last shogun to become a monarch. In Enamoto’s election only senior officers were allowed to participate. This leads some authors to conclude that the Ezo state was more like a constitutional monarchy. Japanese newspapers at the time also did not call the state a republic. Western observers however did call it a republic. This might be explained by the fact that kyōwakoku, the Japanese word for republic, was not well known yet.

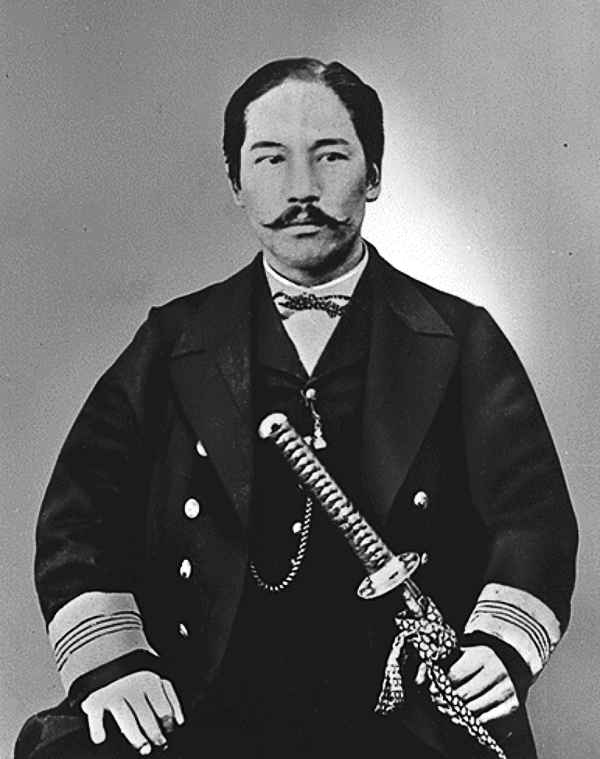
Enomoto Takeaki, President.

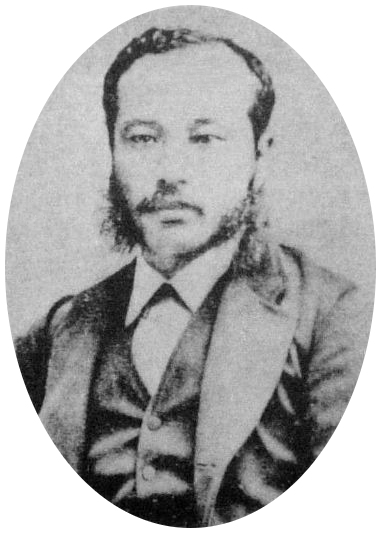
Ōtori Keisuke, Commander-in-Chief.

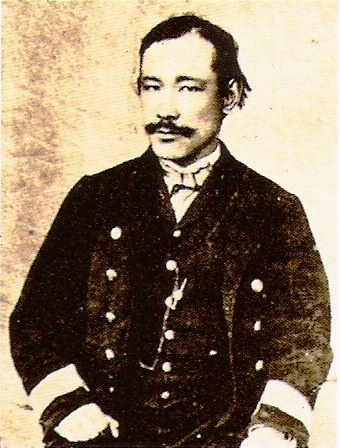
Arai Ikunosuke, Commander of the Navy.

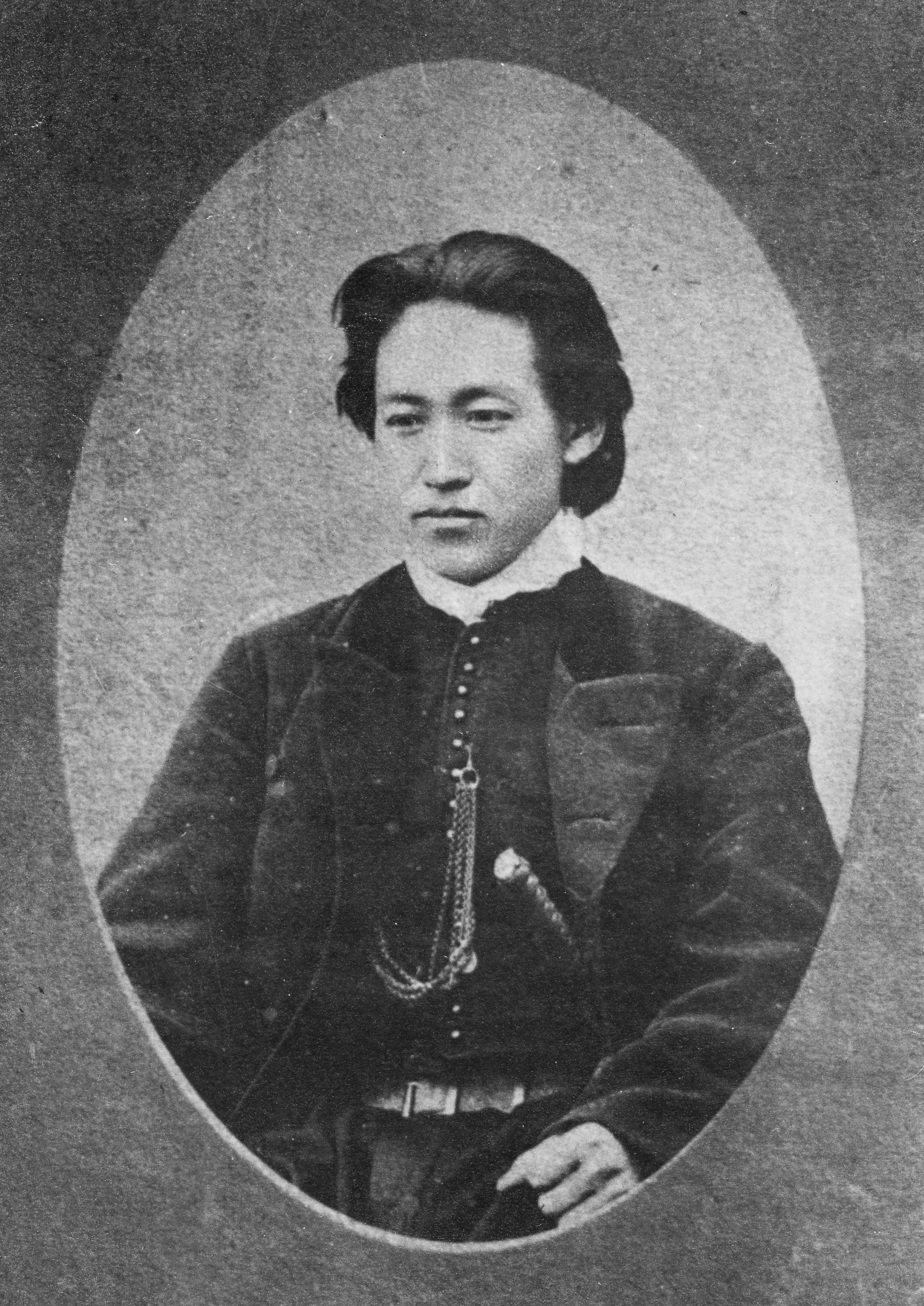
Hijikata Toshizō, Commander of the Shinsengumi.

Government officials
Role	Official
President	Enomoto Takeaki
Vice-President	Matsudaira Tarō
Navy Minister	Arai Ikunosuke
Army Minister	Ōtori Keisuke
Assistant Army Minister	Hijikata Toshizō
Hakodate Magistrate	Nagai Naoyuki
Assistant Hakodate Magistrate	Nakajima Saburosuke
Esashi Magistrate	Matsuoka Bankichi
Assistant Esashi Magistrate	Kosugi Masanoshin
Matsumae Magistrate	Hitomi Katsutarō
Minister for Land Reclamation	Sawa Tarozaemon
Finance Minister	Enomoto Michiaki
Finance Minister	Kawamura Rokushirō
Commander of Warships	Koga Gengo
Infantry Commander	Furuya Sakuzaemon
Judge Advocate General Officer	Takenaka Shigekata
Judge Advocate General Officer	Imai Nobuo
