= Jules Brunet =

French military officer (1838-1911)

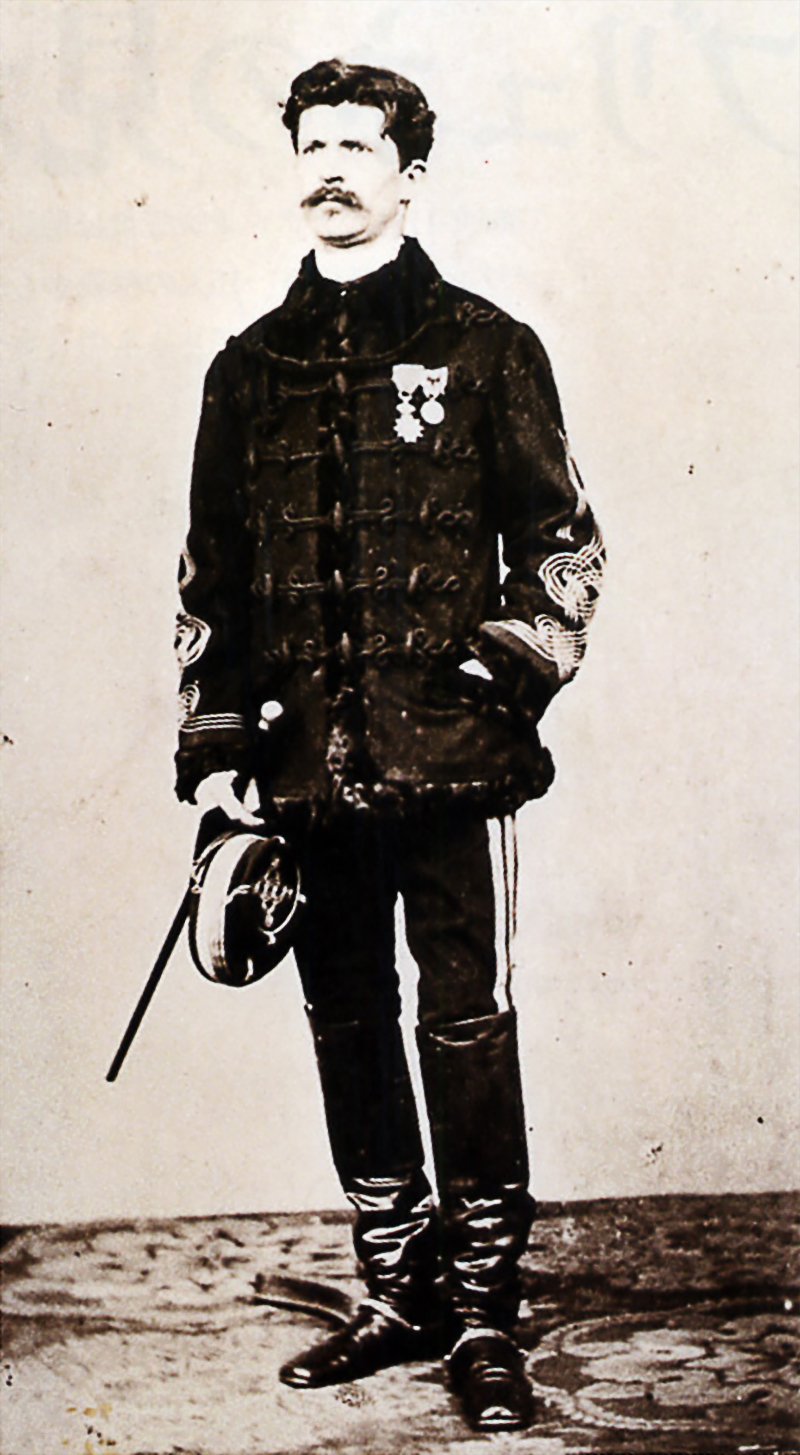
- Jules Brunet in Japan, 1868
- Born: 2 January 1838; Belfort, France
- Died: 12 August 1911 (aged 73); Fontenay-sous-Bois, France
- Military career
- Allegiance: Second French Empire; Tokugawa shogunate Republic of Ezo; French Third Republic
- Branch: French Army
- Service years: 1857–1899
- Rank: General of division
- Conflicts: Second French intervention in Mexico; Boshin War; Franco-Prussian War; Paris Commune
- Awards: Grand Officer of the Légion d'honneur; Order of the Rising Sun, Gold and Silver Star; Order of the Sacred Treasure

Jules Brunet (French: [ʒyl bʁynɛ]; 2 January 1838 – 12 August 1911) was a French military officer who served the Tokugawa shogunate during the Boshin War in Japan. Originally sent to Japan as a horse artillery instructor with the French military mission of 1867, he refused to leave the country after the shōgun was defeated, and played a leading role in the separatist Republic of Ezo and its fight against forces of the Meiji Restoration. After the rebellion's defeat, he returned to France, fought in the Franco-Prussian War (1870-1871), later reached the rank of general of division, and worked for the Ministry of War.

Jules Brunet was an inspiration for the character played by Tom Cruise in the 2003 film The Last Samurai.

== Early life and career ==
Brunet was born on 2 January 1838 in Belfort, in the region of Bourgogne-Franche-Comté, in eastern France. He was the son of Jean-Michel Brunet, a veterinary doctor in the army, and his wife Louise-Adine Rocher. In 1855, he began his military education after being admitted to Saint-Cyr, which he left two years later to enter the École Polytechnique. Graduating 68th of 120 in his class, Brunet joined the horse artillery, and finished his education at the school of artillery of Metz, where he excelled in his studies and graduated in fourth place in his course, in 1861.

Shortly after graduating, Brunet was sent to serve in the French invasion of Mexico. As a sub-lieutenant in the horse artillery regiment of the Imperial Guard, he served with distinction throughout the war, particularly during the Siege of Puebla in 1863, for which he was awarded by Emperor Napoleon III with the Cross of the Légion d'honneur. He was promoted to captain of the artillery in 1867, and was then Knight of the Légion d'honneur. During his time in Mexico, Brunet was able to create a number of quickly-drawn croquis, many of which were then published by French newspapers to illustrate the war.

== Mission to Japan ==
In 1866, the French government decided to send a group of military advisors to Japan to help modernize the Shogun's army. For his distinguished performance in the artillery school and in the war in Mexico, Brunet was a main choice for the artillery corps of the mission. He was notably recommended to Napoleon III by government official Émilien de Nieuwerkerke, who also noted Brunet's drawing skills and his "most great desire to be in charge of a military mission to Japan". At 28 years old, Brunet was one of the youngest officers selected to the Mission.

The mission was composed of fifteen members, including five officers, and was led by Captain Charles Chanoine. All preparations were completed on 3 November 1866, and days later the mission departed to Japan aboard the Péluse. They arrived in January 1867, and trained the Shogun's troops for about a year. While in Japan, Brunet was promoted to captain (August 1867). Then the Shogun, in 1868, was overthrown in the Boshin War and Emperor Meiji was nominally restored to full power.

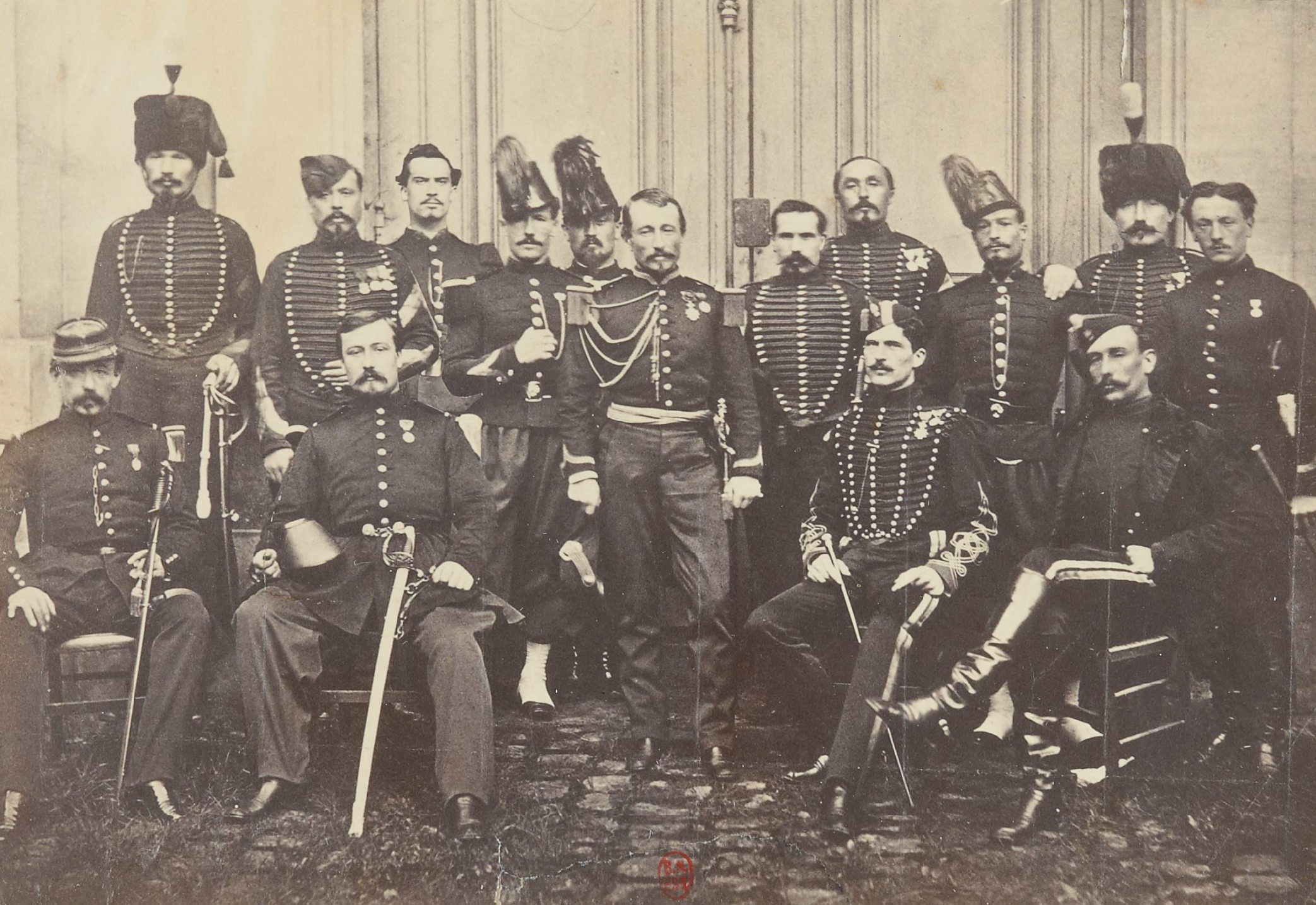
The French military mission before its departure to Japan (1867). Brunet is seated in the front row, second from right

In late September 1868, the French military mission was ordered by its government to leave Japan. Captain Chanoine arranged for the mission to leave Japan aboard two ships, which would sail on 15 and 28 October. Brunet, however, chose to stay in Japan and remain loyal to Shogun's side of the war. He decided to assist the Ōuetsu Reppan Dōmei, known as the "Northern Alliance", in their resistance against the Imperial faction. He resigned from the French army on 4 October, informing Minister of War Adolphe Niel of his decision in a letter:

"I have the honor of presenting to you my resignation from the rank of captain; I declare that from this 4 October 1868, I renounce the prerogatives of the position of artillery officer in the French army".

In another letter, to Napoleon III himself, Brunet explained the plan of the alliance, as well as his role in it:

"A revolution is forcing the Military Mission to return to France. Alone I stay, alone I wish to continue, under new conditions: the results obtained by the Mission, together with the Party of the North, which is the party favorable to France in Japan. Soon a reaction will take place, and the Daimyos of the North have offered me to be its soul. I have accepted, because with the help of one thousand Japanese officers and non-commissioned officers, our students, I can direct the 50,000 men of the Confederation [...]".

On 4 October, the day of his resignation, Brunet left the French headquarters in Yokohama under the pretext of going to visit the Franco-Japanese arsenal in Yokosuka. Instead, he went to the Shogunate's fleet anchored off Shinagawa, in Tokyo Bay, where he joined André Cazeneuve, a fellow countryman who remained loyal to the Shogun.

== Boshin War ==
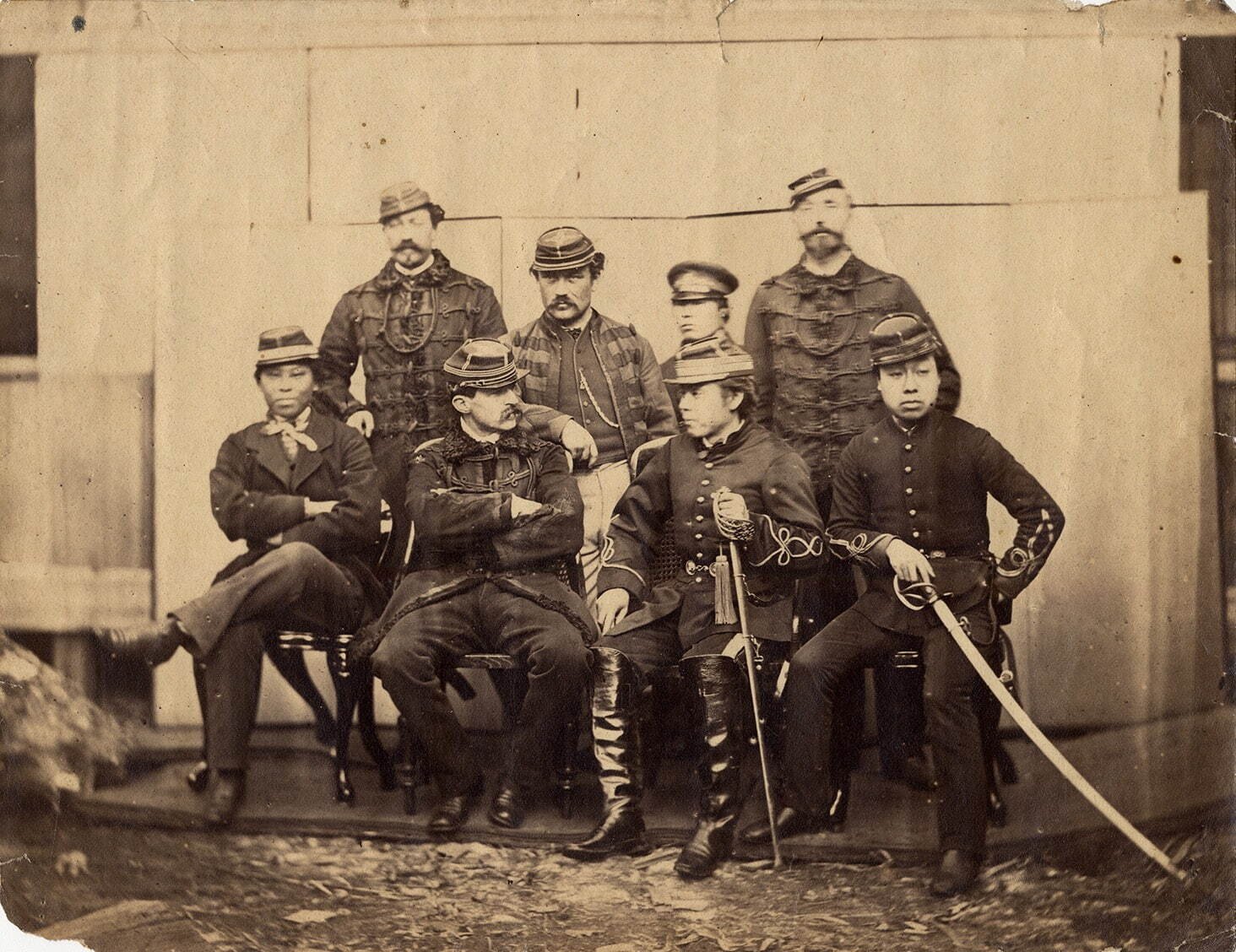
The French military advisers and their Japanese allies, c. 1868. Brunet is seated in front, second from left, turning towards shogunate officer Matsudaira Tarō

Brunet took an active role in the Boshin War. He and Cazeneuve were present at the Battle of Toba–Fushimi near Osaka, in January 1868 (before the mission was recalled to France). After that Imperial victory, Brunet, Cazeneuve and the Shogun's Admiral, Enomoto Takeaki, fled to Edo (now Tokyo) on the warship Fujisan.

When Edo also fell to Imperial forces Enomoto and Brunet escaped, first going to Sendai and then to the northern island of Hokkaidō (then known as Ezo). There they quickly captured the port city of Hakodate, on 26 October 1868, and by the end of the year Enomoto and his allies had proclaimed the independent Republic of Ezo. Brunet became the de facto Minister of Foreign Affairs of the Ezo government. He invited foreign diplomats and handled opening negotiations with foreign powers, as the Ezo state sought international recognition, and was responsible for drafting French-language announcements to his fellow officers fighting in the rebellion.

Brunet also helped to organize the Ezo army, under hybrid Franco-Japanese leadership. Otori Keisuke was Commander-in-chief and Brunet was second-in-command. Each of the four brigades were commanded by a French officer (Fortant, Marlin, Cazeneuve and Bouffier), with Japanese officers commanding each half-brigade. The final stand of the Shogun/Ezo forces was the Battle of Hakodate. The Ezo forces, numbering 3,000, were defeated by 7,000 Imperial troops in June 1869. In an interesting postscript to his involvement in the Boshin War, Brunet spoke highly of Shinsengumi vice-commander Hijikata Toshizō in his memoirs. Praising Hijikata's ability as a leader, he said that if the man had been in Europe, he most certainly would have been a general.

== Return to France and later career ==
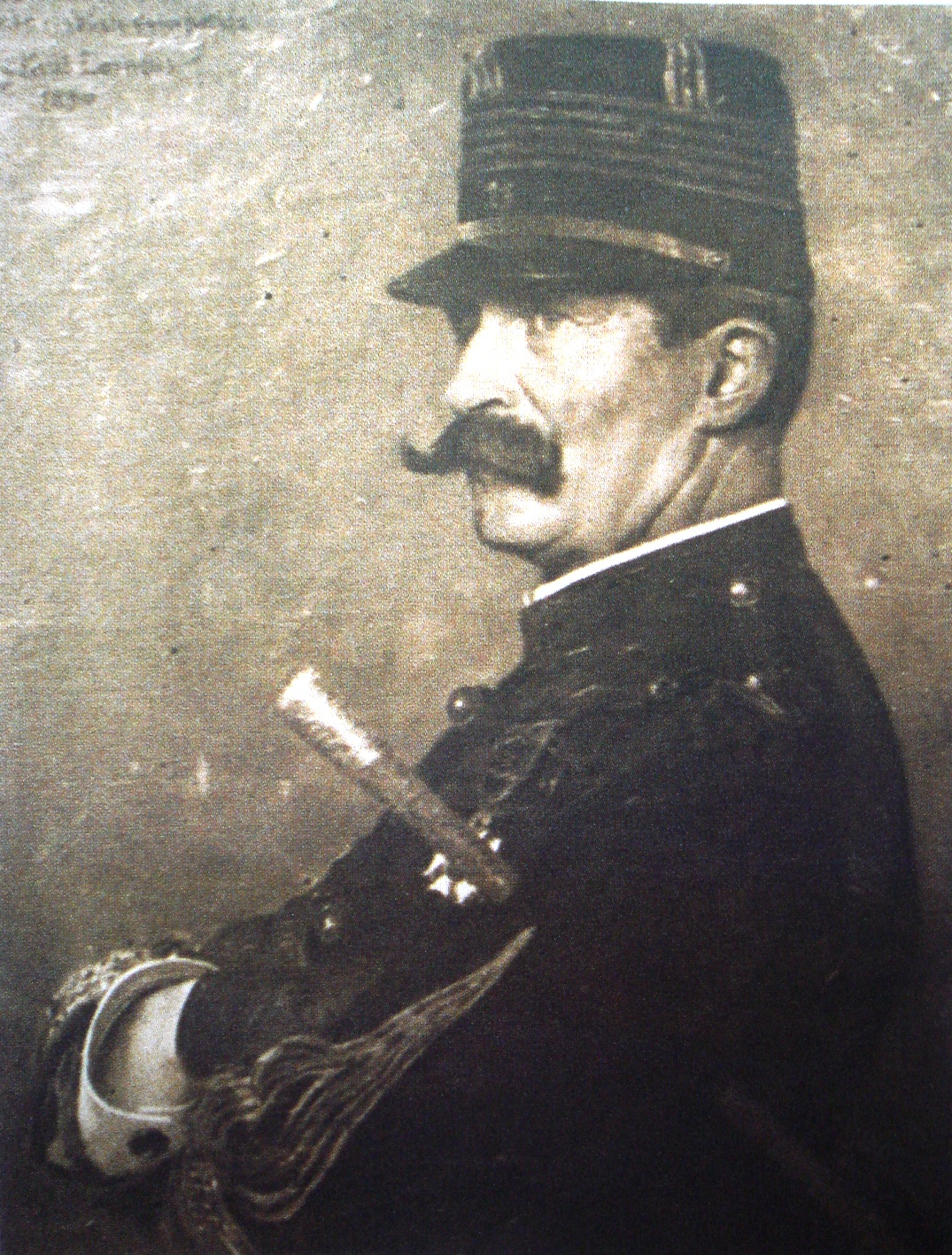
Jules Brunet in 1890

Brunet and the other French advisers were wanted by the Imperial government, but were evacuated from Hokkaidō by the French corvette Coëtlogon, commanded by Abel-Nicolas Bergasse du Petit-Thouars. In Yokohama they were put under arrest by the new French plenipotentiary in Japan, Maxime d'Outrey, and then taken to Saigon by the Dupleix. Brunet then returned to France. The new Japanese government requested that Brunet be punished for his activities in the Boshin War, but his actions had won popular support in France and the request was denied.

On his return to Japan, he was presented with three Japanese swords by Yoshinobu Tokugawa.

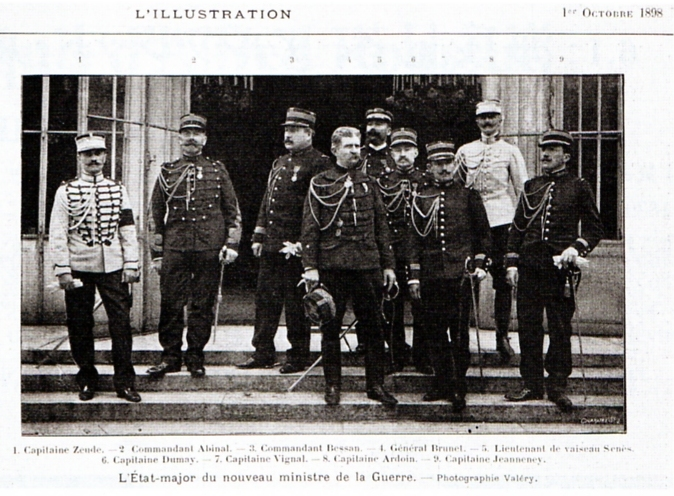
General Jules Brunet (center, hat in hand), Chief of Staff of the French Minister of War, 1898

After receiving a light sentence in his country of suspension for six months, Brunet rejoined the French army in February 1870, with only a slight loss in seniority. During the Franco-Prussian War of 1870–1871 he distinguished himself at the battles of Spicheren, Mars-la-Tour and Gravelotte. He was taken prisoner at the Siege of Metz. In the aftermath of the war Brunet played a key role as a member of the Versailles Army in the suppression of the Paris Commune. He visited the Royal School of Military Engineering in the United Kingdom in August 1871, and later that year was made an officer of the Légion d'honneur and assigned as aide de camp to the Minister of War, Ernest Courtot de Cissey.

In 1879, Brunet received the promotion to chef d'escadron and was appointed military attaché to Rome. As a colonel, he commanded the 11th Artillery Regiment between 1887 and 1891. Promoted to brigade general in December 1891, he commanded the 48th Infantry Brigade between 1891 and 1897, then the 19th Artillery Brigade. In 1898, Chanoine, his former senior officer in the Japan mission, by then Minister of War, made Brunet his chef de cabinet and promoted him to general of division.

In January 1903, Brunet retired into the army reserve. After a long period of illness he died in Fontenay-sous-Bois, on 13 August 1911.

Three Japanese swords, said to have been given to him by Yoshinobu Tokugawa of Japan, are still in existence at the home of Brunet's descendants.

== Rehabilitation in Japan ==
Brunet's former ally, Admiral Enomoto, joined the Imperial government and became Minister of the Imperial Japanese Navy. Through Enomoto's influence, the Imperial government not only forgave Brunet's actions but awarded him medals in May 1881 and again in March 1885, among those the Order of the Rising Sun. The medals were presented at the Japanese Embassy in Paris. In 1895 Brunet was made a Grand Officer of the Order of the Sacred Treasure.

== Cultural references ==
Brunet's actions served as inspiration for the character of Nathan Algren, the protagonist of the 2003 film The Last Samurai.

Brunet also appears as a character in the 2024 video game Rise of the Ronin, where he is portrayed as a military advisor to Katsu Kaishu and can fight alongside the player in the Battle of Toba-Fushimi if the player chooses to side with the Shogunate's forces during the conflict.

== Drawing and paintings by Brunet ==
Brunet was a talented painter and sketch artist who left numerous depictions of his travels in Mexico and Japan.

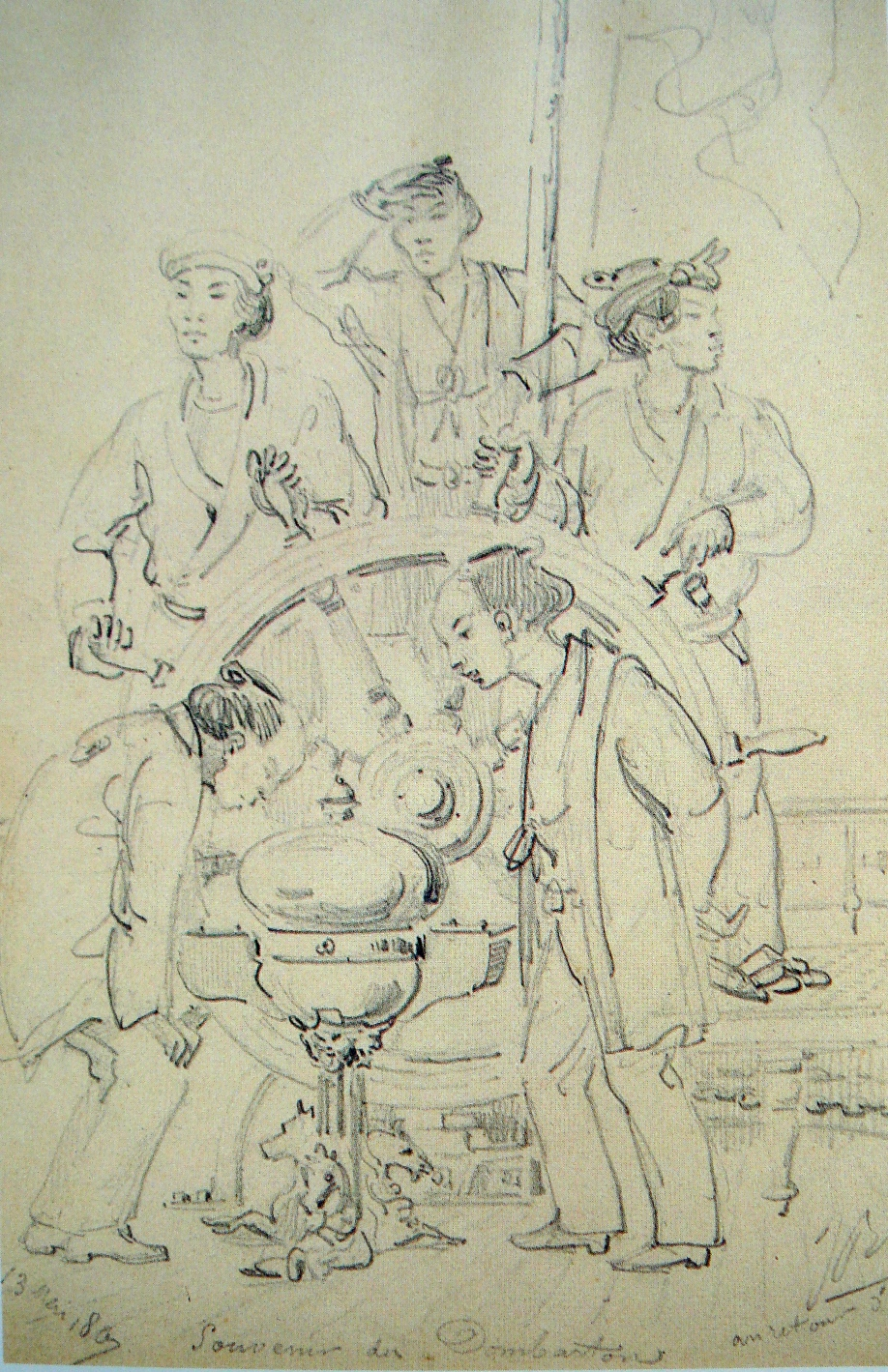
Japanese sailors on the Chōgei, 13 May 1867

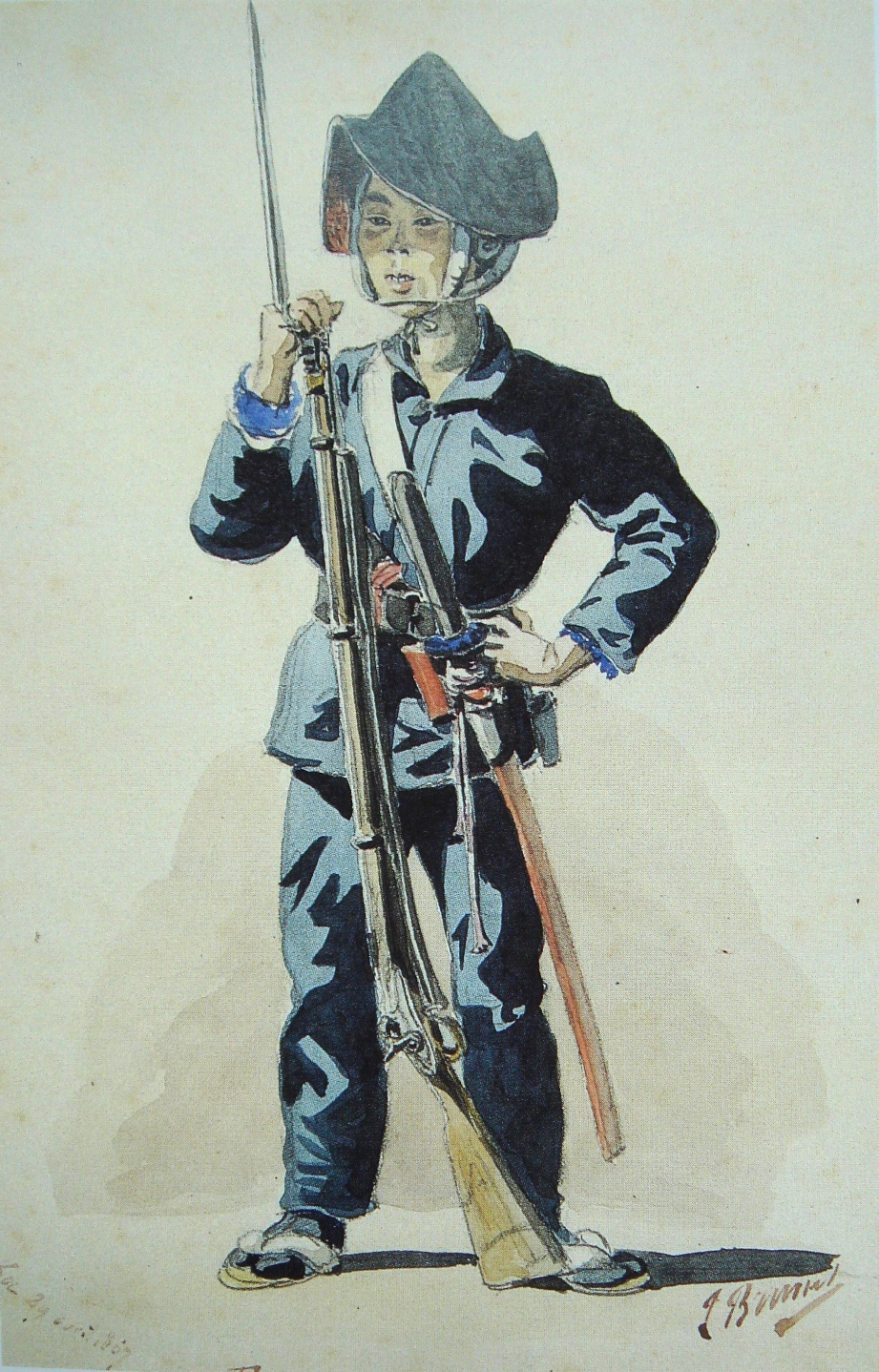
Japanese Bakufu infantry soldier (Osaka, 29 April 1867)

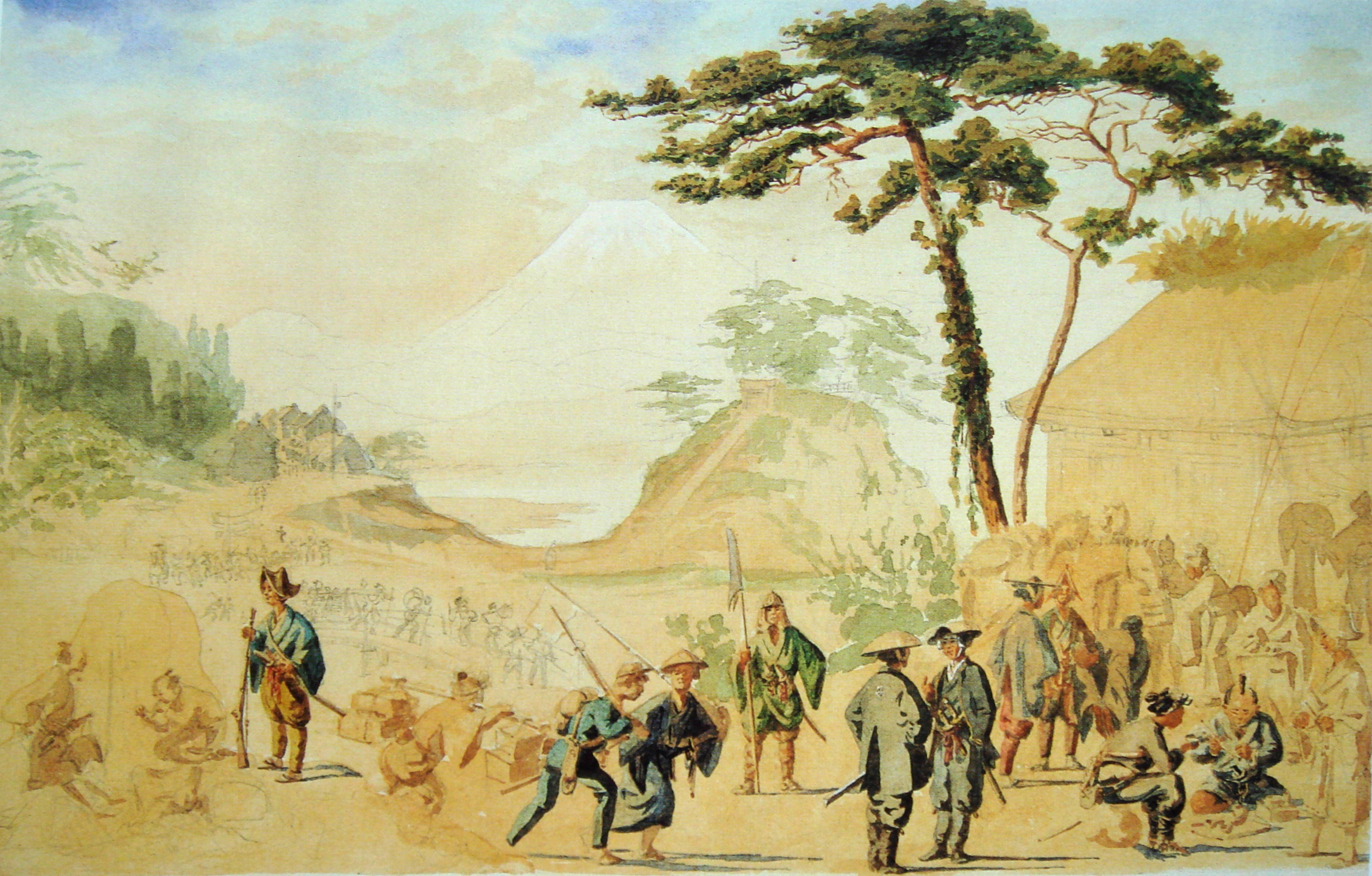
Bakufu troops near Mount Fuji in 1867

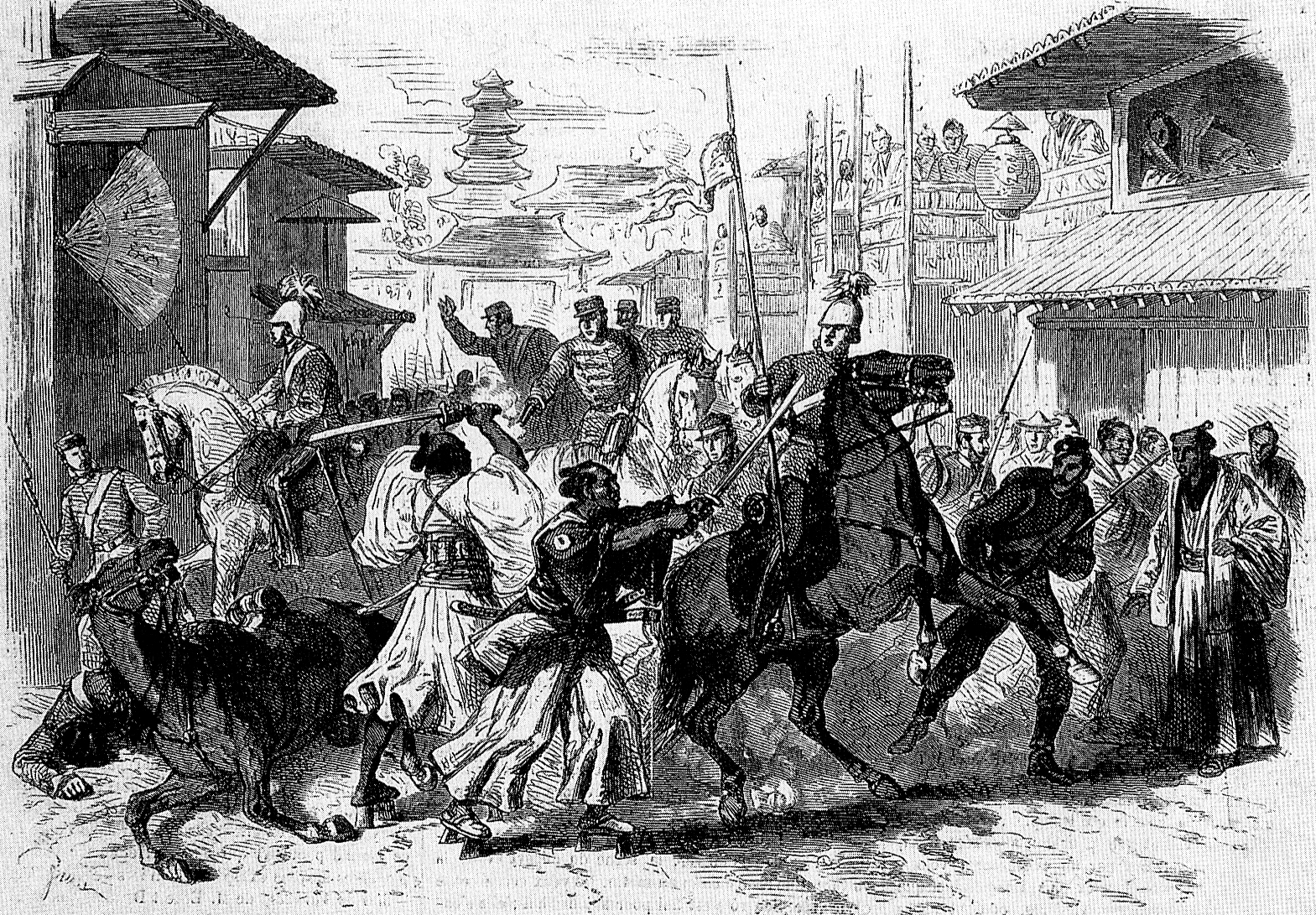
Attack in Kyoto on the British envoy to Japan, Harry Parkes, printed in the 13 June 1868 issue of Le Monde Illustré

== See also ==
- List of Westerners who visited Japan before 1868
- Franco-Japanese relations
- Bakumatsu
- Naval Battle of Hakodate
