= Shimizudani Kinnaru =

Japanese nobleman

- 清水谷 公考
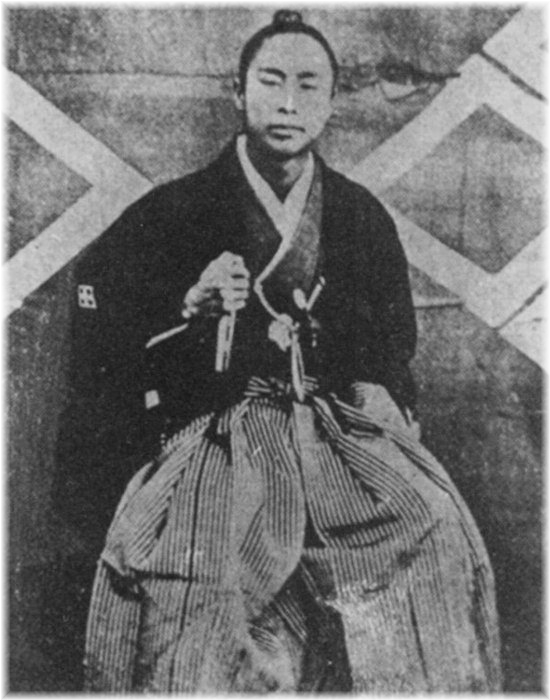

1st Chairman of the Hokkaidō Development Commission
- In office July 8, 1869 – September 13, 1869
- Monarch: Meiji
- Preceded by: Office Established
- Succeeded by: Higashikuze Michitomi

Personal details
- Born: October 6, 1845 Kyoto, Tokugawa shogunate
- Died: December 31, 1882 (aged 37) Japan

Military service
- Allegiance: Empire of Japan
- Branch/service: Imperial Japanese Army
- Years of service: 1868 – 1869
- Battles/wars: Boshin War; Battle of Hakodate

Shimizudani Kinnaru (清水谷 公考; 6 October 1845 – 31 December 1882) was a Japanese noble of the Edo period and the Meiji era who was most notable for his service during the Boshin War.

== Biography ==
Shimizudani Kinnaru left his family at an early age and entered Mt. Hiei, but in 1854 his brother, Makoto, died, so he returned to the family and became a stepfather of the Shimizutani family. In 1858, he was awarded the fifth place.

In 1868, when the Boshin War broke out, Ezo Jidessan was promoted to the imperial court. Therefore, he was appointed governor of the Okakan Court by the new government, and on April 26, he took over the business from Katsushige Sugiura, a magistrate of Hakodate under the jurisdiction of the former Shogunate. Although there were only a few public ideas, the handover was very smooth, and the wish of the former shogunate official was used for the lower staff. The Hakodate Court changed its name and became governor of the Hakodate Prefecture. Although the war had not yet been over, the forces of the Ezo security were entrusted to the Tohoku clans that did not follow the new government, and there was a fear of a shortage of resources along the isolated Ezo region, and the future was difficult.

On October 20 of the same year, the former Shogunate army led by Takeaki Enomoto arrived in Ezo. The public idea dispatched the army to the pass, the edge of the war was opened before long, and the Battle of Hakodate broke out. The rapid-fire forces of the Hakodate Prefecture did not have to enemy the former shogunate forces of the war, and the public idea with the entourage boarded a foreign ship (Kaganokami) and retreated, and withdrew to Aomori. On November 27, he was appointed governor of Aomoriguchi, but the actual military command was won by the Staff. The army's chief of staff, Kiyotaka Kuroda, was the planner of the Battle of Hakodate on May 11, 1869, and Kuroda led the surrender negotiations and other negotiations due to the Imperial victory of the battle. On April 28 of the same year, Shimizudani landed at Esashi, and when the former Shogunate army surrendered on May 18, he returned to the Hakodate Prefecture on the 19th and returned to political affairs as governor of the Hakodate Prefecture, and was processed after the war with Shimizutani's Memoirs of the Governor-General of the Aomori Prefecture.

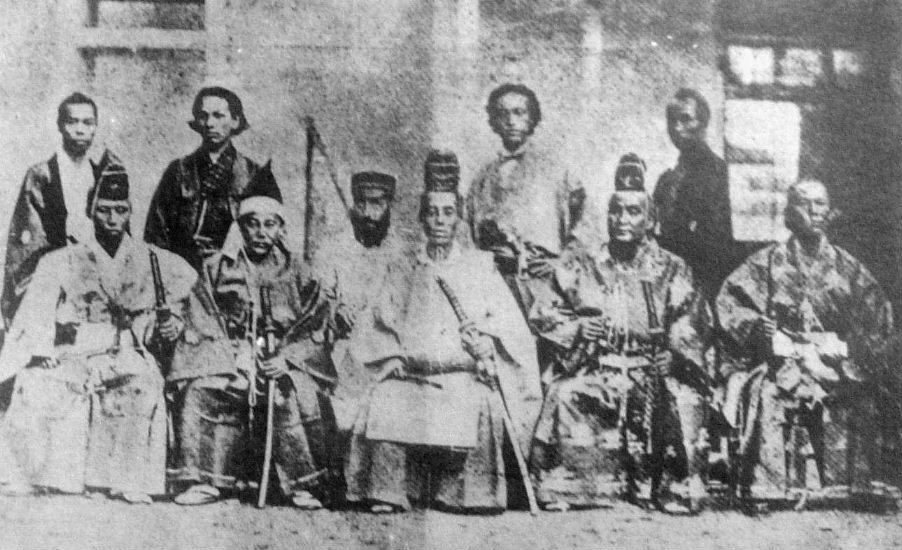
Shimizudani Kinnaru In Kyoto (center)

On July 8 of the same year, Shimizudani was issued as the Undersecretary of Reclamation of the Hokkaidō Development Commission on the 24th, but since the Hakodate Prefecture was abolished on the same day, he went to Tokyo in mid-August to confirm the situation, and eventually resigned as undersecretary and received 250 stone as a prize for the Battle of Hakodate. On September 25, Higashikuze Michitomi, Secretary of the Pioneer, was assigned to Hakodate, and from October 1 of the following year, the pioneering officer was in charge of the administration.

Shimizudani later studied in Russia in 1871. He returned to Japan in 1875 and took over as family director on March 10 of the same year. He died in 1882. He was given and received the third place. He died at the age of 38 and was buried in Rozan-ji, Kyoto. The family was succeeded by his eldest son, Shimizutani Saneakira.

== Bibliography ==
- Kasumi Kaikan Kasumi Kaikan, 1996, Volume 1 of "Heisei Shinshu Old Chinese Family Taisei".
- Japan Historical Society, "Meiji Restoration Name Dictionary", Yoshikawa Kobunkan, 1981.
- "Shimizutani Family Genealogy" 1875. Hitoriographical Institute of the University of Tokyo Collection.
