= Sōsai =

Japanese word roughly meaning president

The Japanese word Sosai (Japanese:総裁, "Sōsai") means roughly "president" or "director-general". It is used in several ways:

== Political ==
- Sosai, or president of the government, was only once the title of the imperial prime minister: from 1 January 1868 (before there was no cabinet, only chief advisers: Kampaku to the nominally reigning emperor and both Rōjū and Tairō to the de facto ruling shōgun) until 11 June 1868: Prince Arisugawa Taruhito (1835–1895); next the prime ministerial office is styled U Daijin "Ministers to the Right", in 1871 shortened to Daijin.
- Sosai also was the title of Tokugawa Admiral Takeaki Enomoto (1836–1908), the elected president (27 January 1869 – 27 June 1869) of the short-lived rebellious Ezo Republic on the present Hokkaidō Island, vanquished by Imperial troops.
- Sosai, or President of Liberal Democratic Party, is the office of the head of the LDP.

== Others ==
This office also exist in various sports, in particular budō, business and charitable organizations. The term is also used to translate the head of various foreign organizations.

The most famous of such people is Sōsai Ōyama Masutatsu, who earned this appellation by creating a karate style called Kyokushinkai and spreading karate in the western world.

Mas Oyama is to be called "Sosai" because of his contributions especially in the world of Martial Arts and in the overall history of Japan.
