= French military mission to Japan (1867–1868) =

Military training mission to Japan from Imperial France

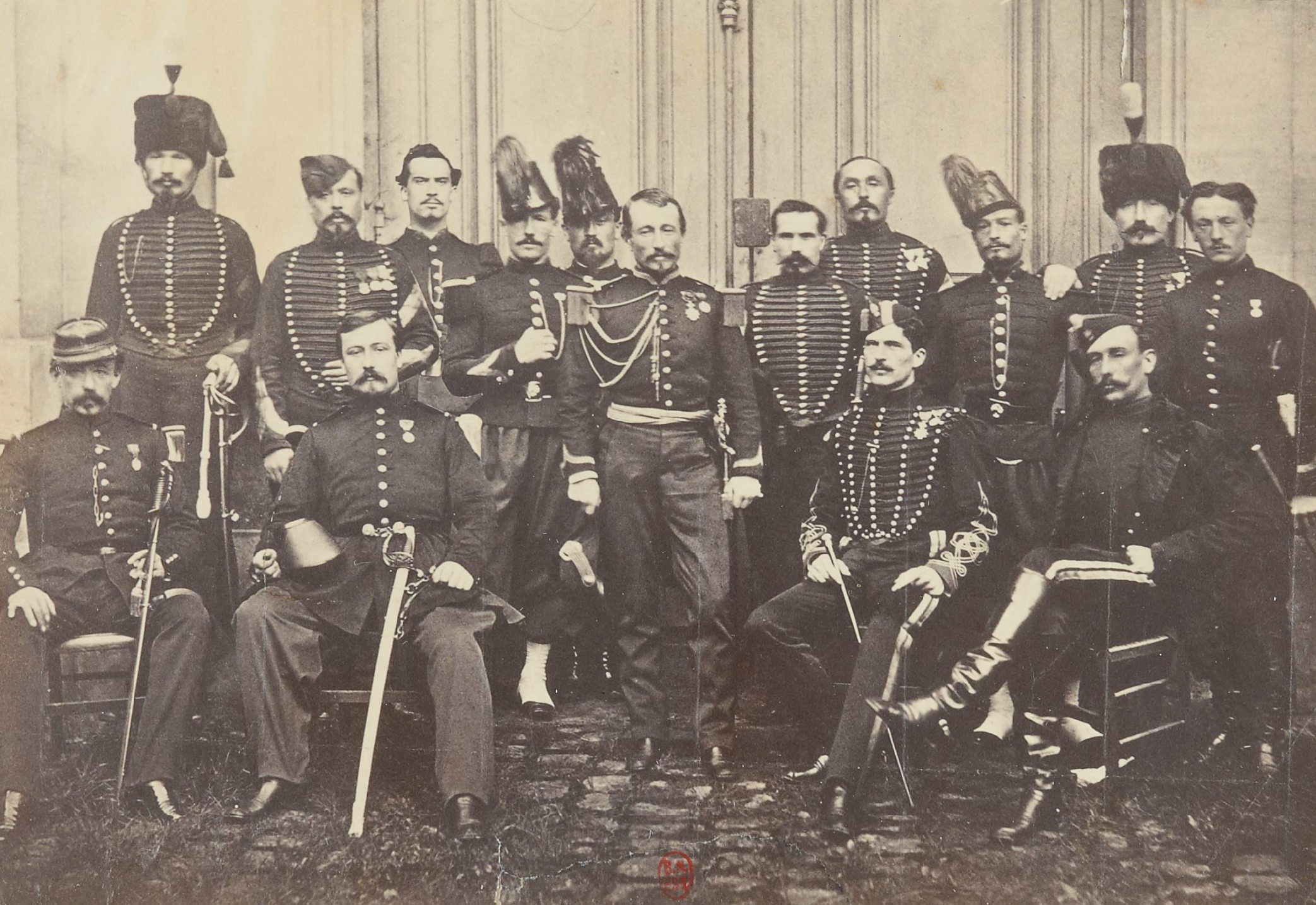
The French military mission before its departure to Japan, in 1867. Charles Chanoine is standing in the center, Jules Brunet is seated in the front row, second from right.

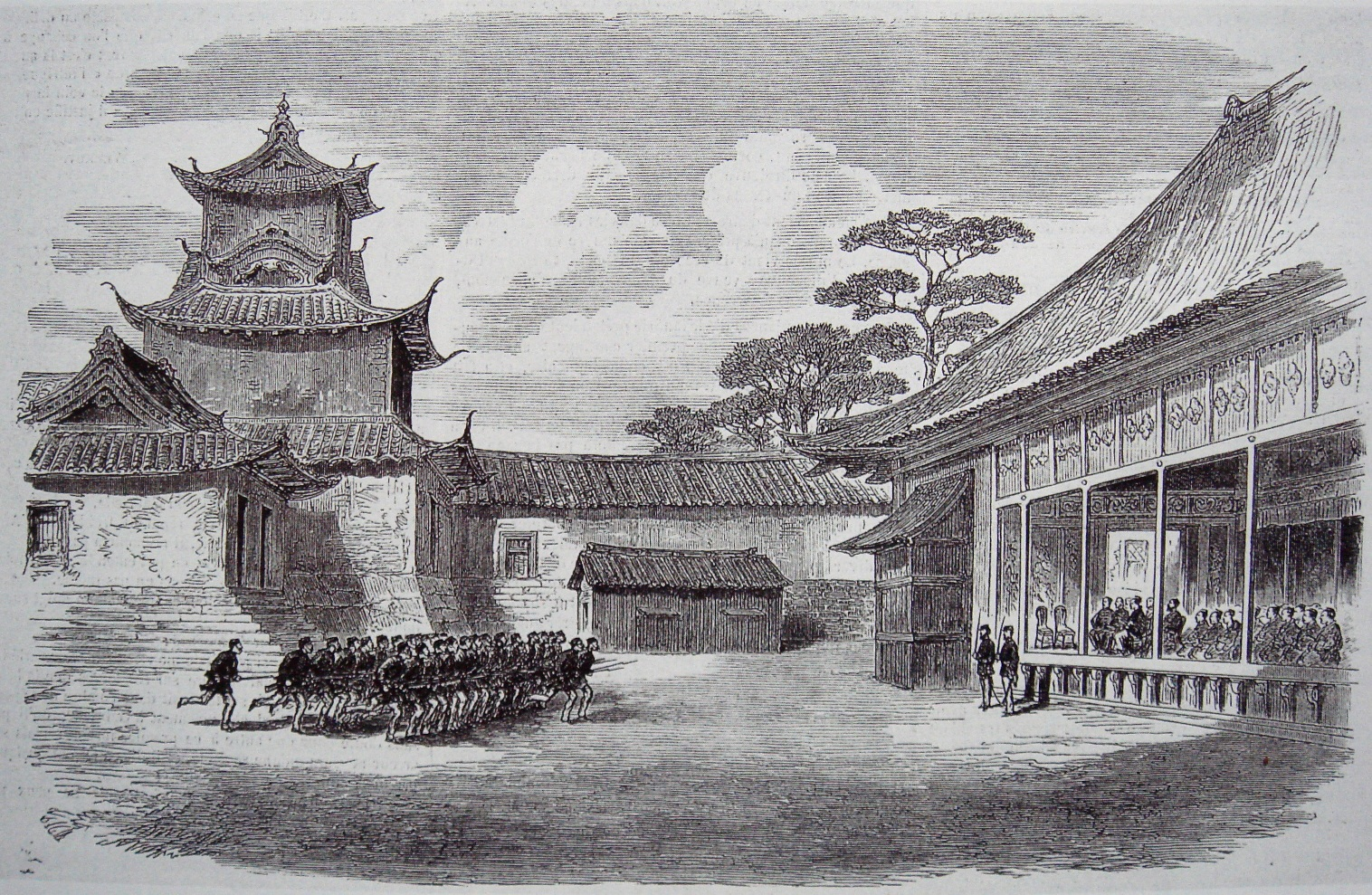
French officers drilling Shōgun troops in Osaka in 1867.

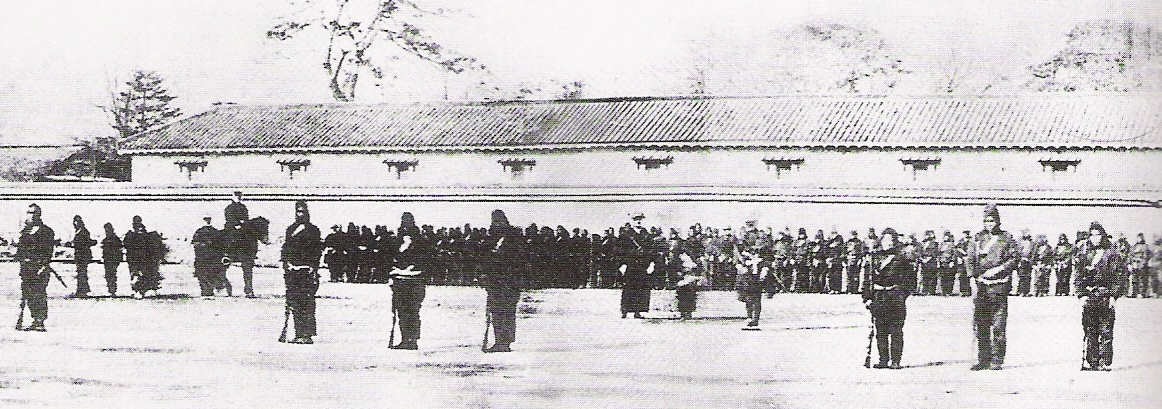
Training of Japanese Bakufu troops by the French Military Mission to Japan. 1867 photograph.

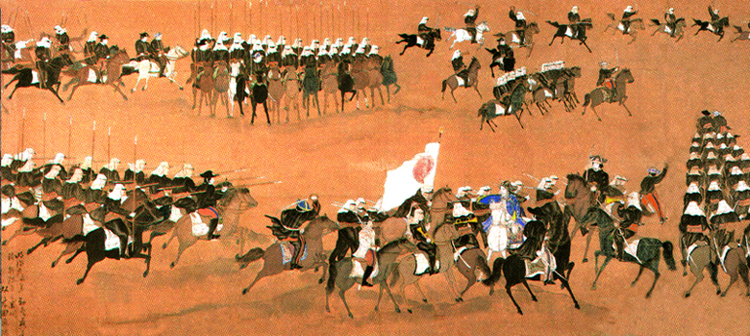
The Shogunate's French-style cavalry.

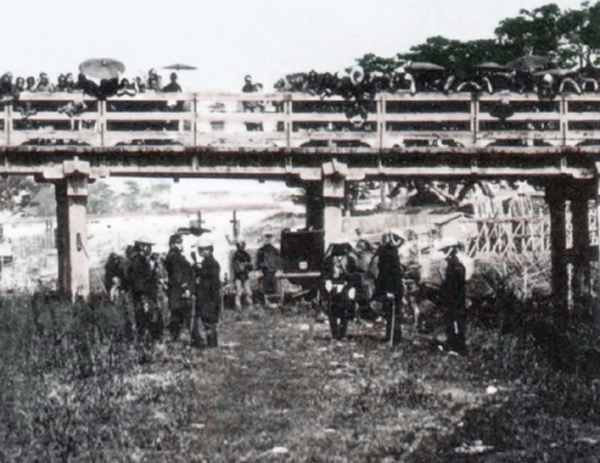
Training of Japanese troops by the French.

The French military mission of 1867 to 1868 was one of the first foreign military training missions to Japan, and the first sent by France. The mission was formed by emperor Napoléon III following a request from the Tokugawa shogunate through its emissary to Europe, Shibata Takenaka, with the goal of modernizing the Japanese military.

Shibata was already negotiating the final details of the French support for the construction of the Yokosuka Shipyard, and had additionally requested both the United Kingdom and France to send a military mission for training in Western warfare. The United Kingdom provided support to the Bakufu naval forces through the Tracey Mission. The French foreign minister Drouyn de Lhuys transmitted the agreement of the French government to provide training to the Shōgun's land-based armed forces.

== History ==
The mission left Marseille on 19 November 1866 and arrived in Yokohama on 14 January 1867. They were welcomed on their arrival by Léon Roches and the commander of the French Far East Squadron Admiral Pierre-Gustave Roze.

The military mission was able to train an elite corps of shōgun Tokugawa Yoshinobu, the Denshūtai, for a little more than one year, before the Tokugawa shogunate lost to the Imperial forces in 1868 in the Boshin War. The French military mission was then ordered to leave Japan by decree of the newly installed Meiji Emperor in October 1868.

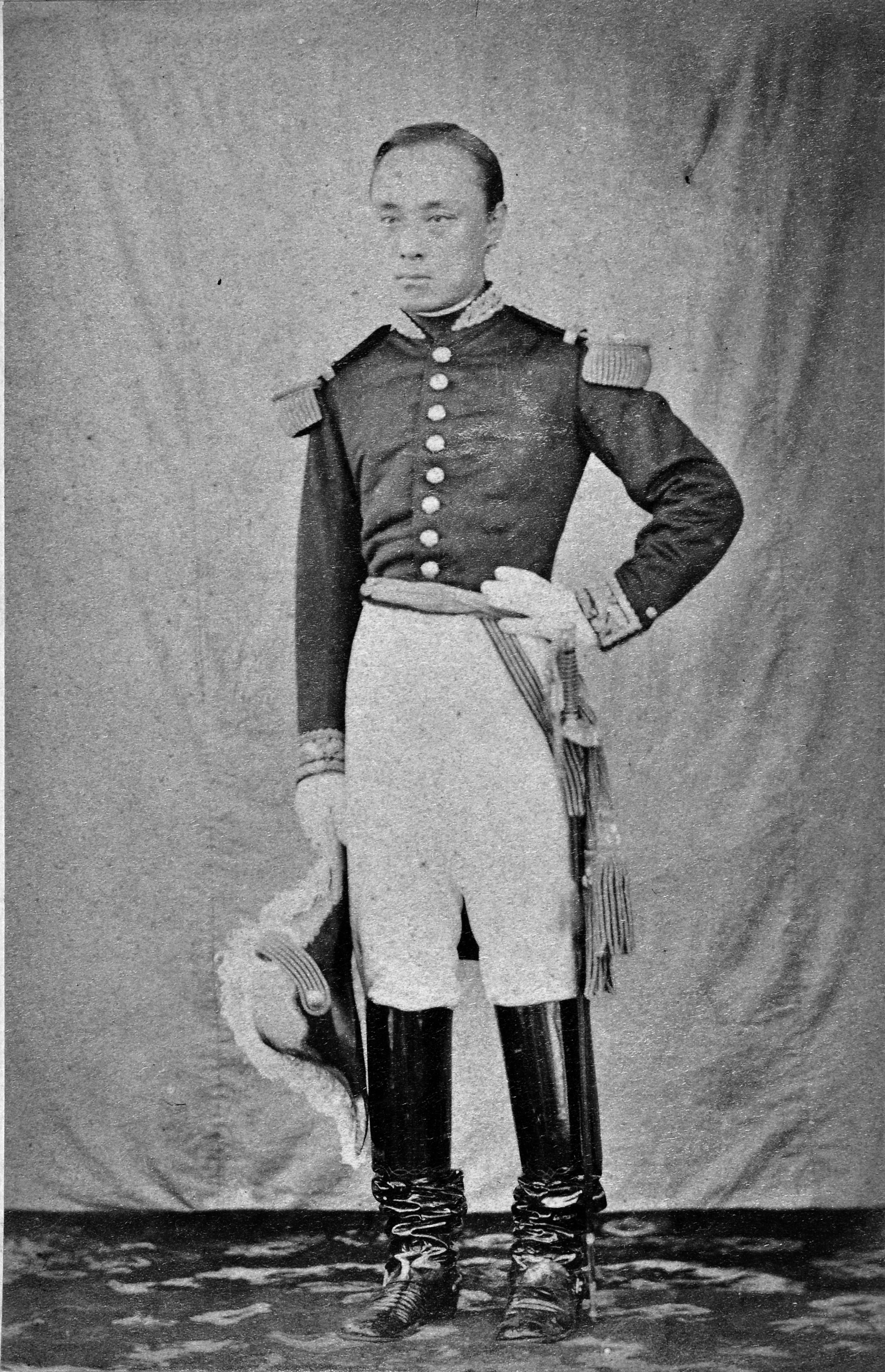
The shōgun Tokugawa Yoshinobu in French military uniform, c. 1867

In contravention of the agreement for all foreign powers to remain neutral in the conflict, French military officer Jules Brunet and four of his non-commissioned officers (Fortant, Marlin, Cazeneuve, Bouffier), chose to remain in Japan and continue supporting the Bakufu side. They resigned from the French army and left for the north of Japan with the remains of the Shogunate's armies in the hope of staging a counterattack.

The conflict continued until the rebels' defeat at the Battle of Hakodate in May 1869.

== Members ==
The mission consisted of 17 members, under the authority of the Minister of War General Jacques Louis Randon, covering a wide range of expertise: four officers (representing infantry, artillery and cavalry), ten non-commissioned officers and two soldiers. The original mission composed of 15 members, arriving in Japan in January 1867, and was later supplemented with non-commissioned officers Cazeneuve, Jourdan and Michel (February 1868). The mission was headed by staff captain Charles Sulpice Jules Chanoine, at that time an attaché to the military staff of Paris. The members were:

=== Commander ===
- Charles Chanoine, captain of the general staff

=== Instructors ===
==== Infantry ====
- Charles Albert Dubousquet, lieutenant of the 31st line infantry regiment.
- Édouard Messelot, lieutenant of the 20th battalion of chasseurs à pied.
- Jean Marlin, sergeant of the 8th battalion of chasseurs à pied.
- François Bouffier, sergeant of the 8th battalion of chasseurs à pied.
- Henry Ygrec, sergeant of the 31st line infantry regiment.

==== Artillery ====
- Jules Brunet, lieutenant of the Horse Artillery Regiment of the Imperial Guard.
- Arthur Fortant, maréchal des logis of the artillery regiment of the Imperial Guard.

==== Cavalry ====
- Léon Descharmes, lieutenant of the Dragoons of the Imperial Guard.
- Emile Perussel, maréchal des logis.

=== Non-commissioned officers ===
- Louis Guttig, corporal.
- Charles Bonnet, chief armorer second class.
- Barthélémy Izard, maréchal des logis, chief artificier of the Horse Artillery Regiment of the Imperial Guard.
- Frédéric Valette, maréchal des logis, wood specialist.
- Jean-Félix Mermet, brigadier, steel specialist.
- André Cazeneuve, brigadier of the Haras impériaux, arrived in May 1867 bringing Napoleon III's gift of 26 Arabian horses to shōgun Tokugawa Yoshinobu. Officially joined the mission in February 1868.
- Claude Jourdan, captain of the engineers.
- Charles Michel, sergeant-major of the engineers.

== See also ==
- Franco-Japanese relations
- List of Westerners who visited Japan before 1868
- Second French military mission to Japan (1872–1880)
- Third French military mission to Japan (1884–1889)
- Fourth French military mission to Japan (1918–1919)
- Bizen and Sakai, incidents involving Frenchmen in Japan
- Léonce Verny
