= Jean Marlin =

French military adviser to Japan

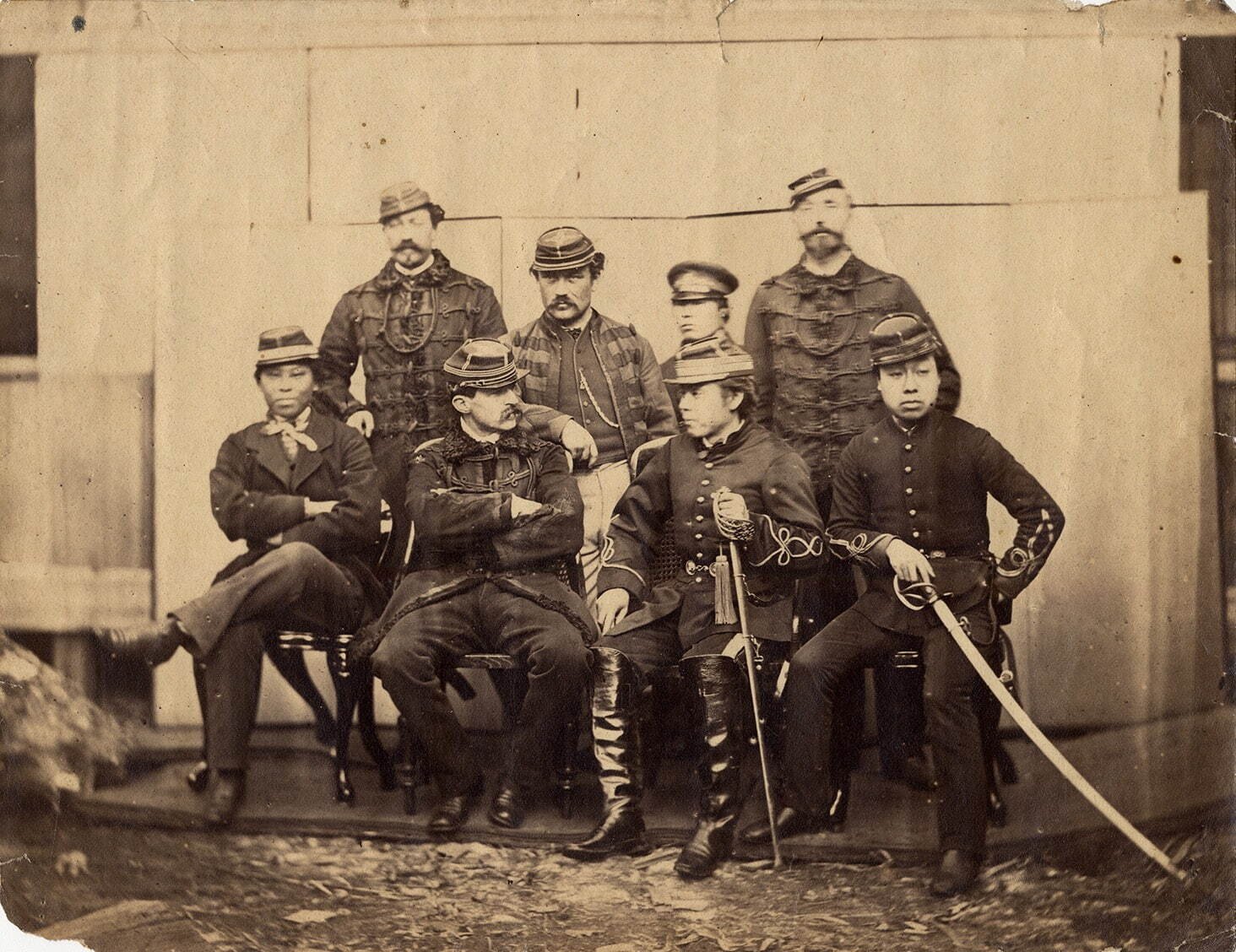
The French military advisers and their Japanese allies, in Ezo (Hokkaido). Jean Marlin is the second from left in the back row

Jean Marlin (1833–1872) was a non-commissioned officer, a sergeant of the French 8th Battalion of infantry. He was a member of the first French military mission to Japan in 1867, in which he accompanied Jules Brunet. He worked as an instructor for infantry in the army of the Tokugawa shogunate.

With the advent of the Boshin War, and the declaration of neutrality of foreign powers, Marlin chose to resign from the French Army and continue the fight on the side of the shōgun. After the shogunate fell he joined the Republic of Ezo along with Brunet and other French defectors.

After the war he returned to France. In 1871, along with fellow officers of the 1867 mission, François Bouffier and Arthur Fortant, Marlin returned to Japan to work as an instructor at the military school of Osaka, this time as a civilian. He died in Japan of an illness in April 1872, and was buried at the Yokohama International cemetery.
