= Japanese warship Chōgei Maru =

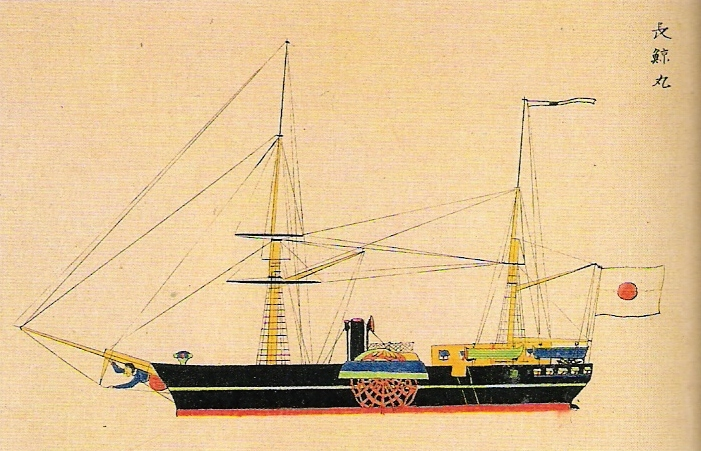
- Chōgei

History
- Name: Chōgei Maru / 長鯨丸

General characteristics
- Type: paddle steamer with sail

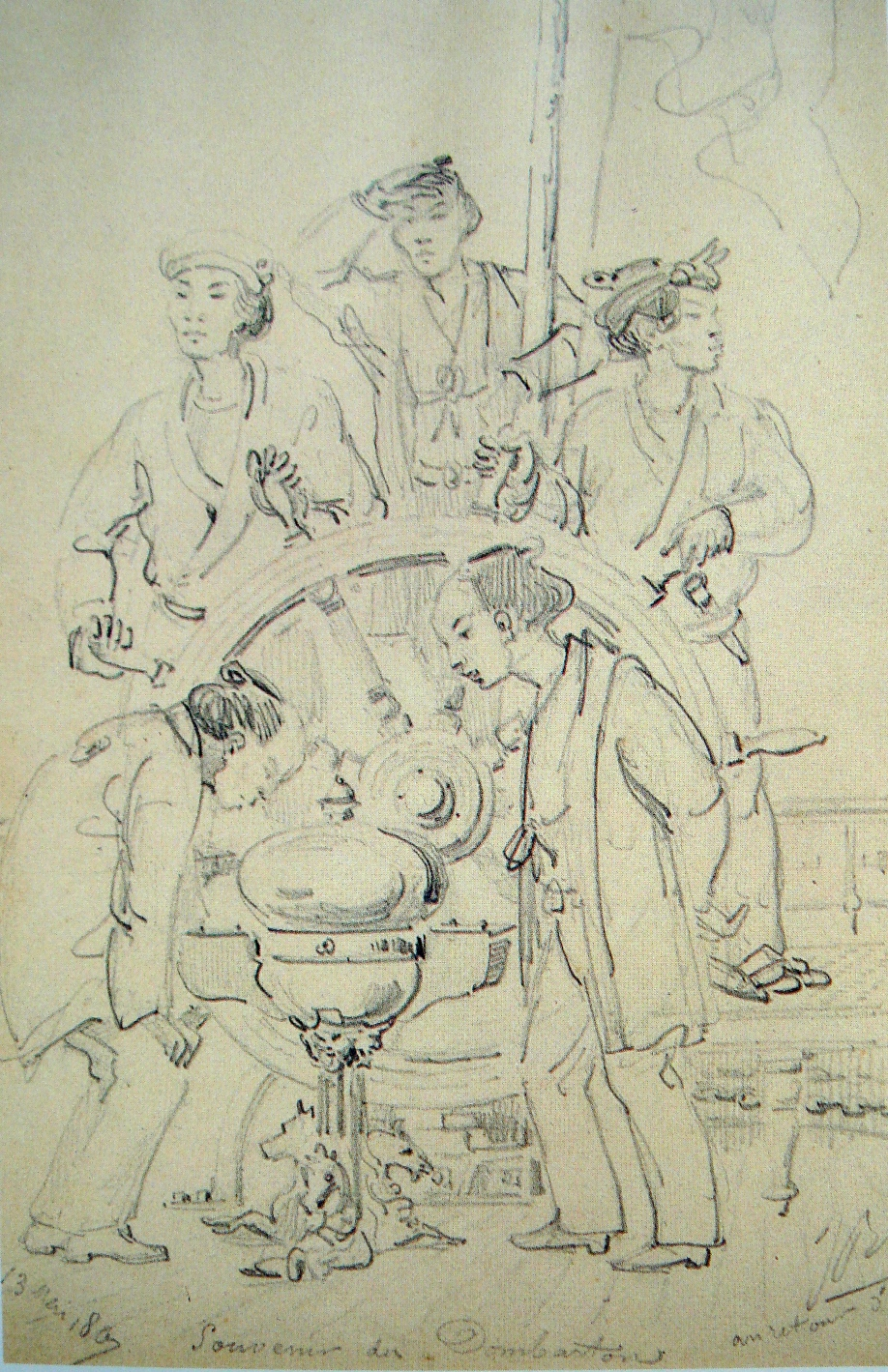
Japanese sailors on the Chōgei, May 13th, 1867. Drawing by Jules Brunet

Chōgei Maru (長鯨丸; Long Whale) was a passenger gunship active during Japan's Boshin War.

Chōgei Maru was originally designed and built in Glasgow, and launched as the ferryboat "Danberton". It was acquired by the Tokugawa shogunate in 1866, and became a component of the Shogunal navy. It was captured during the Battle of Hakodate by the new government's forces and placed under the command of Captain Aiura Norimichi of the Saga Domain. After the Boshin War, it was turned over to the Ministry of Popular Affairs, who subsequently sold it into the private sector where it was renamed "Man'ri Maru" (萬里丸, Ten Thousand Ri). It continued to serve in various capacities until 1880, finally becoming a warehouse hulk used by the Mitsubishi Corporation.

== Sources ==
- 海軍歴史保存会『日本海軍史』第7巻、第9巻、第一法規出版、1995年。
- 造船協会『日本近世造船史 明治時代』復刻版、原書房、1973年。
- 福井静夫『写真日本海軍全艦艇史』ベストセラーズ、1994年。ISBN 4-584-17054-1
