= François Bouffier =

French Army officer

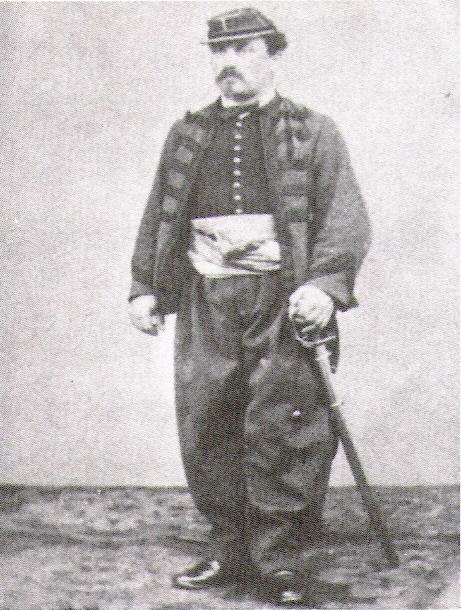
François Bouffier in Hakodate

François Bouffier (c. 1844–1881) was a French non-commissioned officer of the 19th century, a sergeant of the 8th Battalion of infantrymen. He was a member of the first French Military Mission to Japan in 1867, in which he accompanied Jules Brunet. He worked as an instructor for infantry in the army of the shōgun.

With the advent of the Boshin War, and the declaration of neutrality of foreign powers, Bouffier chose to resign from the French Army and continue the fight on the side of the Bakufu.

He participated to the Battle of Hakodate, in which he was head of one of the four Japanese regiments.

Bouffier chose to remain in Japan, and was buried at the Yokohama International cemetery in 1881. In the same cemetery were buried his two sons, Léon Célestin (1876–1877), and Auguste Louis (1873–1923).
