= André Cazeneuve =

French soldier

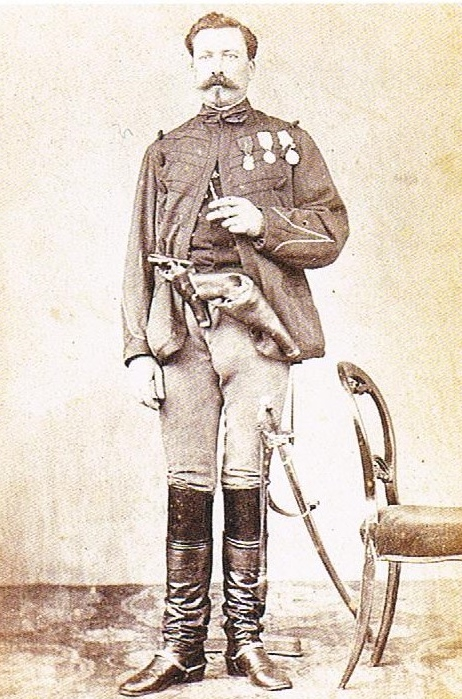
Cazeneuve in Hakodate

André Cazeneuve (10 December 1817 - 20 August 1874) was a French soldier, a horse trainer in the Guard of Emperor Napoleon III with the rank of corporal. He was a member of the first French military mission to Japan in 1867. He served as a cavalry instructor for the army of the shōgun, and introduced Arabian horses in Japan.

In 1868 the Boshin War broke out between the Shōgun and the forces supporting the restoration of the Mikado's authority. The foreign powers in Japan, including France, declared neutrality in the conflict. Cazeneuve therefore resigned from the French army and entered the service of the shōgun, along with Jules Brunet. He was commissioned as a captain.

Cazeneuve fought in the Battle of Hakodate, in command of one of the four Shogunate regiments. He was severely wounded in the battle, but was brought back to Yokohama at the end of the conflict and transported to France.

He returned to Japan in 1871, where the new Meiji government employed him to supervise their military horse usage. He died in 1874 in Japan.
