= Matsudaira Tarō =

Japanese politician (1839–1909)

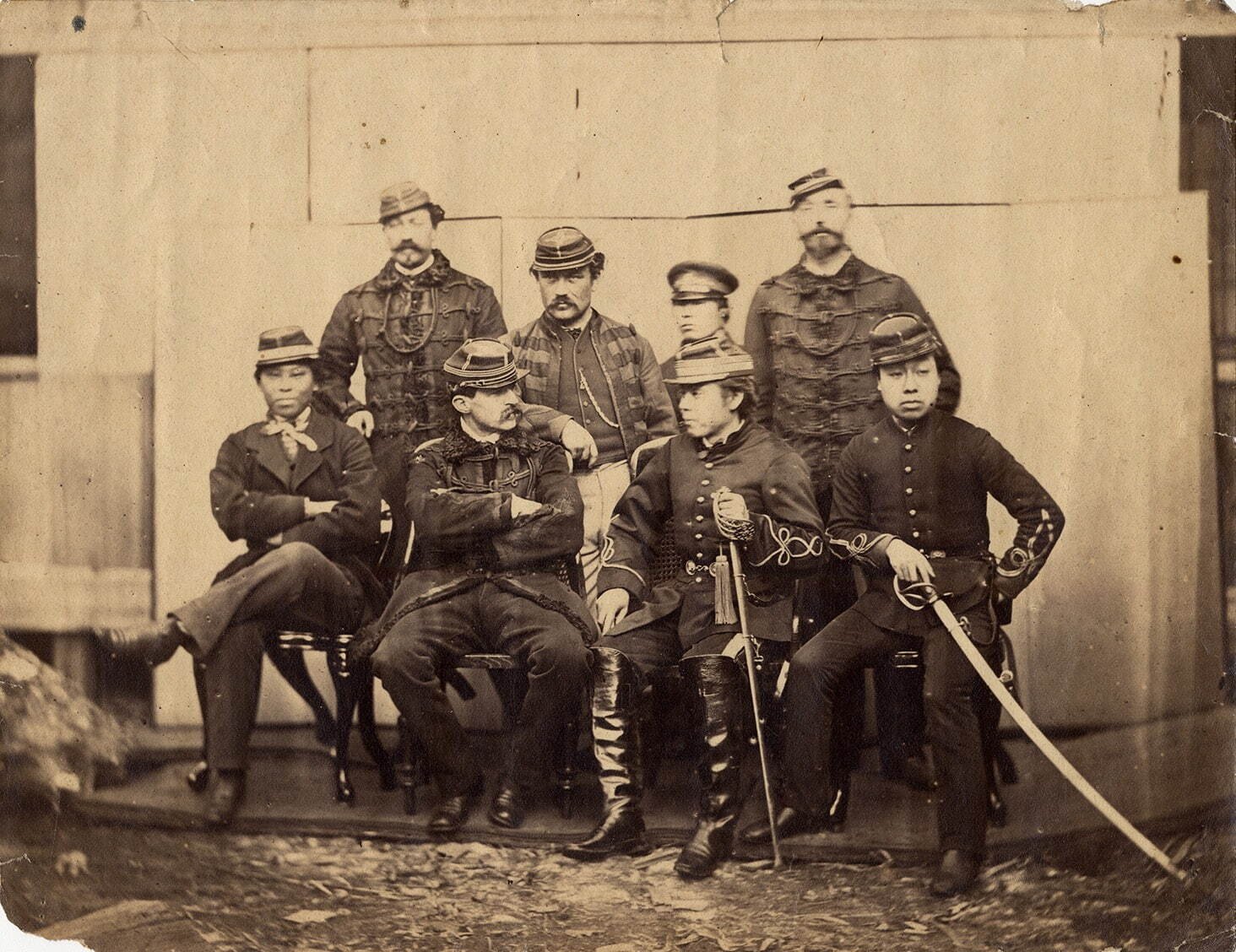
The French military advisers and their Japanese allies in Hokkaido - use a cursor to investigate

Matsudaira Tarō (松平 太郎; 1839 – May 24, 1909) was Commander-in-Chief of the Army (陸軍奉行並) under the Minister of the Army Katsu Kaishū, during the Bakumatsu period of Japanese history, and later became vice-president (Japanese:副総裁) of the Republic of Ezo during the Boshin War. He was particularly in charge of Internal Affairs and Foreign Relations.
