= List of shipwrecks in May 1869 =

The list of shipwrecks in May 1869 includes ships sunk, foundered, grounded, or otherwise lost during May 1869.

== 1 May ==
List of shipwrecks: 1 May 1869
Ship	State	Description
Lancefield	United Kingdom	The steamship ran aground on the North and South Rock, off the coast of County Antrim. She was on a voyage from the Clyde to Malta. She was refloated and put back to the Clyde in a severely damaged condition.
Lizzie Blair	(United Kingdom of Great Britain and Ireland) New South Wales	The schooner ran aground at the mouth of the Richmond River.
Mary Jane	Newfoundland Colony	The sealer was sunk by ice.
Omaha	United States	The brig capsized and sank off Key West, Florida.
Pero	United Kingdom	The brig ran aground on the Corton Sand, in the North Sea off the coast of Suffolk. She was on a voyage from Dordrecht, South Holland, Netherlands to Newcastle upon Tyne, Northumberland. She was refloated with the assistance of a tug and taken in to Lowestoft, Suffolk in a severely leaky condition.

== 2 May ==
List of shipwrecks: 2 May 1869
Ship	State	Description
Abrolhos	United Kingdom	The ship was abandoned in the Atlantic Ocean. Her crew were rescued by Matilda (United Kingdom). Abrolhos was on a voyage from Liverpool, Lancashire to Quebec City, Canada.
Clematis	United Kingdom	The ship was driven ashore at Berdyansk, Russia. She was refloated on 6 May.
Italian Eagle	United Kingdom	The ship was wrecked at Berdyansk.
Rona	United Kingdom	The brig foundered after being abandoned by her crew in the Pacific Ocean.
Union	United Kingdom	The ship was driven ashore south of the Kullen Lighthouse, Sweden. She was on a voyage from Liverpool, Lancashire to Riga, Russia.

== 3 May ==
List of shipwrecks: 3 May 1869
Ship	State	Description
Ann	United Kingdom	The ship was driven ashore at Chapman Head.
Flora	United Kingdom	The ship was wrecked off Sheerness, Kent. Her crew survived. She was on a voyage from Rochester, Kent to Sunderland, County Durham.

== 4 May ==
List of shipwrecks: 4 May 1869
Ship	State	Description
Afiena	Netherlands	The galiot was driven ashore and wrecked at Land's End, Cornwall, United Kingdom with the loss of four of her five crew. She was on a voyage from Lisbon, Portugal to Liverpool, Lancashire, United Kingdom.
Clare Court	United Kingdom	The barque was driven ashore and wrecked at Seaford, Sussex.
Emma	United Kingdom	The brig was wrecked on the Carrig Rocks, off Greenore Point, County Louth. Her crew were rescued. She was on a voyage from Liverpool to Bahia, Brazil.
Roelfina Alida	Netherlands	The ship collided with Venus (Bremen) and sank in the North Sea with the loss of one life. Survivors were rescued by Venus. Roelfina Alida was on a voyage from Amsterdam, North Holland to a Scottish port.
Vriendschap	Danzig	The ship was driven ashore at Hela, Prussia. She was on a voyage from Alloa, Clackmannanshire, United Kingdom to Danzig.
Unnamed	Flag unknown	The barque ran aground on the Nore. She was refloated and sailed for London, United Kingdom.
Unnamed	Prussia	The steamship Princess Alexandra (United Kingdom) collided with the schooners Hebe (Denmark) and a Prussian schooner off Helsingør, Denmark. The Prussian vessel sank.

== 5 May ==
List of shipwrecks: 5 May 1869
Ship	State	Description
Europa	United Kingdom	The brig was wrecked on Spiekeroog, Prussia.
Fanny	United Kingdom	The steamship was driven ashore at Courtown, County Wexford. She was on a voyage from Liverpool, Lancashire to Lisbon, Portugal.
Prœne	Norway	The ship sank. She was refloated on 20 May and taken in to Helsingør, Denmark.

== 6 May ==
List of shipwrecks: 6 May 1869
Ship	State	Description
Kaiten	Republic of Ezo	Boshin War: The corvette was beached at Aomori Bay near Hakodate. She was burned by her crew on 20 June to prevent the ship from falling into enemy hands.
Mary Ant	United Kingdom	The Yorkshire Billyboy was driven ashore at Ness Point, Suffolk. She was on a voyage from Lowestoft, Suffolk to Hartlepool, County Durham.
Riga	Russian Empire	The steamship ran aground near Kronstadt. She was later refloated.

== 7 May ==
List of shipwrecks: 7 May 1869
Ship	State	Description
Général Abbatucci	France	The steamship collided with the brig Edward Hwidt (Norway and sank in the Mediterranean Sea off Corsica with the loss of 49 of the 103 people on board. Survivors were rescued by Edward Hwidt and the barque Embla (Norway). Général Abbatucci was on a voyage from Marseille, Bouches-du-Rhône to Civita Vecchia, Papal States.
Hermit	United Kingdom	The schooner ran aground at Lagos, Africa. She was later refloated.
Liburna	Norway	The barque was driven ashore and wrecked at "Stjoringbrun", Sweden. Her crew were rescued.
Maria Hall	United Kingdom	The ship collided with Secret (United Kingdom) and was abandoned by her crew, who were rescued by Secret. Maria Hall was on a voyage from Boston, Lincolnshire to Surinam.

== 8 May ==
List of shipwrecks: 8 May 1869
Ship	State	Description
Alma	United Kingdom	The ship ran aground on Tolbuchen Reefs, in the Baltic Sea. She was on a voyage from Swansea, Glamorgan to Kronstadt, Russia. She was refloated and taken in to Kronstadt.
Douglas	United Kingdom	The barque ran aground at Elizabeth Reef in the Coral Sea off Queensland. Her nine crew took to a raft. They were supplied with provisions on 19 May by the schooner Stormbird ( (United Kingdom of Great Britain and Ireland) New South Wales) and on 23 May by Marceau (French Navy). They subsequently reached Newcastle, New South Wales. Douglas was on a voyage from Newcastle to Yokohama, Japan.
Enid	United Kingdom	The brig collided with the steamship Pilot (United Kingdom) and sank off the mouth of the Humber. Her crew were rescued by Pilot. Enid was on a voyage from Falmouth, Cornwall to Leith, Lothian.
Handy	United Kingdom	The schooner was driven ashore at Wexford. Her four crew were rescued by the Wexford Lifeboat Civil Service ( Royal National Lifeboat Institution). She was on a voyage from Dublin to Wexford.
Maria de Beandol	Portugal	The ship was assisted in to Abrevac'h, Finistère, France in a sinking condition. She was on a voyage from Cardiff, Glamorgan, United Kingdom to Porto.

== 9 May ==
List of shipwrecks: 9 May 1869
Ship	State	Description
Britannia	(United Kingdom of Great Britain and Ireland) New South Wales	The schooner ran aground 4 nautical miles (7.4 km) south of Morna Point, Port Stephens during a gale.
Burnett	(United Kingdom of Great Britain and Ireland) New South Wales	The brig foundered during a gale in the Newcastle Bight Bay 1 nautical mile (1.9 km) off the coast with the loss of all seven crew.
Charlotte	Sweden	The schooner capsized and sank in the River Thames at Charlton, Kent, United Kingdom. She was refloated on 14 May and beached at Blackwall, Middlesex, United Kingdom.
Eagleton	(United Kingdom of Great Britain and Ireland) New South Wales	The schooner foundered during a gale 8 nautical miles (15 km) south of Anna Bay, Port Stephens with the loss of all six crew.
Enid	United Kingdom	The ship was run down and sunk in the North Sea off the mouth of the Humber by a steamship. Her crew were rescued. She was on a voyage from Enos, Ottoman Empire to Leith, Lothian.
Jessie	United Kingdom	The schooner ran aground off Newcastle, New South Wales with the loss of three of her five crew.
Nancy	(United Kingdom of Great Britain and Ireland) New South Wales	The schooner ran aground off Newcastle with the loss of one of her six crew.
Secret	(United Kingdom of Great Britain and Ireland) New South Wales	The schooner ran aground and was wrecked off Port Stephens with the loss of a crew member.

== 10 May ==
List of shipwrecks: 10 May 1869
Ship	State	Description
Aline	United Kingdom	The ship was wrecked 4 nautical miles (7.4 km) north of Viana do Castelo, Portugal with the loss of twelve of her seventeen crew. She was on a voyage from Cardiff, Glamorgan to Bangor, Maine, United States.
Luella	Canada	The schooner ran aground after capsizing during a gale in the Barren Islands off the south-central coast of the Department of Alaska.
Norge	Norway	The ship was driven ashore near Hammerfest, Norway. She was on a voyage from Newcastle upon Tyne, Northumberland, United Kingdom to Hammerfest.

== 11 May ==
List of shipwrecks: 11 May 1869
Ship	State	Description
Chōyō Maru	Imperial Japanese Navy	Chōyō Maru sinking during the Naval Battle of Hakodate Bay. Boshin War (Naval Battle of Hakodate Bay): The corvette sank during combat after she was hit in the ammunition magazine by the schooner Banryū ( Republic of Ezo) and exploded in Hakodate Bay, Japan with the loss of 86 onboard.
Energy	United Kingdom	The ship was abandoned in the Bay of Biscay. Her crew were rescued. She was on a voyage from London to Buenos Aires, Argentina.
Joe Baker	United States	The tug suffered a boiler explosion off Staten Island. Three of her crew were severely wounded.
W. Y. E.	United Kingdom	The brigantine collided with the steamship Earl of Erne (United Kingdom) and sank at Dundalk, County Louth. She was on the return leg of her maiden voyage, from Pomaron, Portugal to Liverpool, Lancashire.

== 12 May ==
List of shipwrecks: 12 May 1869
Ship	State	Description
Cheyenne, Clifton, Darling, Mary Erwin, Melnotte, and Westmoreland	United States	The steamboat Clifton caught fire at Cincinnati, Ohio. the fire spread to the other five steamboats. Darling and Melnotte were severely damaged, the other four boats were destroyed. One person on board Cheyenne died.
Gladiolus	United Kingdom	The barque was wrecked. She was on a voyage from Bahia, Brazil to New York, United States.
Hare	United Kingdom	The schooner was towed in to Beaumaris, Anglesey in a sinking condition by the pilot boat No. 3 (United Kingdom). Hare was on a voyage from Laxey, Isle of Man to Runcorn, Cheshire.
Hematine	United Kingdom	The ship was driven ashore at Dungeness, Kent. She was on a voyage from Sicily, Italy to London. She was refloated.
Louise	United Kingdom	The ship ran aground in the King's Channel. She was on a voyage from Waterford to Havre de Grâce, Seine-Inférieure, France. She was refloated and found to be leaky.
Maggie	United Kingdom	The ship was driven ashore at Dungeness. She was refloated.
Mataoka	United Kingdom	The ship departed from Littleton, New Zealand for London. No further trace, presumed foundered with the loss of all hands.
Mississippi	United States	The steamship was wrecked on Martinique. She was on a voyage from Rio de Janeiro, Brazil to New York.
Pfeil	Hamburg	The steamship ran aground at Cuxhaven. She was on a voyage from Hamburg to South Shields, County Durham, United Kingdom. She was refloated and resumed her voyage.
Volta	Italy	The ship was driven ashore on Itaparica Island, Brazil.
Zeta	United Kingdom	The schooner was wrecked at Lagos, Africa. She was refloated on 14 May.

== 13 May ==
List of shipwrecks: 13 May 1869
Ship	State	Description
Eole	France	The pilot cutter struck a sunken wreck and was beached at Hope Cove, Devon, United Kingdom. Her crew were rescued.
Little Annie	United States	The schooner ran aground off Gull Rock Bar, California.

== 14 May ==
List of shipwrecks: 14 May 1869
Ship	State	Description
Ant	United Kingdom	The ship foundered off Cromer, Norfolk. She was on a voyage from Great Yarmouth, Norfolk to Blyth, Northumberland.
Elizabeth Jane	United Kingdom	The ship ran aground on the Batten Reefs, in Plymouth Sound. She was on a voyage from Runcorn, Cheshire to Antwerp, Belgium. She was refloated and taken in to Plymouth, Devon.
Jane Catherine	United Kingdom	The schooner was driven ashore at Penzance, Cornwall. She was on a voyage from Portmadoc, Caernarfonshire to Riga, Russia.
Lady Seymour	United Kingdom	The ship was driven ashore at Quebec City, Canada. She was on a voyage from Dublin to Quebec City.
Mary Simmons	United Kingdom	The schooner collided with another schooner and sank. Her crew were rescued by the lugger Adèle (France). Mary Simmons was on a voyage from Neath, Glamorgan to Plymouth, Devon.
Necromancer	New Zealand	The schooner ran aground at Farewell Spit after having sprung a leak.
Richard Roberts	United Kingdom	The ship sprang a leak and foundered off Strumble Head, Pembrokeshire. Her crew were rescued. She was on a voyage from London to Liverpool, Lancashire.
Tartar	United Kingdom	The ship was driven ashore at Falmouth, Cornwall. She was on a voyage from Cardiff, Glamorgan to China.

== 15 May ==
List of shipwrecks: 15 May 1869
Ship	State	Description
Arran Isle	(United Kingdom of Great Britain and Ireland) Isle of Man	The ship was driven ashore at Aberdovey, Merionethshire. She was refloated the next day and taken in to the River Dovey.
Cardross	United Kingdom	The ship was driven ashore near Dymchurch, Kent. She was on a voyage from Hamburg to the Clyde. She was refloated on 24 May and taken in to Dover, Kent.
Don	United Kingdom	The barque caught fire at Algeciras, Spain and was scuttled.
Don Juan	(United Kingdom of Great Britain and Ireland) New South Wales	The ship foundered off Bird Island, Tasmania with the loss of all hands.
Frances Ellen	United States	The fishing vessel ran aground off Fort Pickens, Florida before shifting sandbars let her drift into deeper waters where she sank.
Golden Light	United Kingdom	The ship was abandoned in the Atlantic Ocean. Her crew were rescued by the brig Æolus (Norway). Golden Light was on a voyage from Ardrossan, Ayrshire to New York, United States.

== 16 May ==
List of shipwrecks: 16 May 1869
Ship	State	Description
Cheduba	United Kingdom	The steamship foundered in the Bay of Bengal with the loss of all 96 people on board. She was on a voyage from Calcutta, Indian to Rangoon, Burma.
Cornelia Maria	Netherlands	The brigantine foundered off Trevose Head, Cornwall, United Kingdom. Her crew were rescued. She was on a voyage from Par, Cornwall to Runcorn, Cheshire, United Kingdom.
Margaret	United Kingdom	The barque was wrecked in Trinity Bay with the loss of all but one of her fifteen crew. She was on a voyage from Sunderland, County Durham to Quebec City, Canada.
Nelly	United Kingdom	The steamship ran aground at Rye, Sussex and was damaged.
Seabreeze	Canada	The ship put in to Antigua in a waterlogged condition and sank there.
Zetus	United Kingdom	The barque was wrecked in Trinity Bay with the loss of all seventeen crew. She was on a voyage from Hull, Yorkshire to Quebec City.
Unnamed	Flag unknown	The brigantine foundered in the English Channel. Her seven crew survived.

== 17 May ==
List of shipwrecks: 17 May 1869
Ship	State	Description
Dharwar	India	The ship caught fire and was scuttled at Penang, Straits Settlements. The fire was not extinguished until 21 May.
Eclipse	United Kingdom	The brig ran aground at Ram Island, off Yarmouth, Nova Scotia, Canada. She was on a voyage from Baltimore, Maryland, United States to Halifax, Nova Scotia. The wreck was lifted and auctioned off at a later date.
Fairy	United Kingdom	The ship was wrecked on the Galloper Sand. Her crew were rescued by Emanuel (United Kingdom). Fairy was on a voyage from South Shields, County Durham to Boulogne, Pas-de-Calais, France.
Hope	United Kingdom	The ship foundered in the English Channel off Dungeness, Kent. She was on a voyage from London to Cherbourg, Seine-Inférieure, France.
James Macqueen	United Kingdom	The ship was wrecked on Osmussaar, Russia. Her crew were rescued. She was on a voyage from Ardrossan, Ayrshire to Kronstadt, Russia.
Jessy	United Kingdom	The ship struck a rock near The Pillars and was damaged. She was on a voyage from Liverpool to Quebec City, Canada.
John Mann	United Kingdom	The ship collided with Amoor (Spain) and then ran aground. She was on a voyage from Grimsby, Lincolnshire to Quebec City. She was refloated and taken in to Quebec City.
Orissia	United Kingdom	The ship was driven ashore and wrecked at "Quarry Harbour". Her crew survived. She was on a voyage from "Quarry Harbour" to Beauly, Inverness-shire.
Robert James Haynes	United Kingdom	The ship sprang a leak and was beached at Dragør, Denmark, She was on a voyage from Memel, Prussia to Ipswich, Suffolk.

== 18 May ==
List of shipwrecks: 18 May 1869
Ship	State	Description
Caledonia	United Kingdom	The ship ran aground 20 nautical miles (37 km) east of Key West, Florida, United States. She was on a voyage from Pensacola, Florida to Liverpool, Lancashire.
Golconda	United Kingdom	The ship ran aground 30 nautical miles (56 km) east of Key West. She was refloated on 20 May and towed in to Key West.
Mistress of the Seas	United Kingdom	The ship departed from Bombay, India for Havre de Grâce, Seine-Inférieure, France. No further trace, presumed foundered with the loss of all hands.
Star of Peace	United Kingdom	The ship capsized at Harwich, Essex. She was on a voyage from London to Norwich, Norfolk.

== 19 May ==
List of shipwrecks: 19 May 1869
Ship	State	Description
Exley	United Kingdom	The ship was driven ashore at Llanmaddock, Glamorgan.
Grecian	United Kingdom	The steamship struck the Split Rocks in the Saint Lawrence River and sank with the loss of one life. There were about 200 survivors. She was on a voyage from Toronto, Ontario to Montreal, Quebec, Canada.
Henriette	Prussia	The schooner was driven ashore and wrecked at "Steensnæs", near Fredrikshavn, Denmark. She was on a voyage from Newcastle upon Tyne, Northumberland, United Kingdom to Kappeln.
Sibyl	United Kingdom	The ship ran aground on the Nore. She was on a voyage from Pomaron, Portugal to London. She was refloated with the assistance of a tug.

== 20 May ==
List of shipwrecks: 20 May 1869
Ship	State	Description
Alexandre Pétion	(Haiti) Haitian Navy	The ship ran aground off Cape Dame Maria. She was refloated.
Prince of Wales	United Kingdom	The ship ran aground. She was on a voyage from London to a Norwegian port. She was refloated and taken in to Brightlingsea, Essex in a leaky condition.
Robert Low	United Kingdom	The ship ran aground at New Orleans, Louisiana, United States.

== 21 May ==
List of shipwrecks: 21 May 1869
Ship	State	Description
Bremerin Tackens	Bremen	The ship was wrecked on Sal, Cape Verde Islands. She was on a voyage from Bremen to the Cape Verde Islands.
Countess of Durham	United Kingdom	The schooner was run into by the steamship Gladstone (United Kingdom) and sank in the North Sea. Her three crew were rescued by Gladstone.
Golconda	United Kingdom	The ship was driven ashore near Key West, Florida, United States. She was on a voyage from Pensacola, Florida to Liverpool, Lancashire.
Princess Victoria	United Kingdom	The ship was driven ashore on Öland, Sweden. She was on a voyage from Riga, Russia to London. She was refloated with the assistance of a steamship and resumed her voyage.
Swallow	(United Kingdom of Great Britain and Ireland) Jersey	The fishing smack was run down and sunk off Cape Barfleur, Manche, France by Vauban (France).

== 22 May ==
List of shipwrecks: 22 May 1869
Ship	State	Description
Dharwar	(United Kingdom of Great Britain and Ireland) Straits Settlements	The ship was destroyed by fire at Galle, Ceylon.
Genius	Bremen	The ship was driven ashore at English Point, Canada. She was on a voyage from Bremen to Montreal, Quebec, Canada.
Hudson	United States	The ship departed from Akyab, Buram for Falmouth, Cornwall, united Kingdom. No further trace, presumed foundered with the loss of all hands.
Lidskjalfolsen	Flag unknown	The ship was driven ashore at Cape Rosier, Canada. She was on a voyage from Havre de Grâce, Seine-Inférieure, France to Quebec City, Canada.

== 23 May ==
List of shipwrecks: 23 May 1869
Ship	State	Description
Collingwood	New Zealand	The barque ran aground at Timaru, South Island during a gale.
Fordmill	United Kingdom	The brig was abandoned in the Atlantic Ocean with the loss of a crew member. Survivors were rescued by the schooner Queen (United Kingdom). Fordmill was on a voyage from Swansea, Glamorgan to Halifax, Nova Scotia, Canada.
Hirondelle	United Kingdom	The ship ran aground in the Clyde. She was on a voyage from Greenock, Renfrewshire to Hong Kong. She was refloated and taken in to Gareloch.
S. M.	United Kingdom	The steam lighter ran aground and sank at Torryburn, Fife. She was on a voyage from Grangemouth, Stirlingshire to Torryburn.

== 24 May ==
List of shipwrecks: 24 May 1869
Ship	State	Description
Karen Marie	Denmark	The koff ran aground at Nymindegab. She was on a voyage from Hartlepool, County Durham, United Kingdom to Nymindegab.
Susan Jane	New Zealand	The barque ran aground at Timaru, South Island during a gale.

== 25 May ==
List of shipwrecks: 25 May 1869
Ship	State	Description
Dolphin	(United Kingdom of Great Britain and Ireland) Guernsey	The schooner was run into by the steamship Tasso (United Kingdom) and sank off the Owers Sandbank, in the English Channel off the coast of Sussex. Her crew were rescued by Tasso. Dolphin was on a voyage from Saint Vincent to London.
Figlia Maggiore	Trieste	The ship was run into and sunk by the steamship Russia (United Kingdom) off Bedloes Island, New York City, United States. Her crew survived.
Flora	France	The schooner was driven ashore east of Charlestown, Cornwall, United Kingdom.
Freedom	United Kingdom	The ship was driven ashore near Ballygally, County Antrim. She was on a voyage from Belfast to Red Bay, County Antrim.
Helen	United Kingdom	The ship departed from Cochin, India for London. No further trace, presumed foundered with the loss of all hands.
Mayflower	United Kingdom	The yacht broke from her moorings, drove ashore and sank at Montrose, Forfarshire.

== 26 May ==
List of shipwrecks: 26 May 1869
Ship	State	Description
Acorn	United Kingdom	The ketch collided with the steamship South of Ireland (United Kingdom) and sank off St. Anns Head, Pembrokeshire. Her crew were rescued by South of Ireland.
Isabella Saunders	United Kingdom	The ship foundered in the Atlantic Ocean. Her crew were rescued by Constance (United Kingdom). Isabella Saunders was on a voyage from Cardiff, Glamorgan to New York, United States.
Mary Jane	United Kingdom	The steamship struck a rock and sank near Ardrishaig, Argyllshire. All on board were rescued. She was on a voyage from Greenock, Renfrewshire to Ardrishaig.

== 27 May ==
List of shipwrecks: 27 May 1869
Ship	State	Description
Branch	United Kingdom	The schooner was abandoned off Les Hanois, Guernsey, Channel Islands. Her crew were rescued by Hannah (United Kingdom). Branch was taken in to Falmouth, Cornwall in a derelict condition on 5 June by Terpsichore (United Kingdom).
Condor	Prussia	The brigantine ran aground at Arbroath, Forfarshire, United Kingdom. She was on a voyage from Memel to Arbroath. She was refloated.
Gloriana	United Kingdom	The ship ran aground at Fisherrow, Lothian. She was on a voyage from Riga, Russia to Fisherrow. She was refloated the next day.
Henry Harvey	United Kingdom	The brigantine ran aground on the Shingles, in the Thames Estuary. She was on a voyage from London to Hayle, Cornwall.
Hugh and Ann	United Kingdom	The ship ran aground on the Shingles. She was on a voyage from London to Waterford.
Ocean	United Kingdom	The schooner ran aground at Arbroath. She was refloated.
Ostern	Flag unknown	The brig foundered in the North Sea 125 nautical miles (232 km) off Boddam, Aberdeenshire with the loss of all hands.

== 28 May ==
List of shipwrecks: 28 May 1869
Ship	State	Description
Auguste	Norway	The ship was driven ashore in a capsized condition at Bacton, Norfolk, United Kingdom. She was on a voyage from Larvik to Montrose, Forfarshire, United Kingdom.
Maria Catharina	Denmark	The smack ran aground at Buckie, Banffshire, United Kingdom. She was on a voyage from Christiania, Norway to Buckie. She was refloated the next day and placed under repair.
Robert	Prussia	The schooner capsized and sank in the North Sea 50 nautical miles (93 km) east of Great Yarmouth, Norfolk, United Kingdom. Her crew survived. She was on a voyage from Brussels, West Flanders, Belgium to Copenhagen, Denmark.
Sarah Jane	United Kingdom	The cutter ran aground at Howth, County Dublin. Her crew survived. She was on a voyage from Bangor and Arklow, County Wicklow.
Stephen and Elizabeth	United Kingdom	The brig foundered 11 nautical miles (20 km) north east of Trevose Head, Cornwall. Her crew were rescued. She was on a voyage from Llanelly, Glamorgan to Port-en-Bessin, Calvados, France.

== 29 May ==
List of shipwrecks: 29 May 1869
Ship	State	Description
Alberta	United Kingdom	The ship was damaged by fire in St. Bride's Bay. She was on a voyage from Huelva, Spain to Liverpool, Lancashire.
Lady Aberdour	United Kingdom	The brig ran aground off Kennetpans, Clackmannanshire. She was on a voyage from Alloa, Clackmannanshire to Genoa, Italy. She was refloated and taken in to Leith, Lothian.
Lithuania	Prussia	The brig was driven ashore at Slite, Gotland, Sweden. She was on a voyage from Grimsby, Lincolnshire, United Kingdom to Kronstadt, Russia.
Superb	Prussia	The schooner was wrecked on the Jadder. Her crew were rescued. She was on a voyage from Newcastle upon Tyne, Northumberland, United Kingdom to Tønsberg.

== 30 May ==
List of shipwrecks: 30 May 1869
Ship	State	Description
Constantine	Spain	The ship was abandoned in the North Sea off the coast of Nord, France. She was on a voyage from Helsinki, Grand Duchy of Finland to Cádiz.
Eliza and Jane	United Kingdom	The ship was driven ashore at Point Lucena, Brazil. She was on a voyage from London to Pernambuco, Brazil. She was condemned, refloated and taken in to Paraíba, Brazil.

== 31 May ==
List of shipwrecks: 31 May 1869
Ship	State	Description
Ann Livington	United Kingdom	The ship foundered 30 nautical miles (56 km) off Bilbao, Spain. Her crew were rescued by the schooner Aigle (France). Ann Livington was on a voyage from Bilbao to Cardiff, Glamorgan.
Boreas	Norway	The barque ran aground and sank on the Longsand, in the North Sea off the coast of Essex, United Kingdom. Her crew were rescued by the schooner Era (Norway). Boreas was on a voyage from Newcastle upon Tyne, Northumberland, United Kingdom to Naples, Italy.
Catharina Geerdina	Netherlands	The ship foundered in the Atlantic Ocean off the coast of Portugal. Her crew survived. She was on a voyage from St. Ubes, Portugal to Rotterdam, South Holland.
John and Mary	United Kingdom	The smack was driven ashore at Burry Port, Glamorgan. She was on a voyage from Londonderry to Bridgwater, Somerset.
St. Leonards	United Kingdom	The ship was driven ashore at Wells-next-the-Sea, Norfolk. She was on a voyage from Dendermonde, East Flanders, Belgium to Wells-next-the-Sea.

== Unknown date ==
List of shipwrecks: Unknown date in May 1869
Ship	State	Description
Antes	United States	The ship was driven ashore and severely damaged near Yarmouth, Nova Scotia, Canada. She was on a voyage from Baltimore, Maryland to Halifax, Nova Scotia.
Arthur Crosbie	United Kingdom	The ship was wrecked on the Prato Shoals, in the South China Sea. She was on a voyage from Hong Kong to Tientsin, China.
Auguste	France	The ship foundered of San Sebastián, Spain. Her crew were rescued. She was on a voyage from Marseille, Bouches-du-Rhône to Swansea, Glamorgan, United Kingdom.
Banryū	Republic of Ezo	Boshin War (Naval Battle of Hakodate Bay): The schooner was beached by her crew at Hakodate Bay, Japan and set on fire after running out of ammunition. The wreck was later salvaged and used in civil service.
Buccleugh	United Kingdom	The ship was run down in the Gulf of Finland by the steamship Norfolk (United Kingdom). Her crew were rescued. Buccleugh was on a voyage from Burntisland, Fife to Kronstadt, Russia.
Catherine and Anne	United Kingdom	The ship was driven ashore and wrecked near Bahia, Brazil.
Clemence	France	The ship was wrecked near Bathurst, Gambia Colony and Protectorate. All on board survived.
Delphin	Prussia	The ship was abandoned off Cádiz, Spain.
Glaurus	Norway	The ship was discovered derelict in the Atlantic Ocean by Shannon (United Kingdom). She put eight crew on board; they took Glaurus in to Saint Helena. She had been on a voyage from Norway to Australia.
Grange	United Kingdom	The steamship collided with the steamship Levant (United Kingdom) at Gibraltar and was beached.
Honor	United Kingdom	The ship was driven ashore at Domesnes, Russia. She was on a voyage from Stettin to Riga, Russia.
Jeanne	France	The schooner was abandoned at sea before 14 May. Her crew were rescued.
Juanita	Hamburg	The ship was wrecked on the coast of Aracan, Burma. She was on a voyage from Akyab, Burma to Falmouth, Cornwall, United Kingdom.
Lucia Jantina	Flag unknown	The ship sank near Saint Petersburg, Russia. She was on a voyage from Newcastle upon Tyne, Northumberland, United Kingdom to Saint Petersburg.
Marquis of Abercorn	United Kingdom	The paddle steamer was run into by the paddle steamer Lord Gough (United Kingdom) and sank 8 nautical miles (15 km) off Portpatrick, Wigtownshire. All on board were rescued. Marquis of Abercorn was on a voyage from Dublin to Glasgow, Renfrewshire.
Martha	Norway	The brigantine was wrecked at Guadeloupe.
Matoaka	(United Kingdom of Great Britain and Ireland) United Kingdom	The full-rigged ship disappeared in the Indian Ocean along with all 77 onboard (45 passengers and 32 crew) after departing Lyttelton, New Zealand on 13 May.
Penguin	United States	The ship was abandoned at sea. She was on a voyage from Cuba to New York.
Preene	Rostock	The ship collided with the steamship Princess Alexandra (United Kingdom) and sank. She was on a voyage from Rostock to Copenhagen, Denmark.
Pride of the West	United Kingdom	The ship was wrecked at Norte Point. She was on a voyage from Haiti to Cardiff, Glamorgan.
Redite	Netherlands	The ship was abandoned in the Bay of Biscay before 17 May. She was on a voyage from Swansea to Cádiz.
Rotterdam	Flag unknown	The steamship was driven ashore at Kalana, Russia. She was on a voyage from Stettin to Saint Petersburg, Russia.
Senhorinha	Portugal	The ship was lost whilst on a voyage from Lisbon to Paysandú, Uruguay.
Seraphina Tatham	United Kingdom	The ship was wrecked near Barbados. She was on a voyage from London to Barbados.
Spray	United Kingdom	The ship was wrecked at "North Torbay", Newfoundland Colony with the loss of all hands. She was on a voyage from Gibraltar to Saint John's, Newfoundland Colony.
Stag	United Kingdom	The ship ran aground at Bombay, India and was severely damaged. She was on a voyage from Mauritius to Bombay. She was condemned.
St. Bede	United Kingdom	The steamship was driven ashore at Brăila, Ottoman Empire. She was on a voyage from Brăila to Marseille, Bouches-du-Rhône, France. She was refloated.
'St. George	United Kingdom	The steamship was wrecked on the Blonde Rock, off Seal Island, Nova Scotia. She was on a voyage from Portland, Maine to Glasgow, Renfrewshire.
Theodor Korner	Grand Duchy of Mecklenburg-Schwerin	The brig foundered off the north coast of Kent, United Kingdom before 17 May.
Thomas and Mary	United Kingdom	The brig foundered in the North Sea. She was on a voyage from Sunderland to the Nieuw Diep.
Two Ellens	United Kingdom	The ship was wrecked near Shelburne, Nova Scotia. She was on a voyage from Middlesbrough, Yorkshire to Saint Andrews, New Brunswick, Canada.
William Wheatley	United Kingdom	The ship was wrecked off the coast of Cuba.
Zeta	United Kingdom	The steamship struck a rock and was beached in Tongey Bay. She was later refloated and taken in to Valparaíso, Chile for repairs.
