= Japanese warship Mikaho =

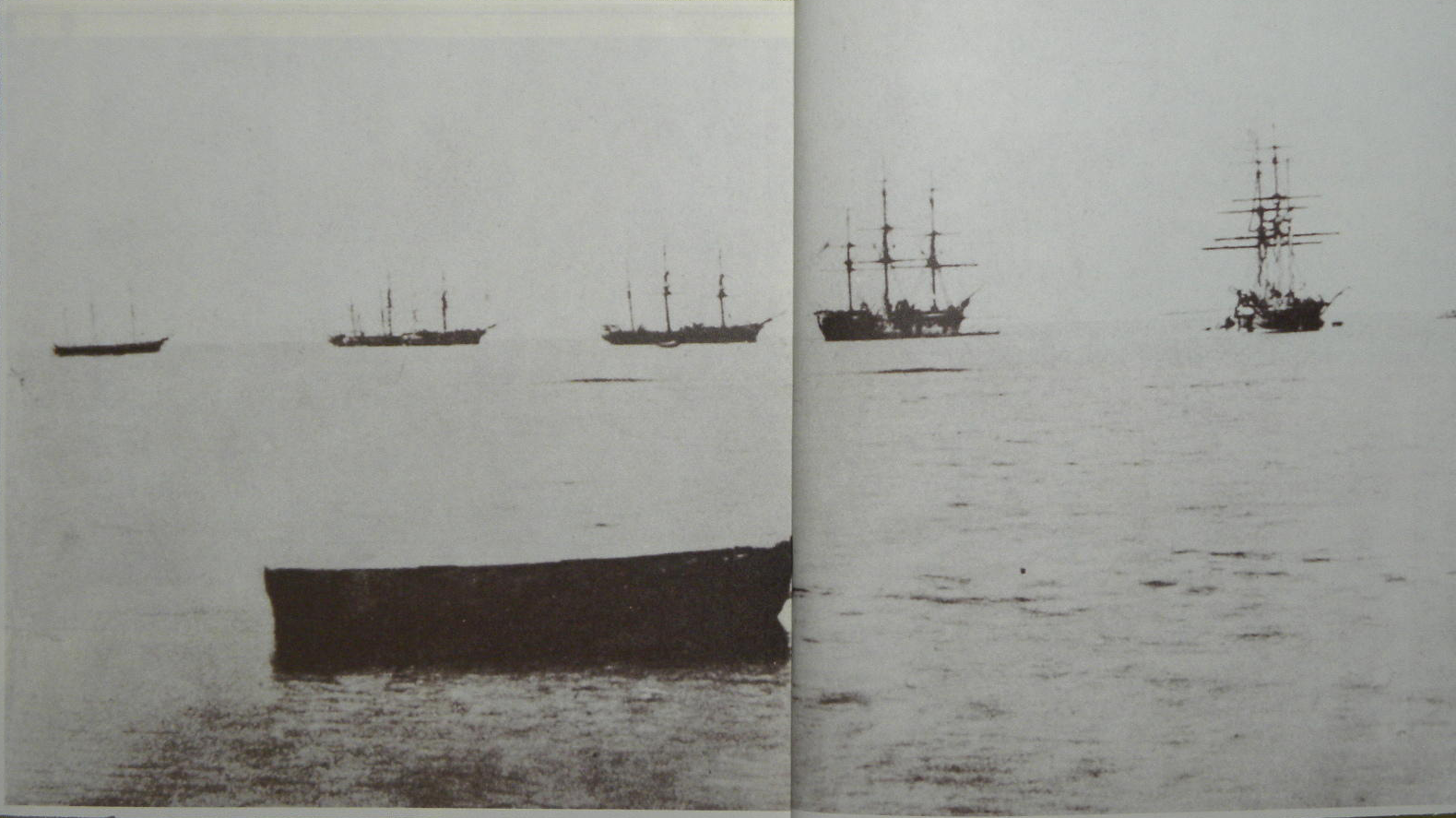
Part of the fleet of Enomoto Takeaki off Shinagawa. From right to left: Kaiten, Kaiyō, Kanrin, Chōgei, Mikaho. The Banryō and Chiyodagata are absent. 1868 photograph.

Mikaho (美嘉保) was a Japanese small steam transportation warship belonging to the Navy of the Bakufu around 1860.

== History ==
In 1868 Vice Admiral Enomoto Takeaki, vice-commander of the Navy, refused to remit his fleet to the new government. He left Shinagawa on August 20, 1868, with the four steam warships (Kaiyō, Kaiten, Banryū, Chiyodagata) and four steam transports (Kanrin, Mikaho, Shinsoku, Chōgei). The ship had 2,000 members of the Navy, 36 members of the "Yugekitai" (reaction force) headed by Iba Hachiro, several officials of the former Bakufu government such as the vice-commander in chief of the Army Matsudaira Taro, Nakajima Saburosuke, and members of the French Military Mission to Japan, headed by Jules Brunet.

On August 21, the fleet encountered a typhoon off Choshi, in which the Mikaho was lost and the Kanrin, heavily damaged, forced to rally the coast, where she was captured in Shimizu.

One of her captains was Tadaemon Aoki.
