= Panlong (mythology) =

Aquatic dragon in Chinese mythology

Panlong (simplified Chinese: 蟠龙; traditional Chinese: 蟠龍; pinyin: pánlóng; Wade–Giles: p'an-lung; lit. "coiled dragon") is an aquatic dragon resembling a jiaolong 蛟龍 "river dragon; crocodile" in Chinese mythology, an ancient motif in Chinese art, and a proper name.

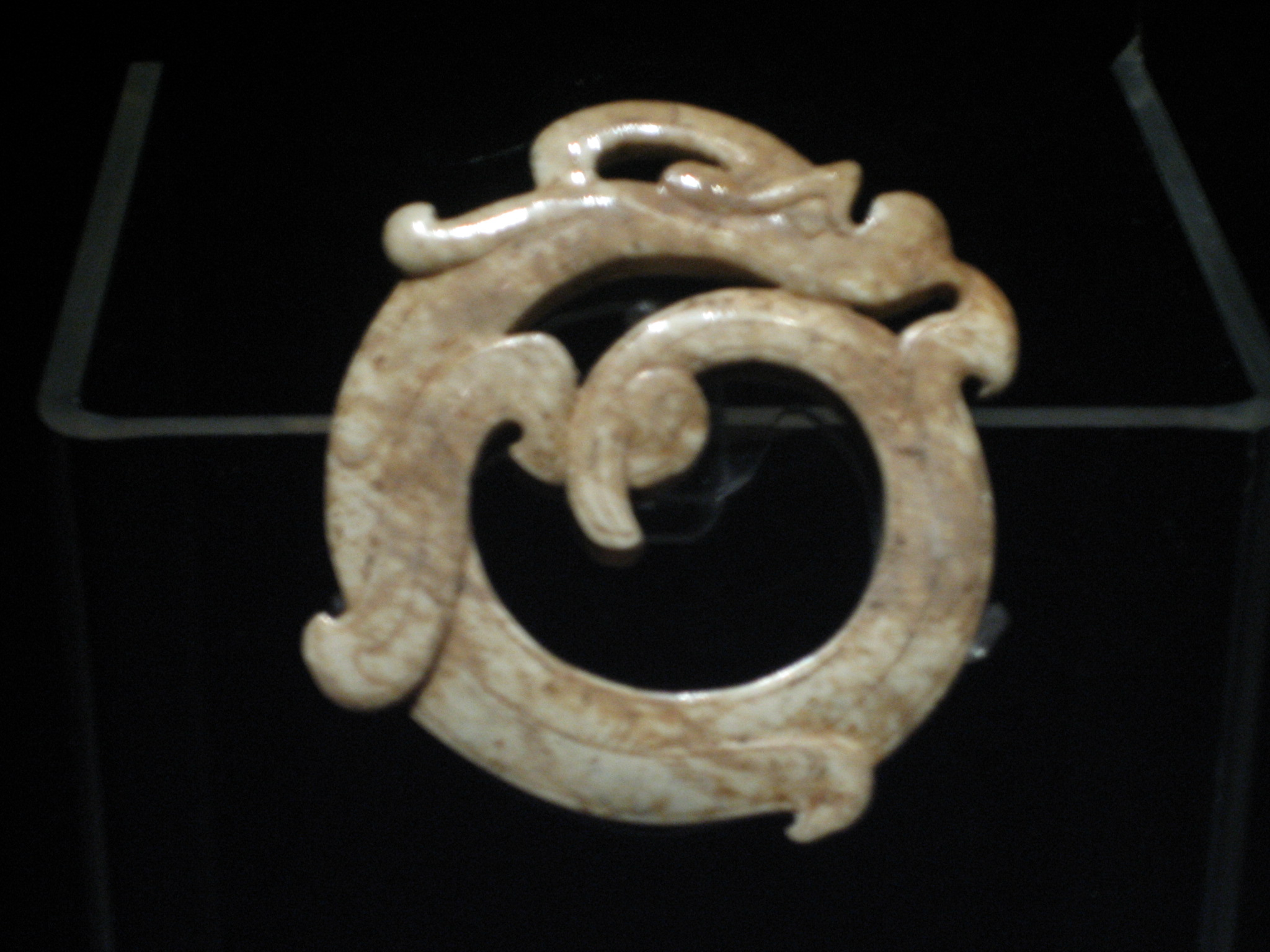
Jin dynasty jade ring with coiled-dragon design

Qing dynasty flag with a coiled dragon

== Word ==
The Chinese compound panlong combines pan 蟠 "coiling; curling; curving; bending; winding; twisting" and long 龍 or 龙 "dragon". Longpan 龍蟠 "dragon coiling", the reverse of panlong, is a literary metaphor for "person of unrecognized talent" (see the Fayan below).

Panlong "coiled dragon" can be written 蟠龍 or 盤龍, using pan 蟠's homophonous variant Chinese character pan 盤 or 盘 "tray; plate; dish". Another example of this graphic interchangeability is panrao 蟠繞 or 盤繞 "twine round; surround; fill". Two Classical Chinese panlong 盤龍 idioms are panlongpi 盤龍癖 ("coiling dragon habit") "gambling addiction" (alluding to 5th-century gambler Liu Yi 劉毅 or Liu Panlong 劉盤龍 of Eastern Jin ) and panlong-wohu 盤龍臥虎 (lit. "coiling dragon crouching tiger") "talented people remaining concealed". In Fengshui and Four Symbols theory, the Dragon and Tiger are symbolic opposites. Take for instance, longtan-huxue 龍潭虎穴 ("dragon's pond and tiger's cave") "dangerous places" or Wohu canglong 臥虎藏龍 Crouching Tiger, Hidden Dragon.

== Textual usages ==
Coiled Dragon

Chinese classic texts began using panlong in the Han dynasty (206 BCE – 220 CE). The (2nd century BCE) Huainanzi first records panlong as a decorative style on Chinese bronzes.

Great bells and tripods, beautiful vessels, works of art are manufactured. The decorations cast on these have been superb. The mountain dragon, or pheasant, and all animals of variegated plumage, the aquatic grass, flamboyants and grains of cereals were engraven on them, one symbol interwoven with another. The sleeping rhinoceros and crouching tiger, the dragon, wreathed in coils, were wrought.

The later term panlongwen 蟠龍文 "coiled-dragon pattern/design (on bronzes, pillars, etc.)" compares with panchiwen 蟠螭紋 (see chilong 螭龍) and panqiuwen 蟠虯紋 (see qiulong 虯龍). Another Huainanzi context lists longshepan 龍蛇蟠 (lit. "dragon snake coiling") "serpentine passage" as a good ambush location.

An exiguous pass, a ferry pontoon, a great mountain, a serpentine defile, a cul-de-sac, a dangerous pitfall, a narrow ravine, full of winding ways like the intestines of a sheep, a hole like a fisher's net, which admits, but from which there is no exit, are situations in which one man can hold back a thousand.

The materialist philosopher Yang Xiong (53 BCE – 18 CE) used both panlong and longpan. His Fangyan 方言 "Regional Speech" dictionary defined panlong 蟠龍 "coiled/curled dragon", "Dragons which do not yet ascend to heaven [cf. tianlong "heavenly dragon"] are called p'an-lung." His Fayan 法言 "Words to Live By" anthology coined the metaphor longpan 龍蟠 (lit. "dragon coiling") "person of unrecognized talent", "'a dragon coiled in the mud will be insulted by a newt,' meaning 'a sage will be ridiculed by a fool'."

The (2nd century CE) Shangshu dazhuan 尚書大傳 commentary to the Classic of History parallels panlong and jiaoyu 鮫魚 (or jiaolong 蛟龍), "the 蟠龍 'coiled dragon' was greatly trusted in its lair, the 鮫魚 ' dragon; crocodile' leaped in its pool."

The (12th century CE) Song dynasty Biji manzhi 碧雞漫志 "Random Jottings from the Green Rooster Quarter" by Wang Zhuo 王灼 describes using panlong dragons in sympathetic magic for rainfall, "where a mirror, adorned on the backside with a "coiled dragon", p'an lung, 盤龍, is said to have been worshipped (rather used in a magical way) in order to cause rain."

== Proper names ==
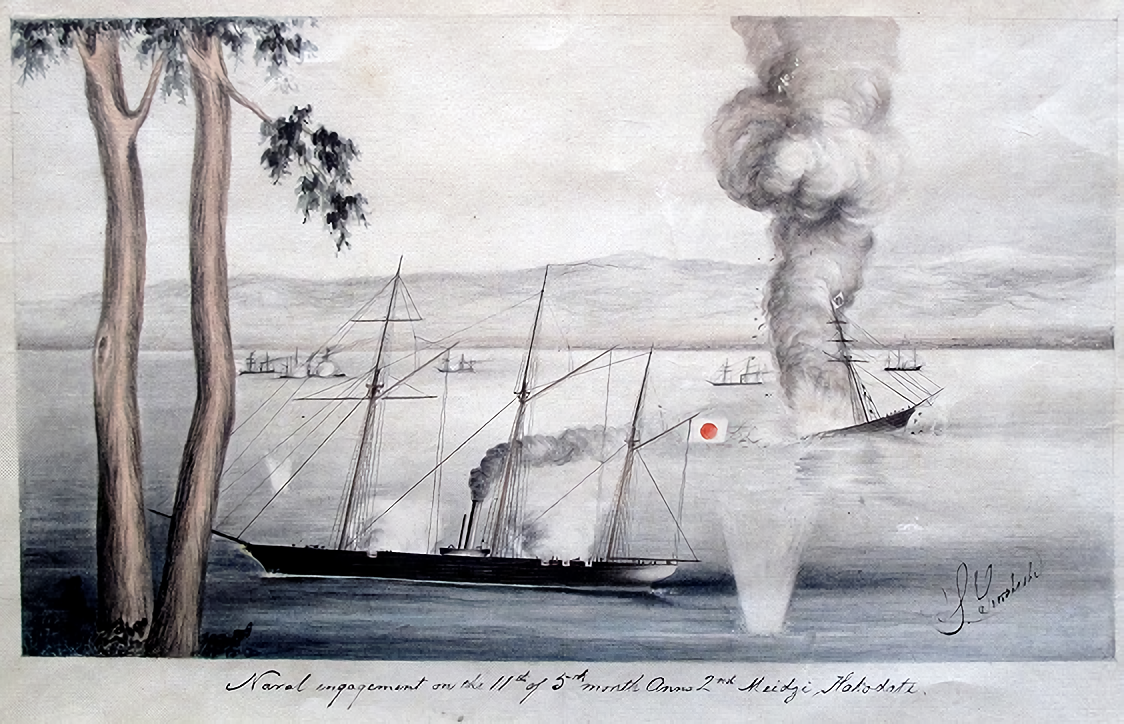
1868 painting of the Banryū sinking the Chōyō.

In addition to the ancient decorative style mentioned above, Panlong 蟠龍 or 盤龍 "Coiled Dragon" is used in several names.

- Panlong 蟠龍 or 盘龙, pen name of Huan Xuan
- Panlongmu 盤龍目 or 盘龙目, Pelycosaur (from Greek "bowl lizard")
- Panlongqu 盤龍区 or 盘龙区, Panlong District in Kunming Prefecture, Yunnan
- Panlongjiang 盤龍江 or 盘龙江, Panlong River in Kunming City, Yunnan
- Panlongxia 盤龍峡 or 盘龙峡, Panlong Gorge (with a famous waterfall) in Zhaoqing, Guangdong
- Panlongcheng 盤龍城 or 盘龙城, Panlongcheng archeological site of Erligang culture in Hubei
- Panlongzhen 蟠龙镇 a township on the Panlong table hill (蟠龙山) in Shaanxi.

The Japanese language borrowed banryū 蟠龍 or 蟠竜 "coiled dragon" as a loanword from Chinese panlong. Banryu names a Taikyoku shogi chess-piece and a Bakufu schooner warship Banryū.
