= Nakamuta Kuranosuke =

Imperial Japanese Navy vice admiral (1837–1916)

Viscount Nakamuta Kuranosuke
- 中牟田 倉之助
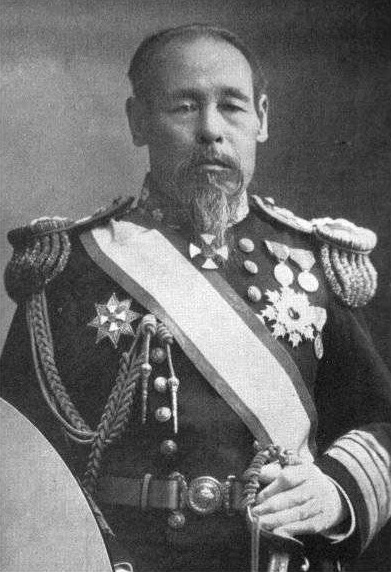
- Born: 30 March 1837; Saga, Hizen, Japan
- Died: 30 March 1916 (aged 79); Tokyo, Japan
- Military career
- Allegiance: Empire of Japan
- Branch: Imperial Japanese Navy
- Service years: 1869–1905
- Rank: Vice admiral
- Conflicts: Boshin War
- Awards: Order of the Rising Sun

Viscount Nakamuta Kuranosuke (中牟田 倉之助; 30 March 1837 – 30 March 1916) was a vice admiral in the early Imperial Japanese Navy.

== Biography ==
Nakamuta was born in Saga domain (present day Saga prefecture). He was a samurai-sailor in the domainal navy, which later became the core of the fledgling Imperial Japanese Navy. During the Boshin War to overthrow the Tokugawa bakufu, Nakamuta was captain of the frigate Chōyō at the Naval Battle of Hakodate. The Chōyō exploded after being hit by the rebel ship Banryū, but Nakamuta survived.

After the establishment of the Meiji government and the official creation of the Imperial Japanese Navy, Nakamuta was given the rank of commander (14 December 1870) and became deputy commandant of the Imperial Japanese Naval Academy. He was promoted to captain in 1871 and rear admiral the same year. He also became commandant of the Naval Academy in 1871. He was promoted to vice admiral in 1878.

Subsequently, Nakamuta was commander in chief of the Tokai Naval District (1880–1886), Yokosuka Naval District (1886–1889) and Kure Naval District (1889–1892). He was appointed Chief of the Imperial Japanese Navy General Staff in 1892, and was concurrently commandant of the Naval Staff College.

On 7 July 1884, Natamura was ennobled with the title of viscount (shishaku) under the kazoku peerage system. He was appointed a member of the Privy Council (Japan) in 1894, where he was outspoken in his opposition against the First Sino-Japanese War.

Nakamuta was forced out of active duty and into the reserves in 1900 by his political rivals Yamamoto Gonnohyōe and Kabayama Sukenori, and officially retired in 1905. He died in 1916. His grave is at Aoyama Cemetery in Tokyo.

Military offices
Preceded by Nagayoshi Maki	Commander-in-chief of Kure Naval District; 8 March 1889 - 12 December 1892	Succeeded by Arichi Shinanojō
Preceded by Inoue Yoshika	Chief of the Imperial Japanese Navy General Staff; 12 December 1892 – 18 July 1894	Succeeded by Kabayama Sukenori
