= Schleinitz =

Schleinitz may refer to:

Places

- Leuben-Schleinitz, a municipality in the district of Meißen, Saxony
- Schleinitz Range, a mountain range in north-central part of New Ireland, Papua New Guinea

People

- Alexander (Gustav Adolf) von Schleinitz (1807–1885), Prussian statesman, minister of the royal household
- Siegmund Freiherr von Schleinitz (1890–1968)
