= Japanese warship Mōshun =

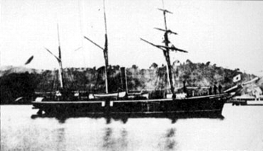
- Japanese warship Moshun

History
- Name: Moshun
- Builder: London, England
- Laid down: 1867
- Launched: 1867
- Acquired: February 1868
- Commissioned: July 1871
- Decommissioned: October 8, 1887
- Fate: Scrapped 1896

General characteristics
- Displacement: 357 long tons (363 t)
- Length: 44.5 m (146 ft 0 in)
- Beam: 6.6 m (21 ft 8 in)
- Draught: 2.5 m (8 ft 2 in)
- Propulsion: Coal-fired steam engine, 191 ihp (142 kW)
- Speed: 12 knots (14 mph; 22 km/h)
- Complement: 87
- Armament: 4 guns: 2 × 70-pounders; 2 × 6-pounders

Moshun Maru (孟春丸; Vernal Equinox) was a three-masted composite-hulled sailing ship of the Bakumatsu and early Meiji periods, with an auxiliary steam engine. She was built in 1867 on the River Thames, serving with the navy of Saga Domain, and later with the fledgling Imperial Japanese Navy.

== Service under Saga Domain ==
Moshun Maru was built in London, England originally as the gunboat Eugenie in 1867. She was purchased by Saga Domain and handed over at Nagasaki in February 1868 where she was renamed Moshun Maru. Initially assigned to be an armed cargo vessel, she transported supplies and troops from Nagasaki to Osaka, and later the Edo in support of the Satchō Alliance in the Boshin War of the Meiji Restoration. In March 1869, she was assigned to the expedition against the last remnants of the pro-Tokugawa shogunate forces in Hokkaidō, where they had formed the Republic of Ezo. While at Miyako Bay, the expedition suffered a surprise attack by the Tokugawa naval ship Kaiten. The encounter has been named the Naval Battle of Miyako Bay. She later participated in the Naval Battle of Hakodate Bay in May 1869, until the surrender of the last forces of the Republic of Ezo. However, in 1869 she also was grounded off the coast of Iwate, having been hit by a tsunami, but was later refloated.

== Service under the Imperial Japanese Navy ==
Moshun Maru was transferred on June 3, 1868 from Saga Domain to the Meiji government and assigned to the newly formed Imperial Japanese Navy, and was renamed Moshun on July 9. She was one of the ships assigned to the Taiwan Expedition of 1874. During the Ganghwa Island incident of 1875, she assisted Kasuga in the blockade the port of Busan. In 1877, she participated in the suppression of the Satsuma Rebellion.

From 1879-1882, she was used primarily as a survey ship. From 1882, Moshun was assigned to patrols of the coast of Korea, as part of a show of strength by the Japanese government in response to the burning of the Japanese embassy in Seoul during the Imo Incident. She was demobilized and transferred from the Imperial Japanese Navy to the Ministry of Communications on October 8, 1887 to serve as a training vessel for commercial sailors. She was scrapped in July 1897.

== Bibliography ==
- Jane, Frederick Thomas. The Imperial Japanese Navy. Nabu Press (2010 POD reprint of 1923 edition) ISBN 1-142-91693-6
- Lengerer, Hans (September 2020). "The 1882 Coup d'État in Korea and the Second Expansion of the Imperial Japanese Navy: A Contribution to the Pre-History of the Chinese-Japanese War 1894–95". Warship International. LVII (3): 185–196. ISSN 0043-0374.
- Lengerer, Hans (December 2020). "The 1884 Coup d'État in Korea — Revision and Acceleration of the Expansion of the IJN: A Contribution to the Pre-History of the Chinese-Japanese War 1894–95". Warship International. LVII (4): 289–302. ISSN 0043-0374.
