= Georg von Schleinitz =

Prussian explorer, naval officer, colonial administrator and hydrographer

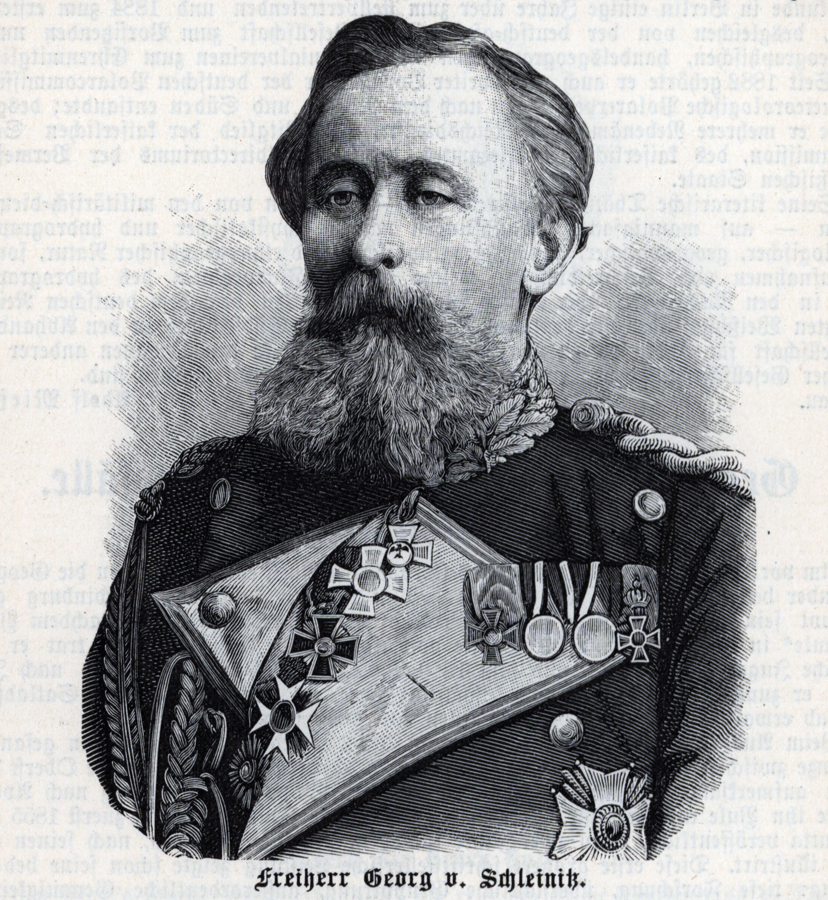

1st Landeshauptmann of German New Guinea
- In office 10 June 1886 – 1 March 1888
- Monarch: Wilhelm I
- Chancellor: Otto von Bismarck
- State Secretary for the Colonies: Herbert von Bismarck
- Preceded by: Gustav von Oertzen
- Succeeded by: Reinhold Kraetke

Personal details
- Born: 17 June 1834 Bromberg, Kingdom of Prussia
- Died: 12 December 1910 (aged 66) Hohenborn, Prussia, German Empire

Military service
- Allegiance: Kingdom of Prussia (1849‍–‍1871); German Empire (1871‍–‍1888)
- Branch: Prussian Navy; Imperial German Navy
- Service years: 1849–1888
- Rank: Vice Admiral
- Battles/wars: Battle of Tres Forcas; Austro-Prussian War; Franco-Prussian War

Georg von Schleinitz (17 June 1834 – 12 December 1910) was a Prussian explorer, naval officer, colonial administrator, and hydrographer who served as the colonial governor of German New Guinea from 1886 to 1888. He is the namesake of the Schleinitz Range of Papua New Guinea.

== Biography ==
Georg von Schleinitz was born on 17 June 1834, in Bromberg, Posen to Johann Eduard Christoph von Schleinitz (1798–1869) and Jeanette von Hippel (1804–1850). He began his maritime career as a cabin boy on a trading brig before enlisting into the Prussian Navy in 1849. He served aboard the steamship Danzig, partaking in the Battle of Tres Forcas against the Barbary pirates in August 1856. He then served aboard the frigate Arcona for its 1860–62 voyage to East Asia. He later commanded Arcona from September 1869 to May 1871, and again briefly from June to September 1873.

In 1874, Schleinitz was made commander of the frigate Gazelle, and embarked on an astronomical voyage to the Kerguelen Islands to study the Transit of Venus. He then traveled to the Pacific, naming the Gazelle Peninsula of New Guinea after his ship.

After returning to Germany in 1876, he was assigned to the board for the navy's Hydrography Office of the German Imperial Admiralty, a position he held from May 1876 to February 1886. During this period, on 30 March 1883, he was promoted to the rank of konteradmiral (rear admiral).

In 1880, Schleinitz was appointed head of the Imperial German Navy's Hydrographical Office. He became Landeshauptmann of the German New Guinea colony on 10 June 1886. During his tenure as governor, Schleinitz employed many colonial subjects as laborers to work in the colony's developing cotton and coconut industries. In addition, he established several towns and established a colonial shipping service. He also embarked on several expeditions into New Guinea, including one up the Sepik River in 1887. The flowering plant genus Schleinitzia was named in his honor by German-Jewish botanist Otto Warburg in 1891, as was the Schleinitz Range on the island of New Ireland.

Schleinitz's term as governor of New Guinea ended on 1 March 1888, and shortly thereafter retired from naval service on account of poor health. He returned to Germany, continuing to publish papers in scientific journals. He died in Hohenborn on 12 December 1910.
