= Japanese ship Kasuga =

Two naval vessels of Japan have been named Kasuga:

- Japanese warship Kasuga, also called Kasuga Maru, a Japanese wooden paddle steamer warship of the Bakumatsu and early Meiji period
- Japanese cruiser Kasuga, an armored cruiser of the Imperial Japanese Navy during the Russo-Japanese War

== See also ==
- Kasuga-class cruiser, armored cruisers of the Imperial Japanese Navy, in commission 1904–1945
- Japanese aircraft carrier Taiyō, also called Japanese Pacific Ocean liner Kasuga Maru, a Taiyō-class escort carrier of the Imperial Japanese Navy during World War II
