= Naval Battle of Hakodate =

Part of the Boshin War in 1869

- Part of the Boshin War
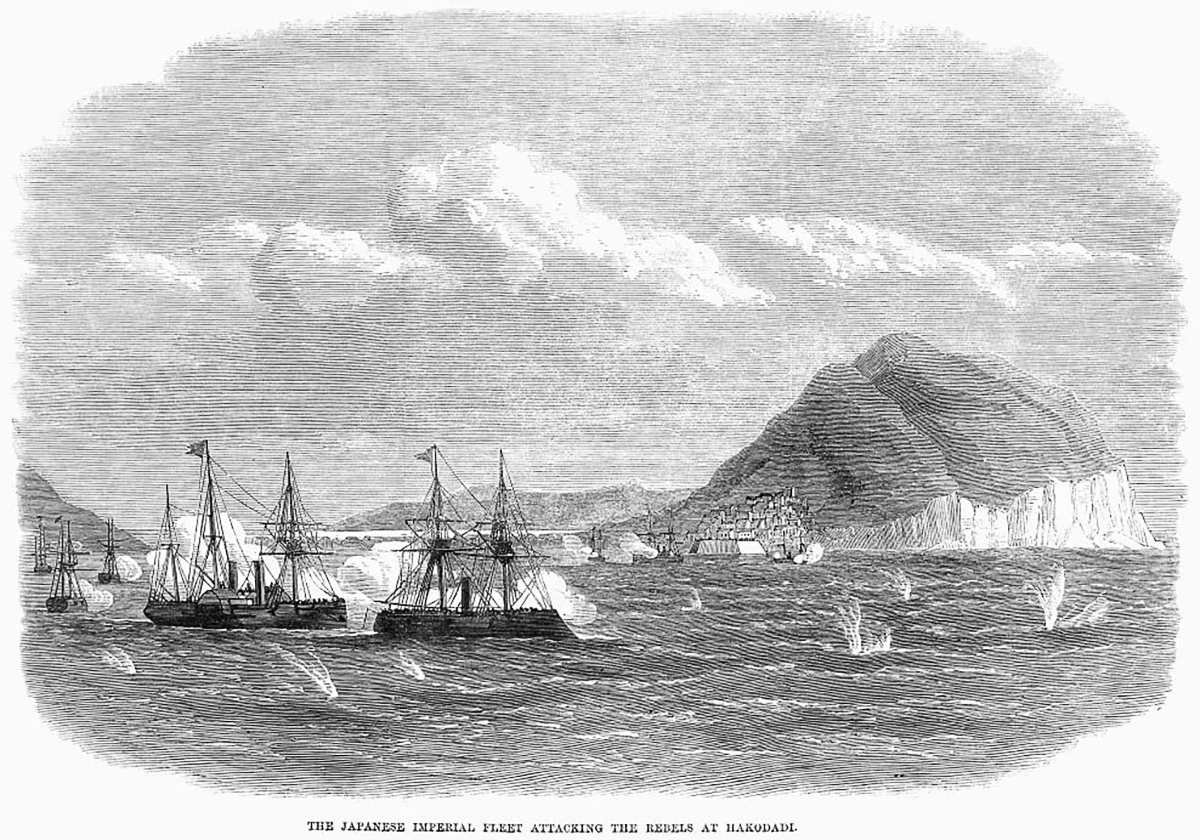
- Battle of Hakodate, William Henry Webster
Date	4 May – 10 May 1869
Location	Off Hakodate, Sea of Japan
Result	Imperial victory

Belligerents
Japan	Ezo Republic

Commanders and leaders
Masuda Toranosuke	Arai Ikunosuke; Bankichi Matsuoka

Strength
8 steam warships	5 steam warships

Casualties and losses
1 steam warship sunk	2 steam warships sunk 3 steam warships captured

The Naval Battle of Hakodate (函館湾海戦, Hakodatewan Kaisen) was fought from 4 to 10 May 1869, between the remnants of the Tokugawa shogunate navy, consolidated into the armed forces of the rebel Ezo Republic, and the newly formed Imperial Japanese Navy. It was one of the last stages of the Battle of Hakodate during the Boshin War, and occurred near Hakodate in the northern Japanese island of Hokkaido.

== Ezo Republic forces ==
The naval forces of the Ezo Republic were grouped around the warship Kaiten. The fleet originally consisted of eight steamships: Kaiten, Banryū, Japanese gunboat Chiyoda, Chōgei, Kaiyō Maru, Kanrin Maru, Mikaho and Shinsoku.

However, Kaiyō Maru and Shinsoku had been lost in a previous engagement in front of Esashi, and Kanrin Maru had been captured by Imperial forces after suffering damage in bad weather. The loss of these three major units seriously weakened the Ezo Republic side.

== Imperial forces ==
For the operation, an Imperial Japanese Navy fleet had been rapidly constituted around the recently acquired ironclad warship Kōtetsu (the former Confederacy CSS Stonewall), which had been purchased from the United States. Other Imperial ships were Kasuga, Hiryū, Teibō No.1, Yōshun, and Mōshun, which had been supplied by the domains of Saga, Chōshū and Satsuma to the newly formed Meiji government in 1868.

The nascent Imperial government started with a much weaker navy than that of the Ezo Republic, both in terms of vessel strength, unity (most of its ships were borrowed from Western domains), and training. However the loss of two major units on the Ezo side previous to the main action (Kaiyō Maru and Kanrin Maru), and, most of all, the incorporation of the revolutionary Kōtetsu since April 1868 on the Imperial side (a ship originally ordered by the Tokugawa shogunate but withheld by the United States during the main conflict under a policy of neutrality taken by foreign nation and finally delivered to the newly formed government), turned the tables. In addition, the Imperial government received the support of two transportation ships chartered by the United States for the transportation of its troops.

== Combat ==
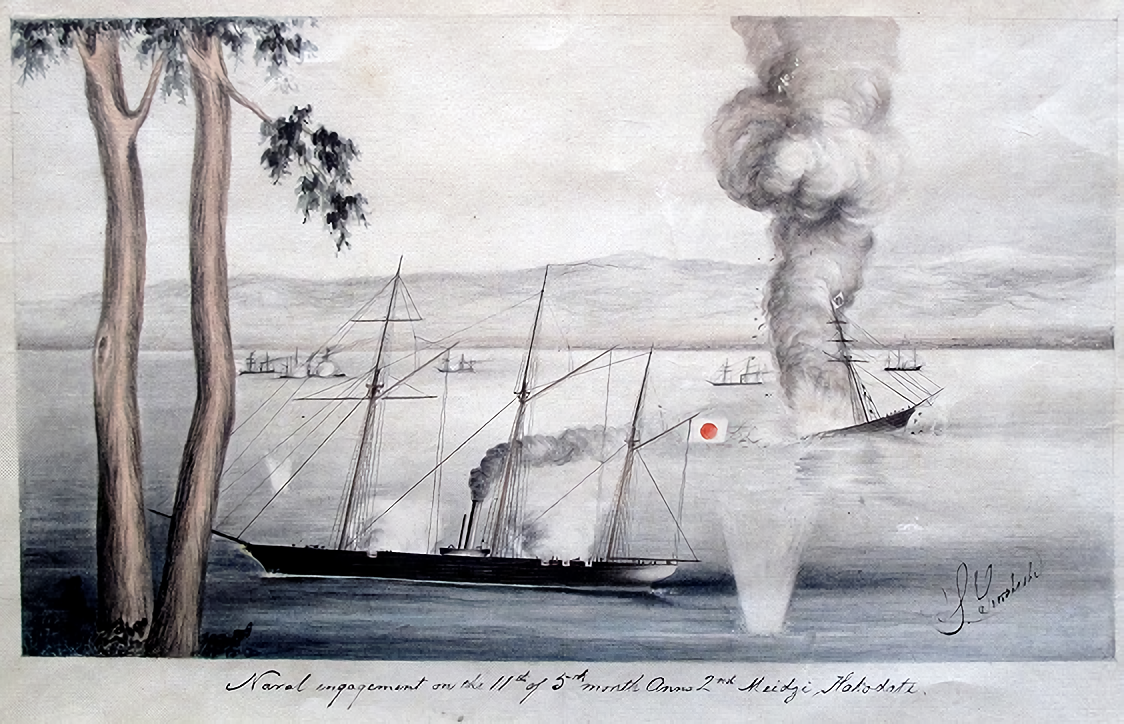
Banryū destroying the Imperial warship Chōyō in the 1869 Naval Battle of Hakodate Bay

The Imperial fleet supported the deployment of troops on the island of Hokkaido, destroyed onshore fortifications and attacked the rebel ships. On 4 May Chiyoda was captured by Imperial forces after having been abandoned in a grounding and on 7 May Kaiten was heavily hit and put out of action. Banryū managed to sink the Imperial forces' Chōyō, but Banryū later sank in turn because of heavy damage.

The Imperial Japanese Navy won the engagement, ultimately leading to the surrender of the Republic of Ezo at the end of June 1869.

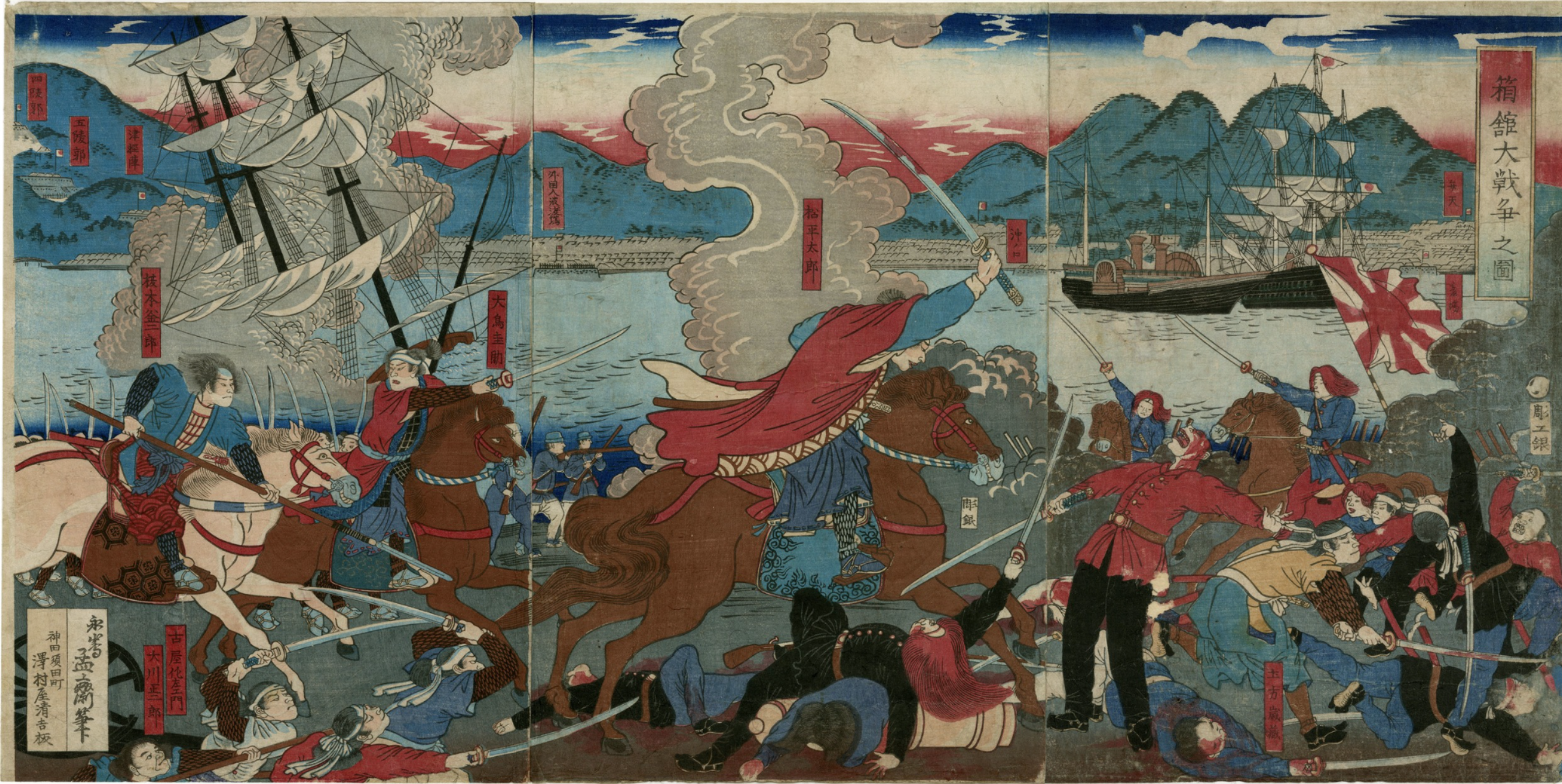
A Japanese rendition of the land and naval battle of Hakodate. Woodprint by Utagawa Yoshitora (signed as Nagashima Mosai).

Ships of foreign navies — the British HMS Pearl and the French Coetlogon — were standing by neutrally during the conflict. The French captain Jules Brunet who had trained the rebels and helped organize their defenses, surrendered on Coetlogon on 8 June.

The future Admiral of the fleet Tōgō Heihachirō participated in the battle on the Imperial side as a young third-class officer, onboard Kasuga.

== Bibliography ==
- Ballard C. B., Vice-Admiral G. A. The Influence of the Sea on the Political History of Japan. London: John Murray, 1921.
- Jentschura, Hansgeorg; Dieter Jung, Peter Mickel. Warships of the Imperial Japanese Navy, 1869–1945. United States Naval Institute, Annapolis, Maryland, 1977. ISBN 0-87021-893-X.
- Onodera Eikō, Boshin Nanboku Senso to Tohoku Seiken. Sendai: Kita no Sha, 2004.
