= Matsuoka Bankichi =

Tokugawa era Japanese naval officer (1841-1871)

Commander Matsuoka Bankichi
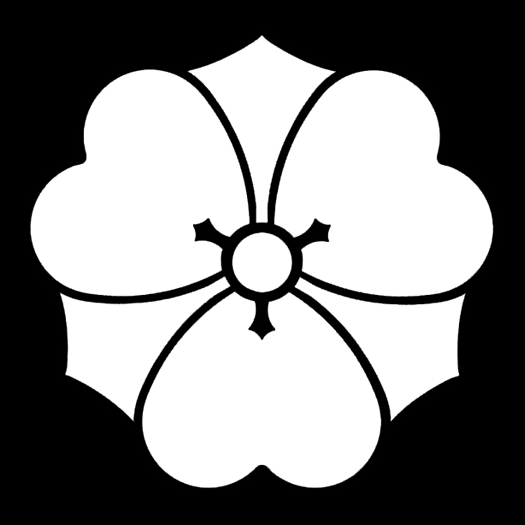
- 松岡 磐吉

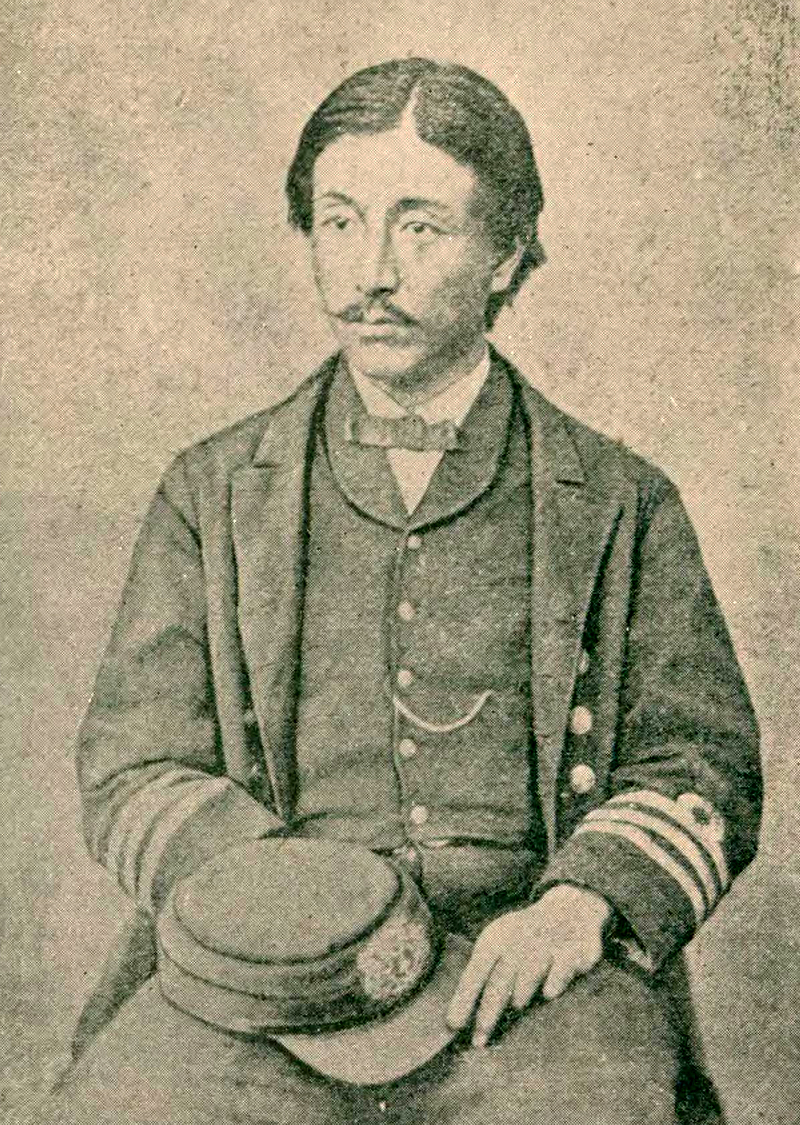

Magistrate of Esashi
- In office 1869–1869

Personal details
- Born: 1841 (Tenpō 12); Izu, Shizuoka Prefecture
- Died: July 5, 1871 (aged 29–30); Tokyo, Japan
- Parent: Matsuoka Shohei (father)

Japanese name
- Hiragana: まつおか ばんきち
- Shinjitai: 松岡 磐吉
Transcriptions
- Romanization: Matsuoka Bankichi

Matsuoka Bankichi (松岡 磐吉; 1841 – July 5, 1871) was a Japanese naval officer in the Tokugawa Navy during the Boshin War, serving as Captain of the Japanese warship Banryū during the Battle of Hakodate.

== Biography ==
Bankichi was born in Izu, the third son of Matsuoka Shohei. Shohei was a retainer for Egawa Hidetatsu of the Nirayama Daikansho. Hidetatsu was known for his interest in Western studies, especially that of modern maritime defense, and sent Bankichi to study with Dutch sailors in Nagasaki and in swordsmanship from the Shindō Munen-ryū school. Bankichi would receive an early appreciation for Western artillery and naval warfare through the advances being promulgated in the Izo region by Hidetatsu.

In 1856, Bankichi was sent to study naval art at the Nagasaki Naval Training Center where he would first meet Enomoto Takeaki. After graduating, he served as an instructor at the Gunkan Training Center in Tsukiji, participating in the first coastal survey by Japan in 1859. In 1860, Matsuoka traveled as part of Japan's first diplomatic mission to the United States as a navigator aboard the Kanrin Maru along with experienced blue water sailor John Manjiro and future Meiji reformer Yukichi Fukuzawa. After returning to Japan, Bankichi was sent to survey the Ogasawara Islands, which had been claimed by the British, and was in charge of creating survey maps for Hahajima.

The deaths of Tokugawa Iemochi and Emperor Kōmei in 1866 and 1867 brought the long simmering tension between the shogunate and the imperial court to a head, sparking the Boshin War. Bankichi would take command of the Japanese warship Banryū as forces loyal to Tokugawa Navy Admiral Enomoto Takeaki refused to surrender to the Meiji government, and escaped following the fall of the shogunate, sailing to the northern island of Ezo (now known as Hokkaido). The Bakufu loyalists would establish the Republic of Ezo, electing Enomoto as president, and appointing Bankichi magistrate of Esashi.

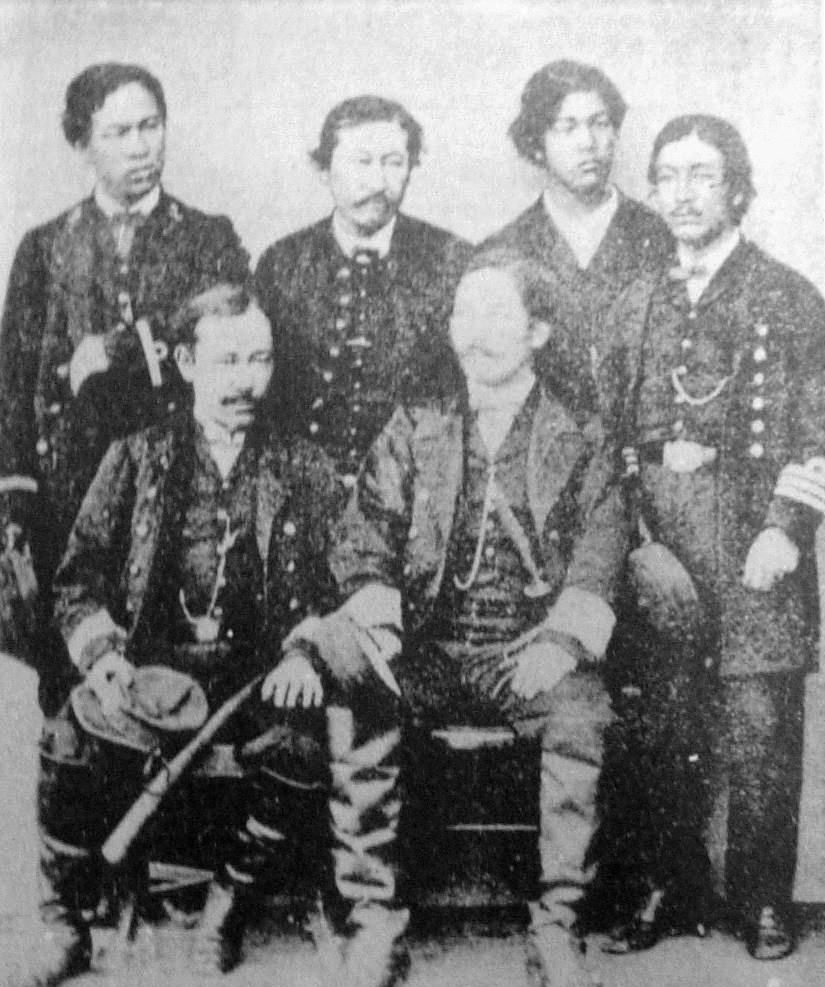
Matsuoka Bankichi (right) with Enomoto (seated right) and members of Ezo leadership

Imperial troops soon consolidated their hold on mainland Japan, and dispatched troops to Hokkaido in April 1869. As Ezo troops fortified their defenses in anticipation, Bankichi would provide cover to Enomoto's forces as they seized Matsumae Castle. During the Battle of Miyako Bay in March 1869, Bankichi was unable enter the harbor due to a storm and was forced to retreat to Hachinohe, where the fleet was to rendezvous. Upon learning the fate of the fleet, he attempted to return to Hakodate and was pursued by the Imperial ironclad Kōtetsu. Believing that he could not escape due to the difference in engine power, he prepared to fight with a boarding attack, saying, "I washed my face, changed into a new shirt, and joked, today is a good day to die." Luckily for Bankichi, the wind would shift, giving the Banryu's greater sail area an advantage over the Kōtetsu, and they would manage to escape to Hakodate

When the Naval Battle of Hakodate commenced on May 11, 1869, Bankichi drove vertically and horizontally as the last ship in the line. Despite the overwhelming difference in power, his crew hit the powder store of the Imperial warship Chōyō Maru, a sister ship to the Kanrin Maru, sinking her. This was the first recorded modern warship being sunk in ship to ship combat in Japanese history. Bankichi would continue to fight valiantly against the Imperial fleet until his ammunition was exhausted, land near Benten Daiba, breaking through the enemy line, and joined the shogunate forces there. At Benten Daiba, Benkichi and his crew continued fighting until they ran out of ammunition, food, and water, surrendering to the Imperial forces on May 15.

Bankichi would be imprisoned at the Tatsunokuchi Tadasu Interrogation Office in Tokyo with Ezo Republic President Takeaki Enomoto and other Bakufu loyalists, who surrendered on May 18. It was reported Bankichi studied English while in prison, but died on July 5, 1871. He would later be buried at the Matsuoka Family Bodaiji at the Yanaka Cemetery in Ueno.

In January 1872, he was posthumously exonerated along with the pardon of Takeaki Enomoto and other shogunate leaders.

== Legacy ==
Bankichi is portrayed in the 1988 Mitsumasa Saito limited series, Star Fort (五稜郭), by Jinya Sato, and in the 2022 Takashi Koizumi film, The Pass: Last Days of the Samurai (峠 最後のサムライ), by Kento Nagayama.
