= Battle of Awa =

1868 naval battle of the Boshin War

- Part of the Boshin War
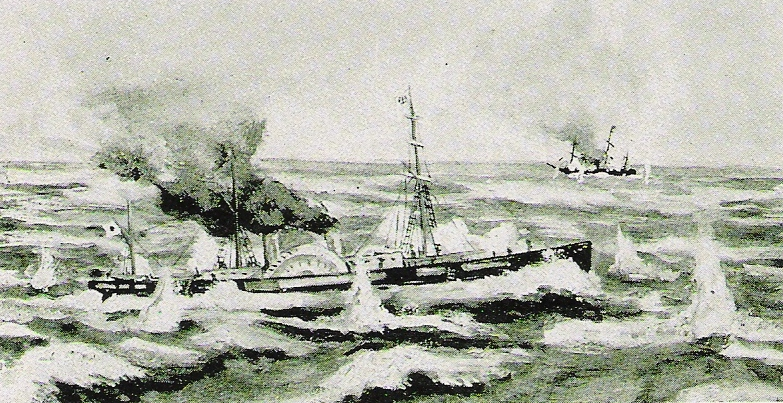
- Encounter between the Kasuga of the Satsuma navy (forefront), and the Kaiyō of the Shogunal navy (background), during the Naval Battle of Awa.
Date	28 January 1868
Location	Awa Bay, Japan
Result	Shogunate victory

Belligerents
Imperial court Satsuma	Tokugawa shogunate

Commanders and leaders
Akatsuka Genroku	Enomoto Takeaki

Strength
1 warship; 2 transports	3 warships

Casualties and losses
1 transport destroyed	Unknown

The Battle of Awa (阿波沖海戦, Awa oki kaisen) occurred on 28 January 1868 during the Boshin War in Japan, in the area of Awa Bay near Osaka. Involving ships of the Tokugawa shogunate and Satsuma vessels loyal to the imperial court in Kyoto, the battle was the second naval battle in Japanese history between modern naval forces (after the 1863 Battle of Shimonoseki Straits). Enomoto Takeaki led the shogunal navy to victory at Awa, in one of the few Tokugawa successes of the Boshin War, one day after the start of the land Battle of Toba–Fushimi (which the shogunate lost to the Imperial forces).

== Summary ==
The Satsuma Domain was preparing to return its troops to Kagoshima aboard two transports, the Shōō (翔凰) and the Heiun (平運), protected by the Satsuma warship Kasuga stationed in Hyōgo harbour. The shogunal navy under Enomoto Takeaki was nearby with the steam frigate Kaiyō Maru as its main unit, and had been supporting the Battle of Toba–Fushimi from the sea. Enomoto's fleet moved to blockade the withdrawal of the Satsuma ships.

On 28 January, in the early morning, the Satsuma ships left Hyōgo harbor. Heiun left through the Strait of Akashi, and Kasuga went south with Shōō towards the Kitan Strait. Kaiyō Maru pursued and prepared for combat. At a distance of 1,200–2,500 meters, Kaiyō Maru fired about 25 times on the two Satsuma ships, and Kasuga responded with 18 shots, without significant damage to either side. However, as more Shogunate navy ships had arrived (the Banryū and Shokaku), Kasuga broke off the engagement, and, being faster than Kaiyō Maru, escaped to Kagoshima. Unable to flee, Shōō was run aground at Yukinoura (由岐浦) and was destroyed by her crew. Looking at the burning Shōō, Enomoto expressed admiration at the fight put on by his enemies: "Although they are enemies, how remarkable" (敵ながらあっぱれ, Teki nagara appare).

The future Imperial Japanese Navy Fleet Admiral Tōgō Heihachirō was a gunner aboard Kasuga during the engagement.
