= Japanese warship Teibō =

Teibo or Teibō (丁卯) may refer to:

- Japanese gunboat Teibō No.1, a warship of the Imperial Japanese Navy, former Chōshū Domain Navy.
- Japanese gunboat Teibō No.2, a warship of the Imperial Japanese Navy, former Chōshū Domain Navy.
