= Japanese corvette Kasuga =

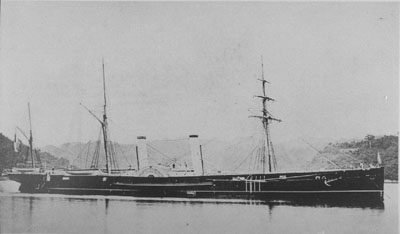
- Japanese warship Kasuga

History

Lay-Osborn Flotilla
- Name: Keangsoo (江蘇); Chen Wu (鎮吳)
- Namesake: Jiangsu province
- Builder: J. Samuel White
- Laid down: 1862
- Launched: 5 March 1863
- In service: 1863–1864
- Fate: Sold to Charles Stuart Forbes, 1865; Sold to the Satsuma Domain, 3 November 1867

Satsuma Domain
- Name: Kasuga
- Acquired: 3 November 1867
- Decommissioned: 2 February 1894
- Fate: Scrapped 1902

General characteristics
- Type: Dispatch vessel
- Displacement: 1,289 long tons (1,310 t)
- Tons burthen: 1000 bm
- Length: 241.5 feet (73.6 m)
- Beam: 29 feet (8.8 m)
- Draught: 9.25 feet (2.82 m)
- Installed power: 300 nhp; 2,279 ihp (1,699 kW)
- Propulsion: Oscillating cylinder steam engine
- Speed: 17 knots (31 km/h; 20 mph)
- Armament: 2 × 68-pounder guns; 4 × 18-pounder long guns

Kasuga Maru (春日丸, Vernal Sun) was a Japanese wooden paddle steamer warship of the Bakumatsu and early Meiji period, serving with the navy of Satsuma Domain, and later with the Imperial Japanese Navy. She was originally named Keangsoo (Chinese: 江蘇; pinyin: Jiāngsū; lit. 'Jiangsu'), and was a wooden dispatch vessel built for the Imperial Chinese Navy. She was constructed in 1862 by Whites at Cowes, she formed part of the Lay-Osborn Flotilla during the Taiping Rebellion.

== Design ==
Keangsoo was the largest of the vessels which made up the Lay-Osborn Flotilla. She was 241.5 feet (73.6 m) long overall, had a beam of 29 feet (8.8 m) and an average draft of 9.25 feet (2.82 m). She displaced 1,000 long tons (1,016 t). The propulsion system consisted of a 300-horsepower (220 kW) oscillating cylinder steam engine, built by Day & Co. of Southampton, equipped with four boilers; however during trials she was demonstrated at producing up to 2,279-horsepower (1,699 kW). Her engines produced an average cruising speed of 16.9 knots (31.3 km/h; 19.4 mph), while on two boilers she could operate at an average speed of 14.2 knots (26.3 km/h; 16.3 mph).

The main armament on the vessel were two mounted smoothbore muzzle-loading 68-pounder guns. Her secondary armament consisted of four 18-pounder long guns.

== Construction and career ==
=== Lay-Osborn Flotilla ===
Keangsoo was a wooden dispatch vessel, laid down at Whites' shipyard at Cowes on the Isle of Wight in 1862 and launched on March 5, 1863. Whites had become well known for winning contracts with the Ottoman Navy during the 1850s. She was the flagship of the Lay-Osborn Flotilla, the name given to a grouping of vessels which had been arranged to be sent to China by Horatio Nelson Lay, then the Inspector General of Customs for Imperial China, to help suppress the ongoing Taiping Rebellion. Prince Gong of the Qing Dynasty gave permission for Lay to proceed with this task, and provided the funds to procure the ships. While some, such as HMS Africa (subsequently renamed China) were purchased from the Royal Navy, Keangsoo was one of three dispatch vessels alongside Tientsin and Kwangtung which were procured as new builds. Permission was given by the British Government to enlist British sailors for the Chinese flotilla, and Captain Sherard Osborn was co-opted to command the fleet, with the ship under the direct command of Charles Stuart Forbes.

Keangsoo underwent trials in May 1863 while underway to China. There was a problem in the command structure for the fleet, since the Chinese Government expected to receive the vessels directly under their own command, and had already assigned new commanding officers and names for the ships. However, Lay and Osborn agreed that Osborn would only accept orders from Lay, and he in turn would only pass orders on from the Chinese Government if he agreed with them on an individual basis. The ships reached Shanghai in September, where it was renamed Chen Wu (Chinese: 鎮吳; pinyin: Zhènwú) by the Chinese government. The Chinese refused to provide stores or funds since Osborn would not accept a new Chinese commander. When the authorities attempted to bribe the enlisted men from the fleet to join them, Osborn sent it to Chefoo (now Yantai). Following the intervention of a British minister, the fleet was ordered to depart for India with Osborn taking Keangsoo, Kwangtung, Amoy and the yacht Thule to Bombay (now Mumbai). The Keangsoo was then laid up alongside the other remaining vessels of the flotilla, since their sales were embargoed until the end of the American Civil War. She was then acquired by her Captain Forbes once again, following the end of the conflict in 1865.

=== Boshin War ===
While at Nagasaki, Keangsoo was purchased by Matsukata Masayoshi, a leading Satsuma samurai, on November 3, 1867, for the amount of 160,000 ryō (approx $250,000 at then current exchange rates), whence she was renamed Kasuga Maru. With a speed of 17 knots (31 km/h), and six cannons, she was faster than anything in the Tokugawa shogunate Navy, and Matsukata intended to convert her into a warship. However, already alarmed by the high cost, as the price was four times the budget Matsukata had been authorized, he was overruled by the Shimazu clan elders. She was assigned to be used as a cargo ship. In disgust, Matsukata gave up command of the ship he had bought, only to see it converted into a warship just a few months later under the command of his assistant, Akatsuka Genroku.

Kasuga Maru entered Hyōgo harbour in January 1868, where she was blockaded by three ships of the Tokugawa Navy: Kaiyō Maru, Banryū Maru and Shōkaku Maru. Tōgō Heihachirō, future Admiral of the Fleet, joined the ship on January 3 as a third-class officer and a gunner. The night of January 3, Kasuga Maru escaped from Hyōgo harbour with two other ships. She was spotted by Kaiyō Maru, which chased her into Awa Strait. The two ships exchanged fire at a distance of 1,200-2,500 meters, without any actual hits. The exchange was named the Naval Battle of Awa and was the first naval battle in Japan between two modern fleets. Kasuga Maru returned to Kagoshima after that exchange.

In March 1869, Kasuga Maru participated in the expedition against the last remnants of the pro-Tokugawa forces in Hokkaido, where they had formed the Republic of Ezo with the support of a few French military advisors such as Jules Brunet. While at Miyako Bay, the expedition suffered a surprise attack by the Bakufu ship Kaiten. Kaiten attacked the state-of-the art ironclad ship Kōtetsu, but she was repulsed by Gatling guns on board the Kōtetsu and cannon response by Kasuga Maru. The encounter has been named the Naval Battle of Miyako Bay. After these events Kasuga Maru participated in the Naval Battle of Hakodate Bay in May 1869, until the surrender of the last forces of the Republic of Ezo.

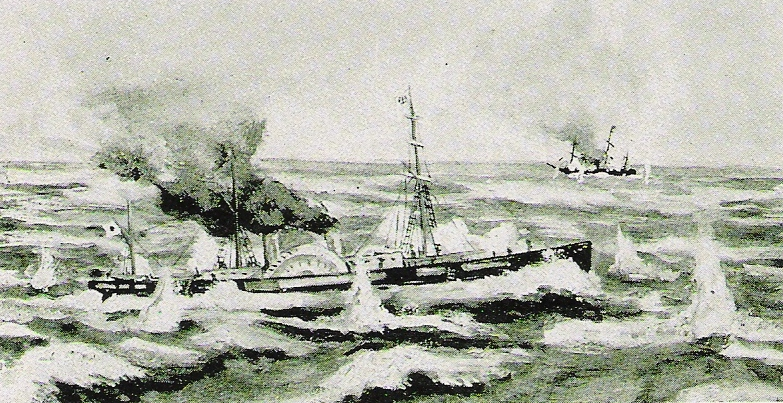
Encounter between the Kasuga Maru of the Satsuma navy (forefront), and the Kaiyo Maru of the Tokugawa Shogunate Navy (background), during the Naval Battle of Awa.

=== Imperial Japanese Navy ===
In April 1870, Kasuga Maru was transferred from the Satsuma Domain to the Meiji government and assigned to the newly formed Imperial Japanese Navy, and was renamed Kasuga at that time. In 1872, under the command of Itō Toshiyoshi, she carried Japanese envoys to Korea as part of Japan's ongoing attempts to obtain diplomatic recognition from Joseon dynasty Korea. The failure of this mission was one of the underlying factors in the subsequent Ganghwa Island incident of 1875, during which Kasuga was assigned to blockade the port of Busan. Under the command of Inoue Yoshika, Kasuga was also one of the ships which participated in the Taiwan Expedition of 1874.

Kasuga was demobilized in 1894 and then assigned to the mine-laying group at the Takeshiki Guard District on Tsushima Island. She was sold for scrap in 1902.
