= Leuben-Schleinitz =

- Ortsteil of Nossen
- Interactive map of Leuben-Schleinitz
- Location within Germany Location within Saxony
- Coordinates: 51°9′N 13°20′E
- Country: Germany
- State: Saxony
- District: Meißen
- Town: Nossen

Area
  - Total: 26.71 km^{2} (10.31 sq mi)
- Elevation: 139 m (456 ft)

Population (2012-12-31)
  - Total: 1,308
  - Density: 48.97/km^{2} (126.8/sq mi)
- Time zone: UTC+01:00 (CET)
  - Summer (DST): UTC+02:00 (CEST)
- Postal codes: 01623
- Dialling codes: 035241
- Vehicle registration: MEI, GRH, RG, RIE

Leuben-Schleinitz is a former municipality in the district of Meißen, in Saxony, Germany. Since 1 January 2014, it is part of the town Nossen.
