= Japanese frigate Kaiyō Maru =

Japanese warship, 1865–1868

Coordinates: 41.8658°N 140.1172°E

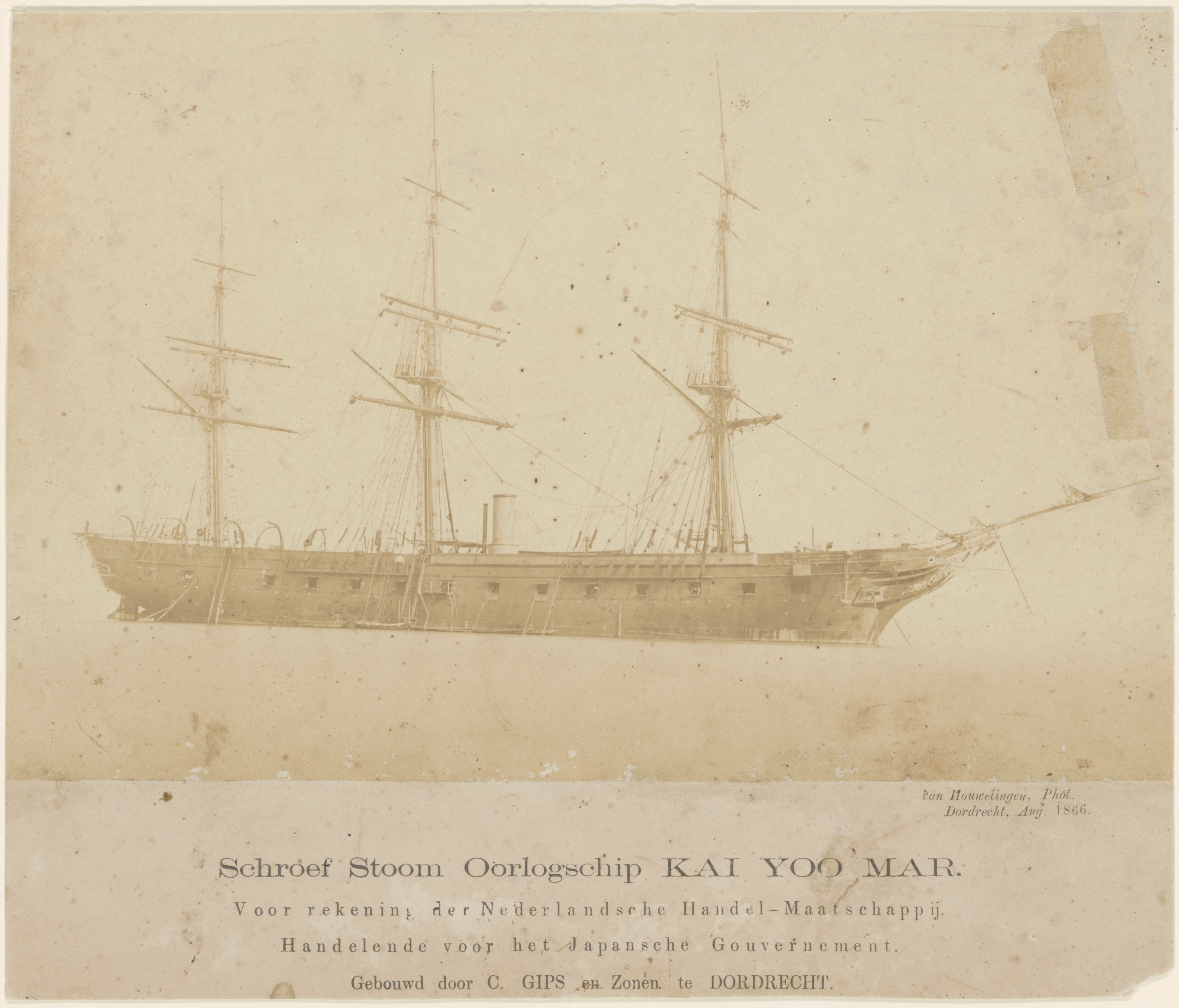
- Kaiyō Maru in 1867–1868

History

Tokugawa Shogunate
- Name: Kaiyō Maru
- Ordered: 1863
- Builder: C.Gips and Sons, Dordrecht, Netherlands
- Laid down: August 1863
- Launched: 3 November 1865
- Commissioned: 10 September 1866
- Fate: Became part of navy of Ezo Republic 1868

Ezo Republic
- Name: Kaiyō Maru
- Acquired: 1868
- Fate: Wrecked 15 November 1868

General characteristics
- Type: Frigate
- Displacement: 2,590 long tons (2,632 t)
- Length: 72.2 m (236 ft 11 in) o/a
- Beam: 13.04 m (42 ft 9 in)
- Draught: 6.4 m (21 ft 0 in)
- Propulsion: Coal-fired auxiliary steam engine, 400 hp
- Sail plan: Ship-rigged 3-masted sailboat; Sail area 20,970 m^{2} (225,700 sq ft)
- Speed: 10 knots (12 mph; 19 km/h)
- Armament: 18 × 16 cm (6 in) guns; 8 × 30-pounder guns; 5 more cannons later

Kaiyō Maru (開陽丸) was one of Japan's first modern warships, a frigate powered by both sails and steam. She was built in the Netherlands, and served in the Boshin War as part of the navy of the Tokugawa shogunate, and later as part of the navy of the Republic of Ezo. She was wrecked on 15 November 1868, off Esashi, Hokkaido, Japan.

== Construction and design ==
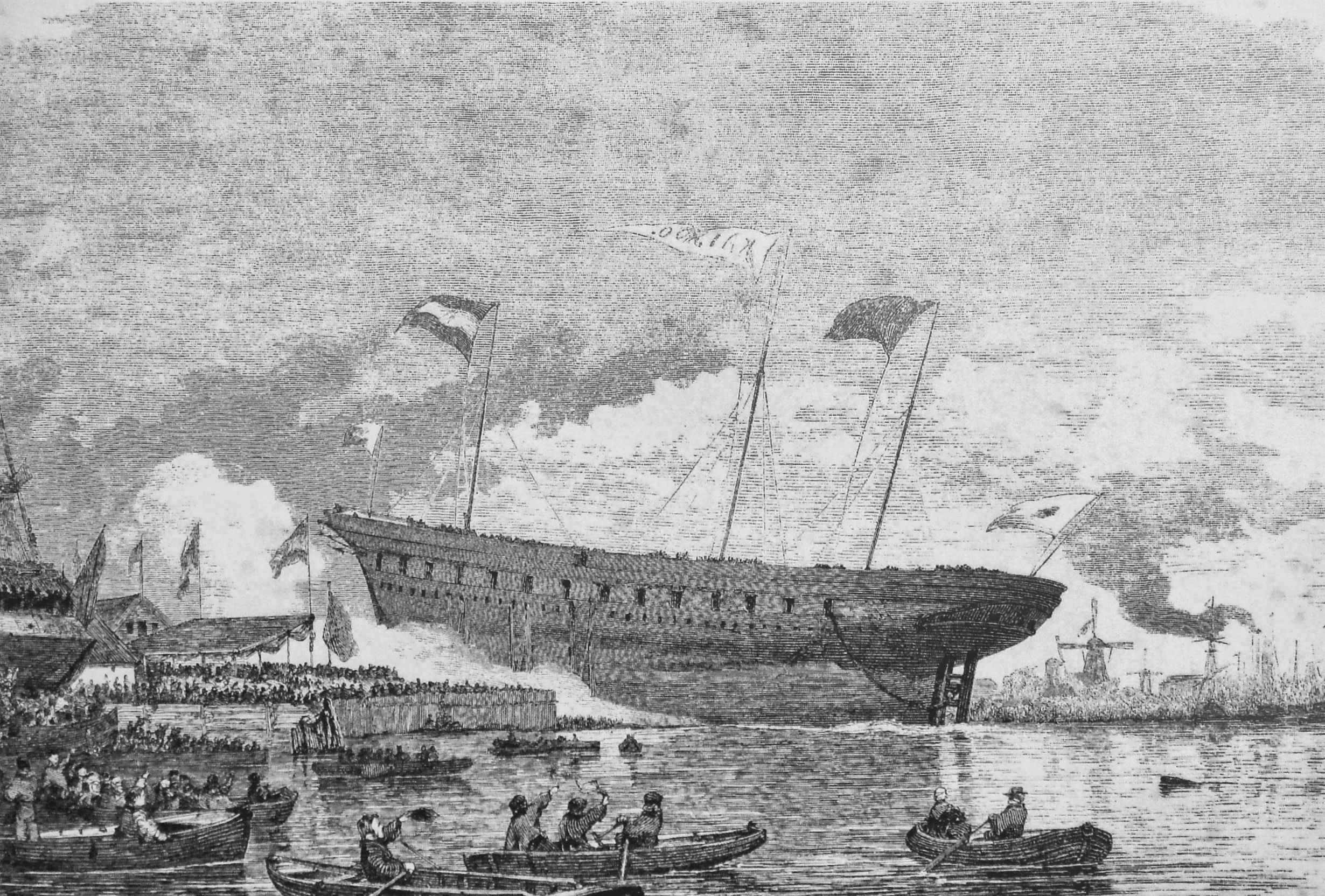
Launch of Kaiyō Maru in Dordrecht, 1865

Kaiyō Maru was ordered in 1863, and built by Cornelis Gips and Sons, at Dordrecht, Netherlands, for a sum of 831,200 guilders. Her construction was overseen by a Japanese military mission under Uchida Masao and Akamatsu Noriyoshi. She was launched in October 1866, and anchored before Vlissingen on 23 October. Kaiyō Maru arrived in Japan in November of the same year. She was the largest wooden warship ever built by a Dutch shipyard at the time. She was 240 feet (73 m) long.

== Career ==
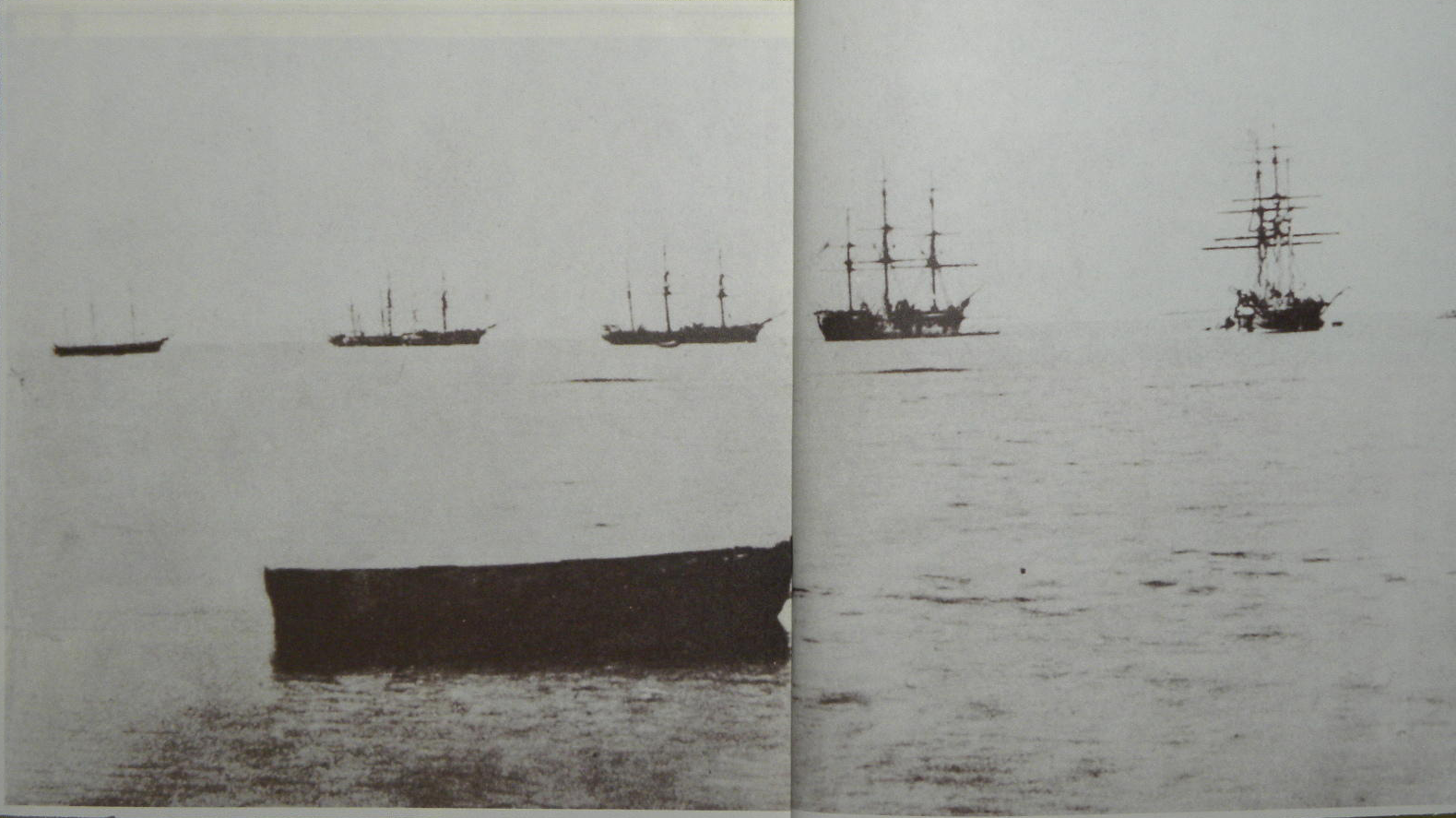
Part of the fleet of Enomoto Takeaki off Shinagawa in 1868. Kaiyō Maru is second from right.

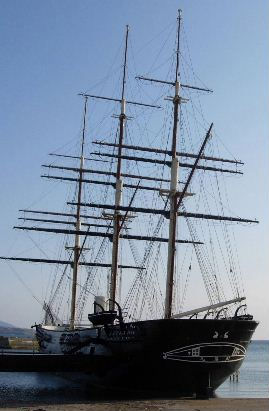
Kaiyō Maru replica in Esashi

In January 1868 Kaiyō Maru was engaged in the naval battle of Awa off Awaji Island, where she, Banryū Maru and Hazuru Maru battled against the Satsuma Navy's Kasuga Maru, Hōō Maru, and Heiun Maru. During the battle, Hōō Maru was sunk off the coast of Awa.

In late January 1868, Kaiyō Maru, Kanrin Maru, Hōō Maru, and five other modern ships fled to Hokkaido, under Admiral Enomoto Takeaki. They carried a handful of French military advisors, and their leader Jules Brunet. While in Hokkaido, they became a part of the navy of the short-lived Ezo Republic, founded by Enomoto Takeaki. Kaiyō Maru became the flagship of the navy of the Ezo Republic, but she soon was wrecked off Esashi, Hokkaido, Japan, during a storm on 15 November 1868. The steamship Shinsoku made a rescue attempt, but it too sank.

== Salvage ==
The guns and ship chandlery of Kaiyō Maru were discovered on the seafloor on 14 August 1968 by the submarine Yomiuri-Gō (読売号). Further remains were discovered but project financing prevented the salvage at that time however several items were recovered in 1969. Dives were conducted in August 1974 that confirmed a need for excavation of the extensive remains. Full scale excavation of the wreck from a depth of 15 m (49 ft) began in June 1975. The salvage of portions of the wreck located in the open sea were completed in seven years. The inland portions of the wreck were slowed by poor visibility. Costs for the salvage totaled over 3 million yen by 1985. Desalinization of the recovered artifacts began upon recovery. A replica of Kaiyō Maru was constructed in 1990. She is now on display at the docks in Esashi and has become a tourist attraction showing the salvaged remains of the original ship.
