= Japanese gunboat Teibō No.2 =

Japanese warship

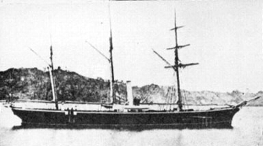
Teibō

The Japanese warship Teibō No. 2 (第二丁卯, Daini Teibō) was a ship of governmental forces during the Boshin war.

She was originally built in England and acquired by the fief of Chōshū in western Japan, before being remitted to the new Imperial government in 1868.

She rated 125 tons, had a 60 hp engine and was armed with 5 cannons.

== Bibliography ==
- Jentschura, Hansgeorg; Jung, Dieter & Mickel, Peter (1977). Warships of the Imperial Japanese Navy, 1869–1945. Annapolis, Maryland: United States Naval Institute. ISBN 978-0-87021-893-4.
- Lengerer, Hans (2020). "The Kanghwa Affair and Treaty: A Contribution to the Pre-History of the Chinese–Japanese War of 1894–1895". Warship International. LVII (2). International Naval Research Organization: 110–131. ISSN 0043-0374.
