= Japanese gunboat Chiyodagata =

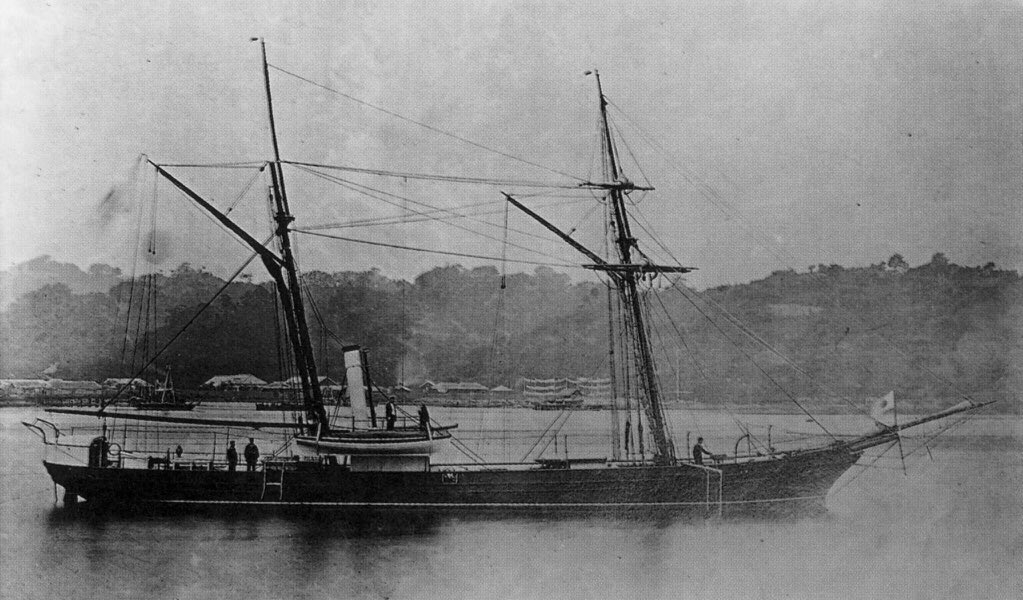
- Japanese gunboat Chiyoda

History

Japan
- Name: Chiyoda
- Builder: Ishikawajima
- Laid down: May 7, 1861
- Launched: July 2, 1863
- Acquired: Originally May 1868
- Decommissioned: January 28, 1888
- Fate: Scrapped 1911 or thereafter

General characteristics
- Displacement: 140 long tons (142 t)
- Length: 29.7 m (97 ft 5 in) p/p; 31.3 m (102 ft 8 in) w/l
- Beam: 4.8 m (15 ft 9 in)
- Draught: 2 m (6 ft 7 in)
- Propulsion: Coal-fired reciprocating steam engine, 60 hp (45 kW); 1 shaft
- Speed: 5 knots (5.8 mph; 9.3 km/h)
- Complement: 35
- Armament: 1 × 150 mm (6 in) gun; 2 × small guns

Chiyoda (千代田形, Chiyodagata (Note: Chiyodagata literally means "Chiyoda-Class". It was originally intended for the Chiyoda to be the lead ship of her class of gunboats, but in the end no sister ships were built, and subsequently the Chiyoda was officially known as Chiyodagata while in naval service. She was re-designated Chiyoda Maru upon becoming a whaling ship, as per Japanese ship-naming conventions for merchant ships.)) was a gunboat of the Tokugawa Navy, and Japan's first domestically-built steam warship (Japan's first steamship was the Unkōmaru (雲行丸) built by the fief of Satsuma in 1855). She was a 3rd class wooden gunboat and laid down May 7, 1861, and launched July 2, 1863 by the shipbuilder, and future industrial giant, Ishikawajima.

Completed in May 1866, she participated in the conflict of the Boshin War with the Bakufu loyalists, against the newly formed Imperial Army. She was captured during the Naval Battle of Hakodate Bay, and was grounded during the conflict. In May 1868 she was seized by the Japanese government, then captured by the rebels on 4 October 1868. Recaptured again by the Japanese government on 30 April 1869, she became a training ship until she was decommissioned on 28 January 1888. Afterwards she served as a whaling ship until 1911, after which time she was broken up (scrapped).

== Bibliography ==
- Jentschura, Hansgeorg; Jung, Dieter & Mickel, Peter (1977). Warships of the Imperial Japanese Navy, 1869–1945. Annapolis, Maryland: United States Naval Institute. ISBN 0-87021-893-X.
