= Schleinitz Range =

Mountain range in Papua New Guinea

- Location within Papua New Guinea

Highest point
- Peak: 1,481

Geography
- Country: Papua New Guinea
- Range coordinates: 3°S 151.5°E

The Schleinitz Range is a mountain range in north-central part of New Ireland, Papua New Guinea. Highest point of the mountains is at 1,481 m. As are other mountain ranges in Papua New Guinea it is home to many rare species of fauna and flora and is highly biodiverse and covered in thick rainforest.

This range was named after German Vice admiral Georg von Schleinitz (1834-1910).
