= Japanese warship Shinsoku =

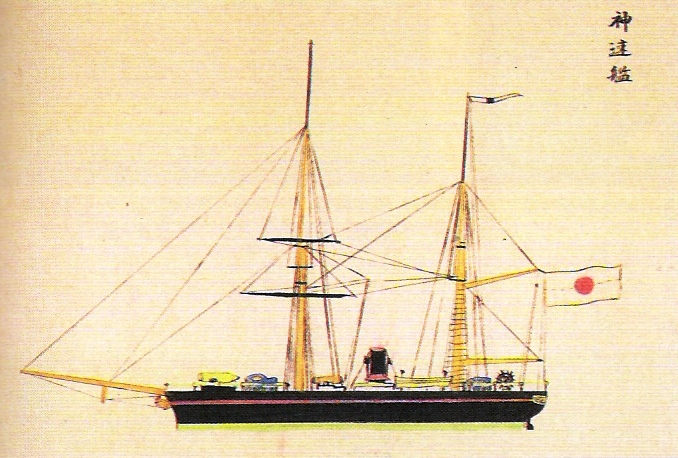
- Shinsoku

History

Tokugawa Shogunate
- Name: Shinsoku

Shinsoku (神速; Godspeed) was an early Japanese warship and steam transport that saw its main use in the Boshin War on the Shogunate side under the command of Enomoto Takeaki, vice-commander of the Shogunate Navy.

She was originally built in the United States, where she was named Meteor.

During the Battle of Hakodate, Shinsoku was deployed as part of the Shogunate force. When the frigate Kaiyō Maru sank in a tempest off the coast of Esashi, Hokkaido, Shinsoku attempted to help rescue the survivors. However, it too capsized and sank, dealing a devastating blow to the Shogunate forces.
