= Japanese warship Chōyō Maru =

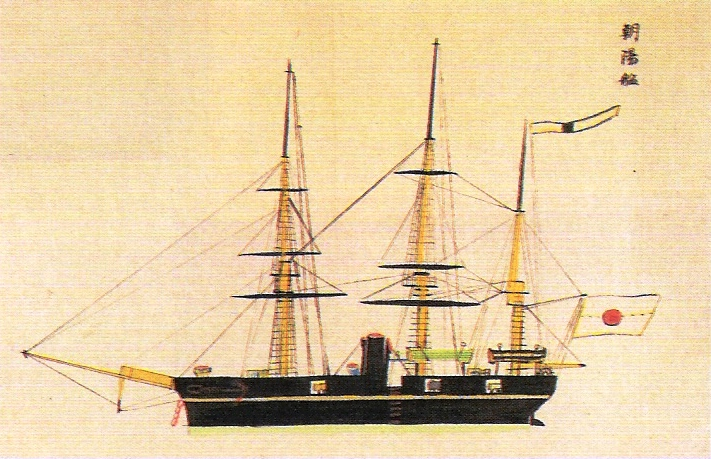
- Chōyō Maru in 1868 painting

History

Empire of Japan
- Name: Chōyō Maru
- Builder: C.Gips & Sons, Dordrecht, Netherlands
- Laid down: 1849
- Launched: 1850
- Acquired: January 15, 1850
- Stricken: May 11, 1869
- Fate: Sunk in combat

General characteristics
- Class & type: Bali-class sloop
- Type: Steam corvette
- Displacement: 600 t (591 long tons)
- Length: 49 m (160 ft 9 in) o/a
- Beam: 7.27 m (23 ft 10 in)
- Propulsion: Coal-fired steam engine, 100 hp (75 kW)
- Sail plan: 3-masted schooner rig
- Speed: 6 knots (6.9 mph; 11 km/h)
- Armament: 12 cannon

Chōyō Maru (朝陽; Morning Sunshine) was an early sail and screw-driven steam corvette. She was ordered by the Tokugawa shogunate ruling Japan during the Bakumatsu period from the Netherlands and served as a training vessel, and subsequently served with the nascent Imperial Japanese Navy during the Boshin War. She was lost in combat during the Naval Battle of Hakodate Bay.

== Background ==
Since the beginning of the seventeenth century, the Tokugawa shogunate ruling Japan pursued a policy of isolating the country from outside influences. Foreign trade was maintained only with the Dutch and the Chinese and was conducted exclusively at Nagasaki under a strict government monopoly. No foreigners were allowed to set foot in Japan, and no Japanese was permitted to travel aboard. In June 1635 a law was proclaimed prohibiting the construction of large, ocean-capable vessels. However, by the early nineteenth century, this policy of isolation was increasingly under challenge. In 1844, King William II of the Netherlands sent a letter urging Japan to end the isolation policy on its own before change would be forced from the outside.

Following the July 1853 visit of Commodore Perry, and intense debate erupted within the Japanese government on how to handle the unprecedented threat to the national’s capital, and the only universal consensus was that steps be taken immediately to bolster Japan’s coastal defenses. The law forbidding construction of large vessels was repealed, and many of the feudal domains took immediate steps to construct or purchase warships. However, the ships produced within Japan were based on reverse-engineering of designs some decades old, and the ships were already obsolete by the time of their completion. The need for steam-powered warships to match the foreign Black ships was a pressing issue, and the Tokugawa shogunate issued an order to the Dutch for two new warships for the price of 100,000 Mexican dollars each.

The first vessel was Japan, later renamed Kanrin-Maru (咸臨丸), and the second vessel was Yedo, later renamed Chōyō Maru.

== Design ==
Chōyō Maru was a three-masted wooden-hulled corvette with a schooner rig, and with an auxiliary one-cylinder coal-fired 100 horsepower (75 kW) reciprocating steam engine turning a twin screws. She had an overall length of 49 metres (160 ft 9 in) and a displacement of 600 tons. Her armament consisted of twelve muzzle-loading cannon. Her design was based on HNS Bali, and she was built at the C. Gips & Sons shipyard at Dordrecht.

== Operational history ==
=== With the Tokugawa Navy ===
Yedo arrived at Nagasaki in May 1858 and was soon renamed Chōyō Maru. She was assigned to be a training ship to the newly formed Nagasaki Naval Training Center, under Nagai Naoyuki, with Dutch adviser Lieutenant H. van Kattendijke leading a team of Dutch sailors to provide training. Also at the Nagasaki Naval Training Center were Kankō Maru and Kanrin Maru. These ships were joined a month later by Nagasaki (later called Denryu Maru), a sister ship of Chōyō Maru which had been purchased by Saga Domain.

On the closure of the Nagasaki Naval Training Center in 1859, she was transferred to the new Tsukiji Naval Training Center in Edo, with Katsu Kaishu as one of her crewmen. In 1861, she was captained by Yatabori Ko and in 1862 participated in a colonization expedition to the Ogasawara Islands to solidify Japanese claims to that archipelago. In 1863, she participated in the First Chōshū expedition, and much to the embarrassment of the shogunate, was briefly captured by Chōshū forces. In 1864, she participated in the suppression of the pro-sonnō jōi forces in the Mito Rebellion.

=== With the Imperial Japanese Navy ===
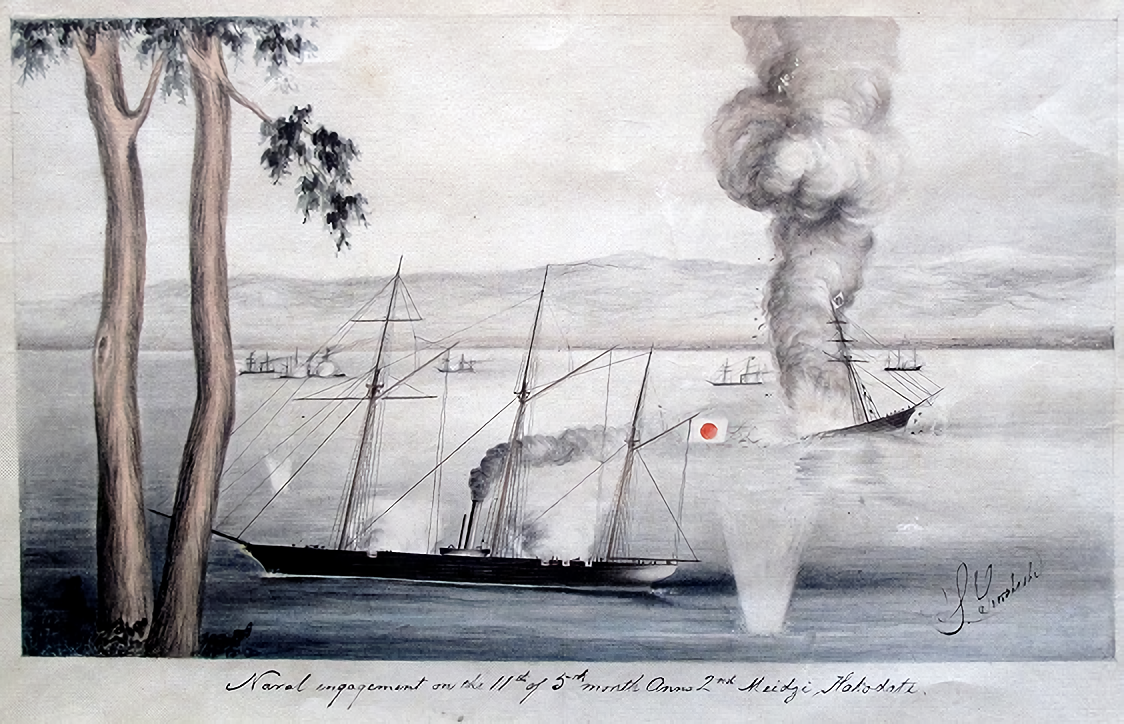
Sinking of Chōyō Maru by Banryū

Following the Meiji Restoration, Chōyō Maru was taken over by the Meiji government in 1868 and became one of the first ships of the fledgling Imperial Japanese Navy. She was captained by Nakamuta Kuranosuke of Hizen Province and a former student of the Nagasaki Naval Training Center. During the Boshin War, she was sent north in pursuit of the remnants of the Tokugawa navy to Ezo (modern Hokkaido). At the Battle of Hakodate, she shelled the Goryōkaku, scoring a hit on one of its yagura.

During the Naval Battle of Hakodate Bay on 26 April 1869, she engaged Kaiten Maru, firing over 40 shots from her cannon. However, on 11 May she was engaged by the Republic of Ezo paddle schooner Banryū. A shot from Banryū penetrated Chōyō Maru′s gunpowder magazine, causing a massive explosion. Some 80 of her crewmen went down with the ship, and the bodies of another six were later recovered from the ocean. However, Captain Nakamura survived the sinking.
