= SMS Danzig (1851) =

Paddle steam corvette warship of the Prussian and Tokugawa Shogunate navies

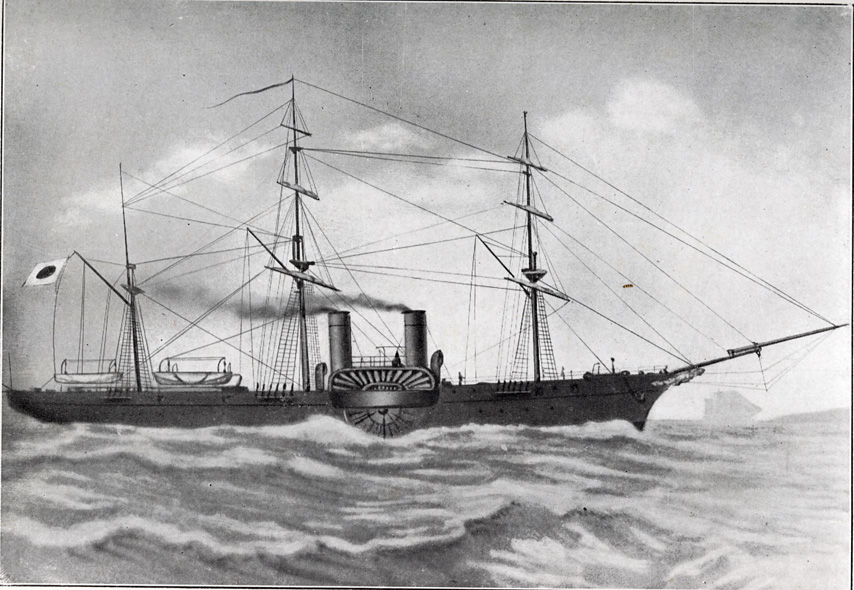
- Illustration of Kaiten Maru

History

Prussia
- Name: Danzig
- Ordered: 15 March 1850
- Laid down: 1850
- Completed: June 1853
- Commissioned: 12 July 1851
- Decommissioned: 30 September 1860
- Stricken: 1 September 1862
- Fate: Sold, 1864?

History

Tokugawa shogunate
- Acquired: 1864
- Renamed: Kaiten Maru (回天丸)

History

Republic of Ezo
- Acquired: 1869
- Fate: Destroyed by fire, 20 June 1869

General characteristics
- Type: Paddle frigate
- Displacement: 1,920 t (1,890 long tons)
- Length: 75.66 m (248 ft 3 in)
- Beam: 16.5 m (54 ft 2 in)
- Installed power: 400 ihp (300 kW)
- Propulsion: Marine steam engine
- Sail plan: Full-rigged ship
- Speed: 11.6 knots (21.5 km/h; 13.3 mph)
- Complement: 153
- Armament: 10 68-pounder bombards

SMS Danzig (Note: "SMS" stands for "Seiner Majestät Schiff" (German: His Majesty's Ship).) was a paddle corvette of the Prussian Navy. She was the lead warship during the Battle of Tres Forcas in 1856, one of the first examples of Prussian gunboat diplomacy. She was later decommissioned from the Prussian Navy and served in the navy of the Japanese Tokugawa shogunate as the Kaiten (Japanese: 回天) from 1864 until 1869, and then briefly with the breakaway Ezo Republic until her destruction later the same year.

== Construction ==
Danzig's design was conceived by the British engineer John Scott Russell and it was originally planned to build her in the United Kingdom. However, Prince Adalbert of Prussia (1811–1873) decided to build the vessel in Danzig instead to stimulate the local economy. The keel was laid at JW Klawitter's works there on 24 August 1850, with the copper mined near Berlin, the wood for the hull coming from the outskirts of Danzig and the iron imported from England. She entered service in June 1853.

== Career ==
=== First voyage ===
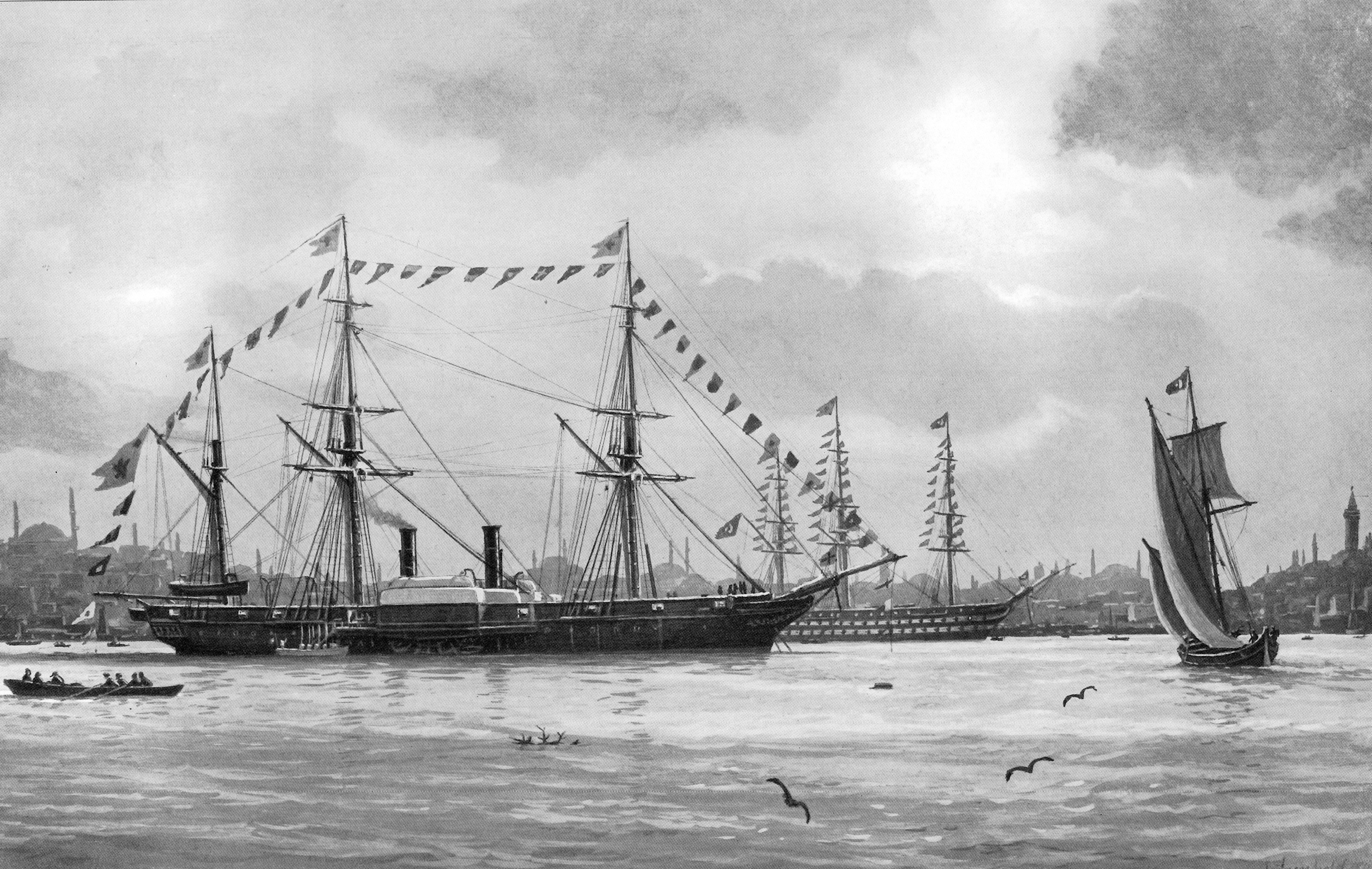
Die preußische Radkorvette S.M.S. DANZIG vor Konstantinopel 1853. Gemälde von Lüder Arenhold (1854-1915) 1905

Danzig's first voyage was on 12 July 1853 to pick up her armament of ten 68-pounder guns from Deptford. The guns had to be picked up directly, since they could not be exported due to the demands of the Crimean War). She had a crew of 220 officers and men.

Because of the 1853 conflict between the Ottoman and the Russian Empire, the vessel was then sent to Constantinople in September of that year, together with other Prussian units, to protect Prussian interests. From April to June 1854, the ship was in Piraeus to protect Otto of Greece (a member of the House of Wittelsbach), because he was threatened by a revolution. After this, the ship sailed to Syros to pick up a load of marble for Berlin Museums.

=== Battle of Tres Forcas ===
In the spring of 1856, a squadron under the leadership of Prince Adalbert, including the Danzig as flagship, the Thetis, the Amazone, the Mercur and the Frauenlob, sailed in the Atlantic Ocean to practise. As Danzig was the only ship with an engine, she had to tow the other vessels in case of no wind (Flaute).

At the invitation of Napoleon III, she visited Cherbourg. Due to differences between Prince Adalbert and the ship's commander, Wilhelm von Hessen-Philippsthal-Barchfeld, the prince dismissed the commander until reaching Gibraltar. In the meantime, the ship was commanded by Artur von Bothwell.

Prince Adalbert planned a punitive expedition against Riffian pirates, who had in 1852 attacked the brig Flora. This expedition lead to the battle of Tres Forcas, which failed both on military as political terms, resulting in the death of seven crew members as well as 22 wounded, including the then 16-year old (later Admiral) Eduard von Knorr. The battle is considered to be one of the first examples of German gunboat diplomacy.

After the battle, the ship sailed to Syra, where antique coffins where loaded for Berlin Museums. On 20 November 1856, she returned to Danzig, where she would be decommissioned.

=== Decommissioning ===
Due to severe dry rot damage to the hull, the navy considered replacing Danzig's wooden hull with iron, but this plan was ultimately scratched on cost grounds. She was therefore only occasionally in service from 1859 to 1860 and was finally struck from the navy list on 1 September 1862, especially since paddle steamers like her were now technically obsolete compared to steam screw. She was sold to the English firm Dorset and Blythe for 56,000 taler.

=== Service with Japanese forces ===
Now renamed the Eagle, the ship sailed to England in 1864, where she was bought later the same year by the Tokugawa shogunate, which renamed her as the Kaiten. She was armed with 13 cannons, and during the Boshin War was operated by forces loyal to the shōgun.

She was the key actor in the Naval Battle of Miyako Bay, in which, after a failed attempt to board and overtake the Kōtetsu, she was forced to flee ahead of the Imperial Japanese Navy. She was then the flagship of the Ezo navy during the Naval Battle of Hakodate Bay.

Later in the war, Kaiten was beached at Aomori Bay near Hakodate on 6 May 1869 and burned by her crew on 20 June the same year to prevent her falling into enemy hands – the Prussian corvette Medusa happened to be present and observed the burning.

In the late Meiji Era, Arai Ikunosuke, once the Navy Minister of the Republic of Ezo, wrote an extensive article on the Kaiten in the historical journal "Kyū Bakufu".

== Sources ==
=== Bibliography ===
- Hildebrand, Hans H.; Röhr, Albert; Steinmetz, Hans-Otto (1993). Die Deutschen Kriegsschiffe [German Warships]. Vol. 2. Ratingen: Mundus. ISBN 978-3-8364-9743-5.
- Stichwort: Dampf-Korvette „Danzig“, in: Hans H. Hildebrand/Albert Röhr/Hans-Otto Steinmetz: Die deutschen Kriegsschiffe. Biographien – ein Spiegel der Marinegeschichte von 1815 bis zur Gegenwart, Ratingen o.J. (Einbändiger Nachdruck der siebenbändigen Originalausgabe, Herford 1979ff.,) vol. 2, p. 26–29.
- Jürgen Duppler: Der Juniorpartner. England und die Entwicklung der Deutschen Marine 1848-1890, Herford 1985
- Jürgen Duppler: Prinz Adalbert von Preußen. Gründer der deutschen Marine, Herford 1986
- 7. August. 1856. Prinz Adalbert von Preußen bei Tres Forcas, in: Walter Lohmann: Denkwürdige Tage aus der deutschen Marine-, Kolonial- und Seekriegsgschichte. Ein Traditionskalender für die Reichsmarine, Berlin 1928, p. 156f
- Chapter 6: Prinz Adalbert von Preußen, in: Wilhelm Wolfslast (Fritz-Otto Busch): Helden der See. Band 1: Entdecker und Admirale, Berlin 1944, pp. 89–101
- Günter Stavorius, Peter P.E. Günther (ed.). Tagebuch an Bord Sr. Majestät Dampf-Korvette "Danzig" auf der Reise von Danzig nach London, Konstantinopel, Athen, Syra 1853/54. Geführt von Eduard Arendt, Leutnant zur See 2. Klasse, Berlin und Trappenkamp 1998, no ISBN
- Otto Mielke: Die erste preußische Dampfkorvette. Raddampfkorvette "Danzig", SOS-Schicksale deutscher Schiffe No. 146, München (Moewig-Verlag) o. J. [c. 1958]
