= Japanese warship Banryū =

Warship of the Tokugawa Navy

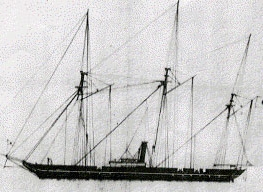
- Banryū

History

Empire of Japan
- Name: Banryū (ex Emperor)
- Ordered: 1856
- Builder: R & H Green of Blackwall
- Laid down: 1856
- Launched: 1856
- Commissioned: 1857
- Decommissioned: 1888
- Fate: Broken up late 1890s

General characteristics
- Displacement: 370 long tons (376 t)
- Length: 41.8 m (137 ft 2 in)
- Beam: 5.45 m (17 ft 11 in)
- Draught: 3.23 m (10 ft 7 in)
- Propulsion: Steam engine
- Sail plan: Schooner
- Armament: 6 × 12-pounder cannon

Banryū (蟠龍; Coiled Dragon) was a ship of the Tokugawa Navy, and following the collapse of the shogunate, was operated by Tokugawa loyalists under the Republic of Ezo during the Boshin War in Japan. An armed iron hulled screw-propelled schooner, she had a length of 41.8 metres, a breadth of 5.45 metres, a draught of 3.23 metres, and weighed 370 tons. She was armed with four 12-pounder bronze cannons.

Built by R&H Green at the Blackwall Yard as HMY Emperor, she was presented to the Tokugawa administration by James Bruce, 8th Earl of Elgin as a present for the "Emperor" from Queen Victoria on the 26 August 1858, to commemorate the signing of the Anglo-Japanese Treaty of Amity and Commerce. Intended to serve as a royal yacht, its interior was luxuriously furnished with sculptures and mirrors.

During the Boshin War, Banryū participated in the Naval Battle of Awa, Japan's first engagement between two modern fleets, on 28 January 1868. Subsequently, she was used to transport Shōgun Tokugawa Yoshinobu from Edo to exile in Sumpu following the Fall of Edo to imperial forces of 11 April.

Under the command of Bankichi Matsuoka, she was one of the ships seized by Enomoto Takeaki and other Tokugawa loyalists in their escape to create the Republic of Ezo in Hokkaido later that year. Matsuoka was dispatched to participate to the Naval Battle of Miyako Bay in March 1869, but had to return to Hachinohe due to the weather. During the Naval Battle of Hakodate Bay in May 1869, she sank one of the Imperial navy's warships, the steam corvette Chōyō Maru in the first recorded modern warship being sunk in ship to ship combat in Japanese history. Towards the end of the battle, with her ammunition exhausted and suffering from severe damage due to numerous hits, she was beached near Benten Daiba, and set on fire (although the fire went out before it could consume the vessel).

She was salvaged by an Englishman, and after repairs and rebuilding in Shanghai was renamed the SS Emperor. She then returned to Japan in 1873 as Raiden Maru (雷電丸) for use in transporting colonists and supplies to Hokkaido. She was purchased by the Imperial Japanese Navy in 1877 as Raiden, serving as a training vessel until January 1888. Afterwards, she was demilitarised, and served as a whaling ship out of Kochi, and later as a transport, passing through several owners until she was scrapped in 1897.

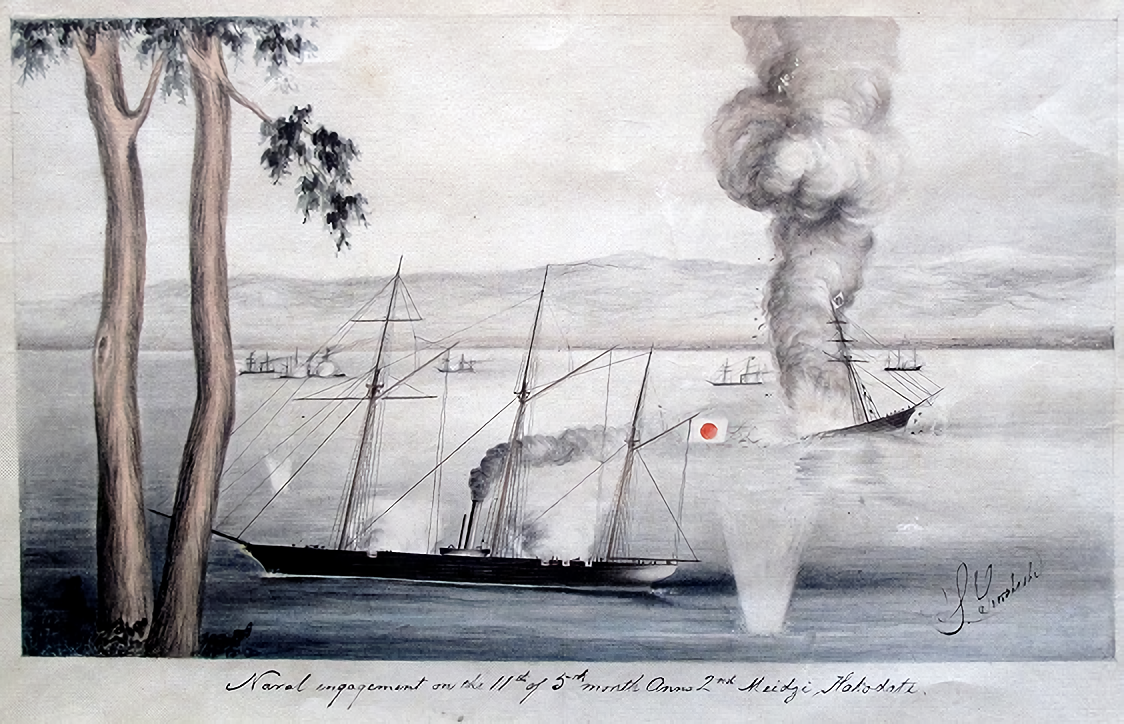
Banryū destroying the Imperial warship Chōyō in the 1869 Naval Battle of Hakodate Bay.
