= Battle of Miyako Bay =

1869 naval engagement during the Boshin War

- Part of the Boshin War
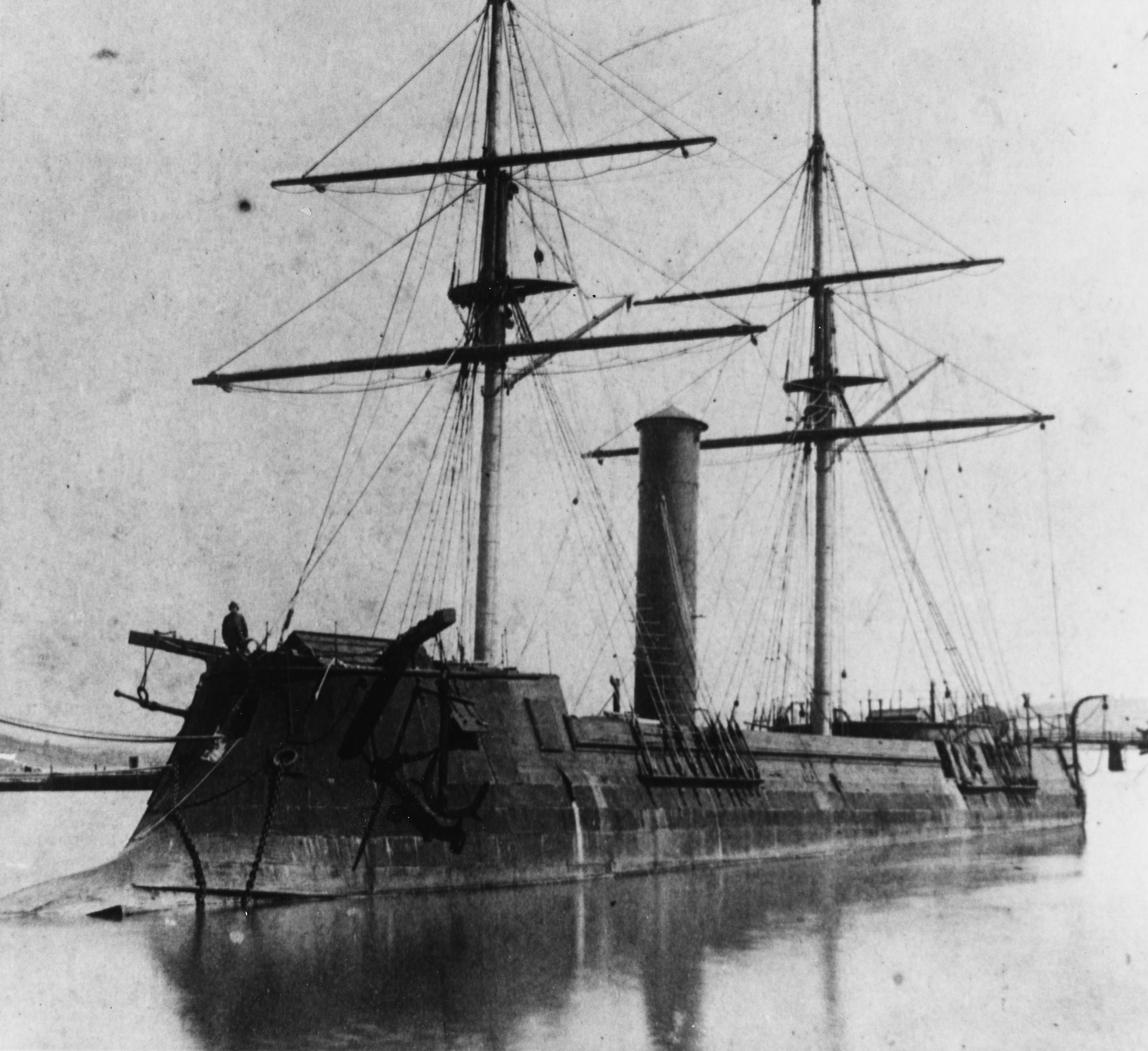
- The ironclad Kōtetsu
Date	6 May 1869
Location	Miyako Bay, Iwate Prefecture, Japan 39.66°N 142.00°E
Result	Imperial victory

Belligerents
Empire of Japan	Ezo Republic

Commanders and leaders
Masuda Toranosuke; Shirō Nakajima	Arai Ikunosuke; Eugène Collache; Kōga Gengo †

Strength
1 steam ironclad 7 steam warships 2,500 sailors & officers	3 steam warships 500 samurai

Casualties and losses
4 killed 3 steam warships damaged	15 killed 1 steam warship scuttled
- Location within Japan Battle of Miyako Bay (Iwate Prefecture)

The Battle of Miyako Bay (宮古湾海戦, Miyako-wan Kaisen) was a naval action on 6 May 1869, in which samurai loyalists of the former Tokugawa shogunate under the flag of the newly formed Republic of Ezo failed to take over the Kōtetsu, the flagship of the Imperial forces of the new Meiji government. It was part of the overall Battle of Hakodate at the end of the Boshin War.

== Preparations ==
Despite the surrender of Edo Castle to the new Meiji government and heavy losses at the Battles of Ueno and Aizu, many of the military forces and leaders loyal to the former Tokugawa shogunate refused to accept defeat. With the Ōuetsu Reppan Dōmei in tatters, a portion of the Tokugawa Navy led by Admiral Enomoto Takeaki fled to the northern island of Hokkaidō, together with several thousand soldiers and a handful of French military advisors, and established the Republic of Ezo.

The newly created Imperial Japanese Navy departed Tokyo Bay on 9 March 1869 and reached Miyako Bay in what is now the city of Miyako in central Iwate Prefecture, on 20 March. The Imperial fleet had been rapidly formed around the French-built ironclad warship Kōtetsu, which had been purchased from the United States. Other ships included Kasuga, Hiryū, Dai Ichi Teibō, Yōshun, and Mōshun, which had been supplied by the domains of Saga, Chōshū and Satsuma to the new central government in 1868. There were altogether eight Imperial ships: Kōtetsu, Kasuga, three small corvettes and three transport ships. Future commander-in-chief of the Imperial Japanese Navy, Tōgō Heihachirō was an officer on Kasuga at this time.

Anticipating that the Imperial fleet was en route to invade Ezo, Enomoto Takeaki decided to dispatch his three warships under the command of Kaigun bugyo Arai Ikunosuke in a boarding operation to seize the revolutionary new warship Kōtetsu, which would severely cripple the Imperial forces and would buy time for the Republic of Ezo to prepare for invasion or to negotiate more favourable terms with the Satchō Alliance.

== Action ==
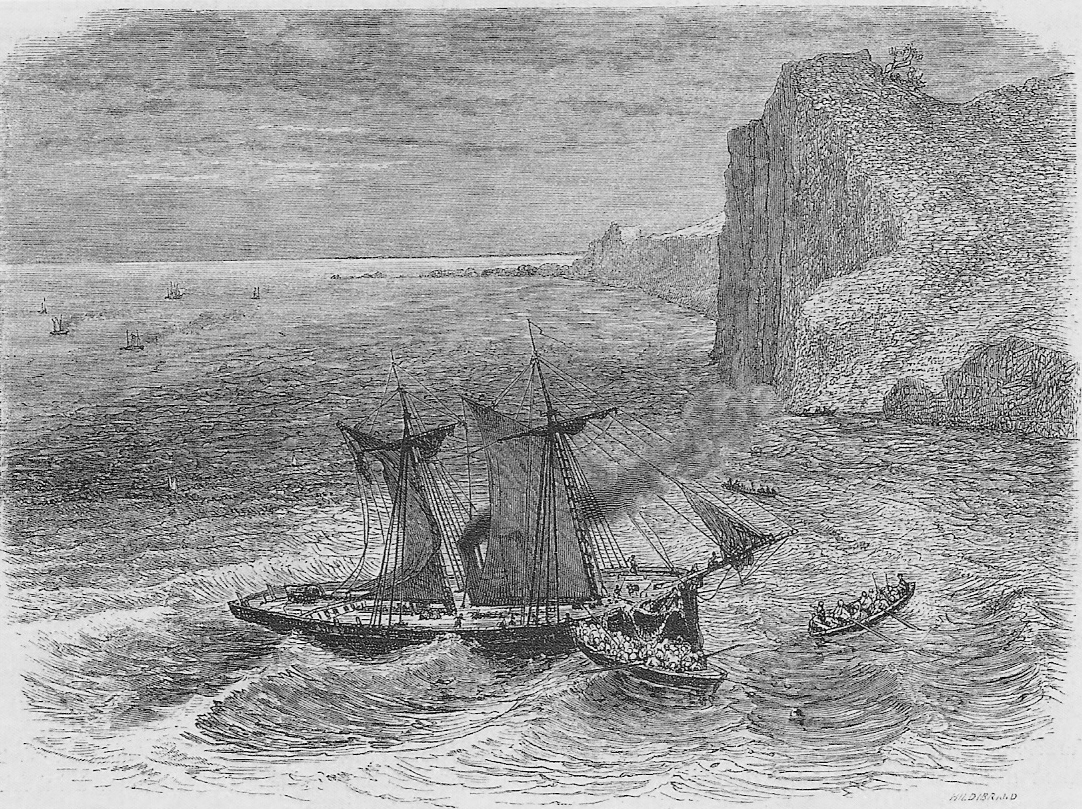
The wreckage of the Takao, pursued by steamships of the Imperial Navy

The Ezo forces were led by Kaiten (flagship of the Republic of Ezo Navy) under the command of Arai Ikunosuke, and with the elite Shinsengumi, their leader Hijikata Toshizō, as well as the former French Navy military advisor Henri Nicol. Nicol had been selected for the attack since he was a native of Bordeaux, and knew the characteristics and construction of the warship Kōtetsu, built in the same city. The overall strategy itself had been planned by another French advisor, Eugène Collache, who also accompanied the mission aboard the Takao (former Ashuelot) with the elite Shinbokutai (神木隊). The third ship in the Ezo squadron was the Banryū, with the elite Yūgekitai (遊撃隊) and former French Navy quartermaster Clateau, in charge of the cannons.

To create surprise, the squadron planned a false flag operation, with Kaiten entering Miyako Bay under an American flag. However, the operation was plagued with problems before reaching its destination. En route, the squadron encountered bad weather, in which Takao had engine trouble, and Banryū became separated. Banryū eventually returned to Hokkaidō without participating in the battle. Unable to achieve more than 3 knots (5.6 km/h) due to its engine trouble, Takao trailed far behind when Kaiten began its attack.

Kaiten approached the anchored Imperial Navy ships and raised the Republic of Ezo flag seconds before boarding Kōtetsu. She rammed her prow into the side of Kōtetsu, and started firing her guns. However, her deck was higher than that of Kōtetsu by close to three meters, forcing boarding samurai to jump one by one in a trickle. After the initial surprise had passed, Kōtetsu managed to repel the attack with a Gatling gun, inflicting great losses on the attackers. Most of the attacking samurai perished; Nicol was hit by two bullets, and boarding party commander Kōga Gengo was killed and his position taken over by Admiral Arai Ikunosuke. In the action, Kaiten damaged three Imperial warships, but finally disengaged without having captured Kōtetsu.

Kaiten steamed out of Miyako Bay, pursued by the Imperial fleet (which had been warming up their engines even before the attack began), just as Takao was entering. Kaiten eventually escaped to Hokkaidō, but Takao was too slow to outdistance its pursuers and was beached at little distance from Miyako Bay, so that her crew could escape inland, and was scuttled by explosion. The 40 crewmen (including 30 samurai and the ex-French officer Eugène Collache) managed to flee for a few days, but finally surrendered to government forces. They were brought to Tokyo for trial. Although the fate of the Japanese rebels is unknown, Collache was eventually pardoned and deported to France.

== Conclusion ==
The Naval Battle of Miyako was a daring, but desperate attempt by the Republic of Ezo forces to neutralize the powerful Kōtetsu. It was the first case of an abordage (boarding) maneuver on an ironclad steamship in Japan. Although the attempt ended in failure, the loss of the Takao was marginal. The Imperial Navy continued north unimpeded, and supported landing and combat operations of thousands of government troops in the Battle of Hakodate.
