= Goishi Coast =

Goishi Coast 種差海岸
- Region
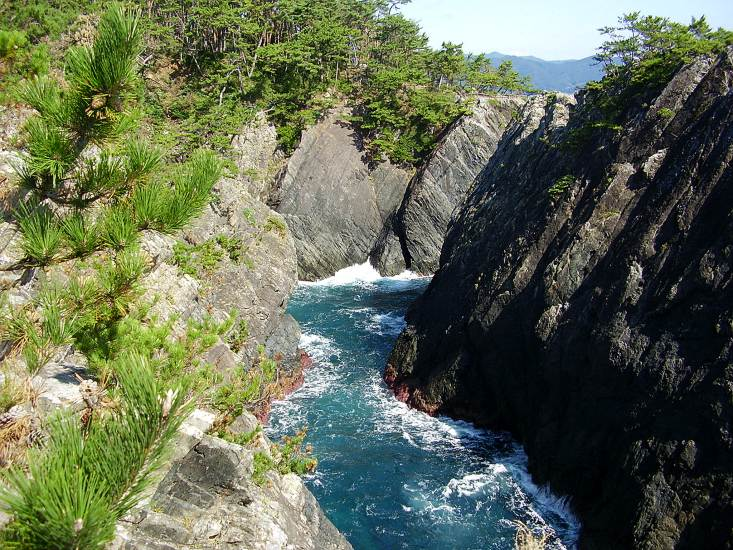
- Goishi Coast

- Location within Iwate Prefecture Location within Japan
- Coordinates: 39.022942°N 141.736293°E
- Location: Ōfunato, Iwate, Japan
- National Palace of Scenic Beauty Natural Monument

The Goishi Coast (碁石海岸, Goishi Kaigan) is section of the coastline of the Pacific Ocean located in the city of Ōfunato, Iwate Prefecture, in the Tōhoku region of northern Japan. It was nationally designated a Place of Scenic Beauty and a Natural Monument in 1937. In 1996, the Ministry of the Environment also selected the sound of the waves breaking over Kaminari iwa (雷岩) (lit. 'Thunder Rock') as one of the 100 Soundscapes of Japan.

== Overview ==
Located on the southern end of the Sanriku Coast, the name is derived from the rounded black pebbles which form the beach. Polished by the waves, these pebbles resemble the pieces used in the traditional board game of Go. The Sanriku Coast is a ria coastline with narrow, deep inlets, and rock formations carved into fantastic shapes by erosion. A six kilometer stretch of this coast was incorporated into the Rikuchu Kaigan National Park in 1955. In 2013 the park was incorporated into Sanriku Fukkō National Park.

About four kilometers of walking paths run along the cliffs, starting around the Cape Goishi Lighthouse. Near the lighthouse is the Ōfunato City Museum, a local natural history museum.

== Gallery ==
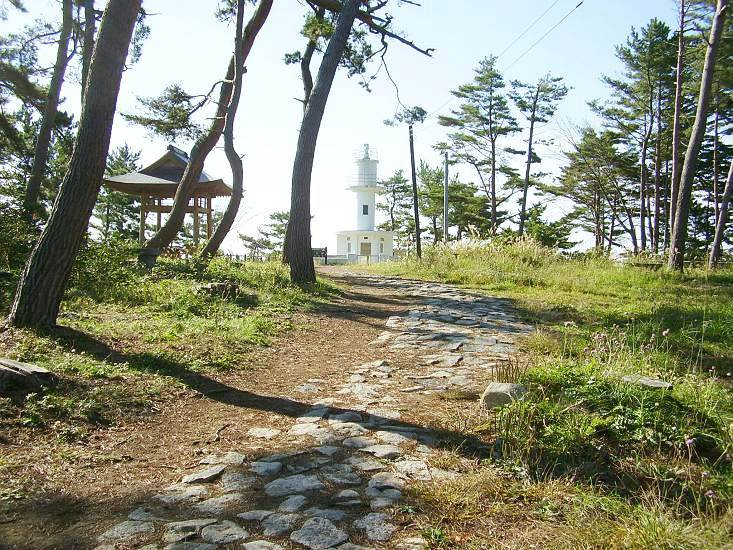
Cape Goishi

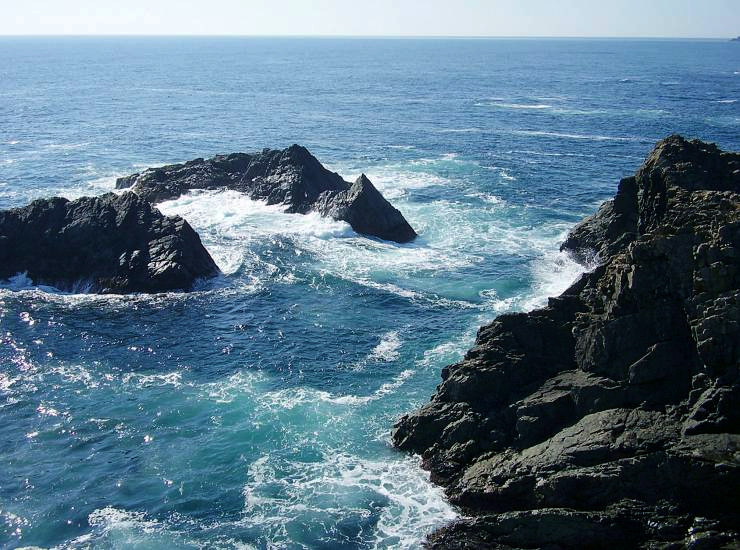
Goishi Coast

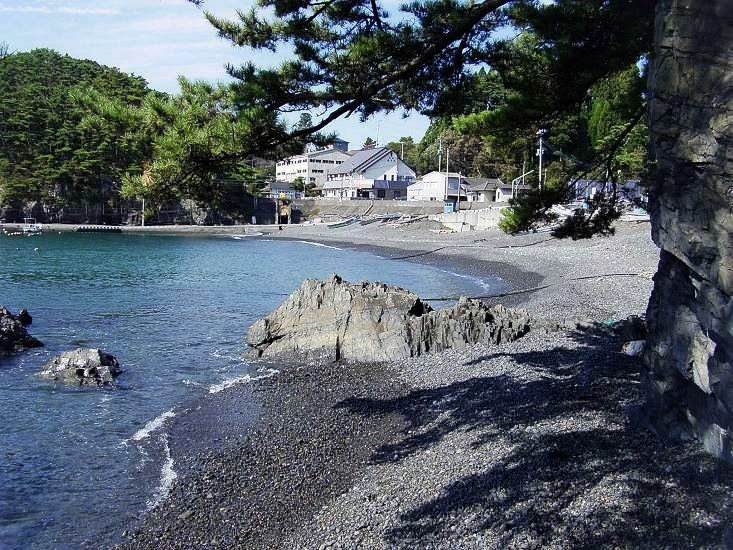
Goishi Coast

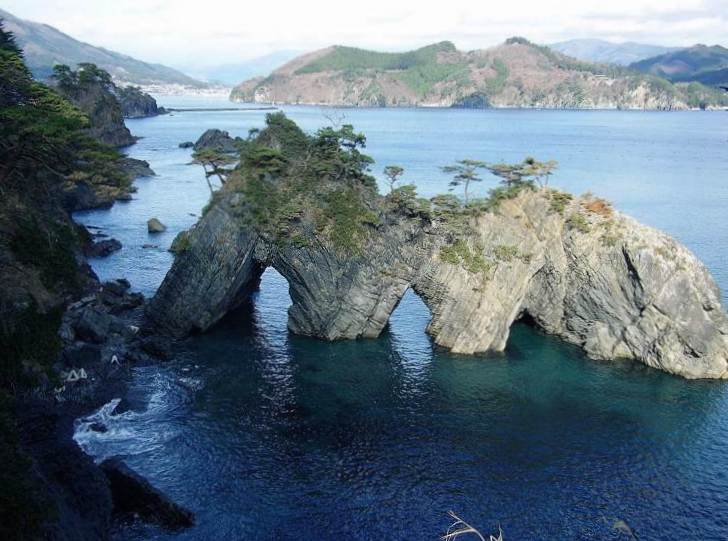
Anatoshiiso

== See also ==
- List of Places of Scenic Beauty of Japan (Iwate)
