= Arai Ikunosuke =

Japanese samurai (1836-1909)

- 荒井郁之助
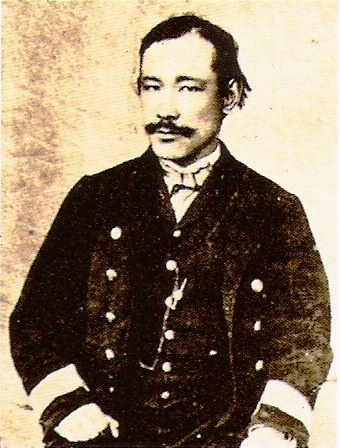
- Born: June 12, 1836; Edo, Japan
- Died: July 19, 1909 (aged 73); Tokyo, Japan

Arai Ikunosuke (荒井 郁之助; June 12, 1836 – July 19, 1909) was a Japanese samurai of the late Edo period. Prominent as Navy Minister of the Republic of Ezo, he later became famous as the first head of the Japan Meteorological Agency. Also known as Akinori (顕徳) or Akiyoshi (顕理).

== Early life ==
Arai Ikunosuke was born in the Tedai-cho district of Edo, near the Yushima Seidō shrine as the son of the Tokugawa gokenin Arai Kiyobei. His father donated his money to aid villagers from the flood of Fujigawa, which in turn angered the Tokugawa Shōgun. He began learning the Chinese classics at age 7, and on the recommendation of his uncle, starting at age 12 he studied swordsmanship (Jikishinkage ryū and Shingyōtō-ryū), archery, and horse riding. At age 14, he entered the Shogunate's academy at Shoheizaka, and at age 18, he began to study Western-style gunnery. He began his career in the Shogunate at age 20, entering into Dutch studies (rangaku), and was posted as an instructor at the Nagasaki Naval Training Center.

== Life in the 1860s ==
After studying mathematics, sailing, and navigation, Arai was appointed a director of the Naval Training Center in 1862. However, he was reassigned to the Shogunate's Kōbusho military academy in 1864, and it was there that he worked with Ōtori Keisuke, learning French-style infantry tactics in Yokohama in 1865.

== Boshin War ==
In 1868 during the Boshin War of the Meiji Restoration, Arai was assigned as a captain to the Shogunal Navy, and together with Enomoto Takeaki departed Shinagawa Harbor when Edo was surrendered to the Imperial Army. Traveling to Hokkaidō, he became Navy Minister of the new Republic of Ezo, and while he took part in the Naval Battle of Miyako Bay and the Naval Battle of Hakodate Bay, the Ezo forces were defeated, and Arai was placed in prison, where he remained pending a sentence of death. During this time, he wrote the first English-Japanese dictionary.

== Meiji Era ==
With his sentence of death commuted, Arai became involved in the Hokkaidō Development Commission, an organisation centred around developing and securing the northern frontier. Arai worked with Enomoto in land reclamation for a time, before working in the Sapporo Agricultural College in 1872. In 1877, he joined the Home Ministry in order to take part in a national triangulation project. Arai also became the head of a women's school. He was later put in charge of the Central Meteorological Agency during the Meiji period, became the first person to photograph the corona of the sun in Japan, during a solar eclipse in 1887, introduced the meter system, founded Hokkaido University, and established standard time.

Later in life, together with his old colleague Ōtori Keisuke, he contributed to the magazine Kyū Bakufu, writing articles about his experiences in the 1860s, as well as about the navy of the former Shogunate.

Arai died of diabetes in 1909, at the age of 74.

== References and further reading ==
- Fukunaga Kyōsuke. Kaishō Arai Ikunosuke. Tokyo: Morikita Shoten, 1943.
- Harada Akira. Arai Ikunosuke. Tokyo: Yoshikawa Kobunkan, 1994.
- Hillsborough, Romulus. Shinsengumi: The Shogun's Last Samurai Corps. Tuttle Publishing (2005). ISBN 0-8048-3627-2
