= List of places of scenic beauty of Japan (Iwate) =

This list is of the places of scenic beauty of Japan located within the Prefecture of Iwate.

== National Places of Scenic Beauty ==
As of 1 June 2026, eleven Places have been designated at a national level (including one *Special Place of Scenic Beauty); Landscape of Oku no Hosomichi is a serial designation spanning ten prefectures.

Site	Municipality	Comments	Image	Coordinates	Type	Ref.
*Mōtsū-ji Gardens 毛越寺庭園; Mōtsūji teien	Hiraizumi	inscribed on the UNESCO World Heritage List as a component site of Hiraizumi – Temples, Gardens and Archaeological Sites Representing the Buddhist Pure Land		38°59′18″N 141°06′30″E	1	
Scenic areas of Ihatov イーハトーブの風景地; Īhatōbu no fūkeichi	Hanamaki, Ōshū, Shizukuishi, Tōno, Sumita, Takizawa	Designation spans 7 locations connected with author Kenji Miyazawa		39°49′04″N 141°01′25″E	6, 10, 11	
Former Kanjizaiō-in Gardens 旧観自在王院庭園; Kyū-Kanjizaiōin teien	Hiraizumi	inscribed on the UNESCO World Heritage List as a component site of Hiraizumi – Temples, Gardens and Archaeological Sites Representing the Buddhist Pure Land		38°59′17″N 141°06′37″E	1	
Genbikei 厳美渓; Genbikei	Ichinoseki	also a Natural Monument		38°56′32″N 141°03′07″E	6	
Goishi Coast 碁石海岸; Goishi-kaigan	Ōfunato	also a Natural Monument		38°59′19″N 141°44′35″E	7	
Takata-matsubara 高田松原; Takata-matsubara	Rikuzentakata			39°00′17″N 141°37′52″E	3, 8	
Sangojima 珊琥島; Sangojima	Ōfunato			39°02′13″N 141°43′38″E	8	
Jōdogahama 浄土ヶ浜; Jōdogahama	Miyako			39°38′56″N 141°58′54″E	8	
Ogami and Megami Rocks - Mount Torigoe 男神岩・女神岩・鳥越山; Ogami-iwa・Megami-iwa・Torigoe-yama	Ninohe/Ichinohe			40°14′47″N 141°16′21″E	5	
Geibikei 猊鼻渓; Geibikei	Ichinoseki			38°59′17″N 141°15′40″E	6	
Landscape of Oku no Hosomichi - Kinkeizan-Takadachi おくのほそ道の風景地 金鶏山 高館; Oku no Hosomichi no fūkei-chi Kinkeizan Takadachi	Hiraizumi	designation spans ten prefectures; Kinkeizan is inscribed on the UNESCO World Heritage List as a component site of Hiraizumi – Temples, Gardens and Archaeological Sites Representing the Buddhist Pure Land		38°59′36″N 141°06′33″E		

== Prefectural Places of Scenic Beauty ==
As of 1 May 2025, three Places have been designated at a prefectural level.

Site	Municipality	Comments	Image	Coordinates	Type	Ref.
Funakoshi Coast 船越海岸; Funakoshi-kaigan	Yamada	within Rikuchū Kaigan National Park		39°26′57″N 142°02′39″E		
Aomatsushima 青松島; Aomatsushima	Rikuzentakata	also a Prefectural Natural Monument		38°56′20″N 141°42′34″E		
Jōdogahama 浄土ヶ浜; Jōdogahama	Miyako			39°38′56″N 141°58′54″E	8	

== Municipal Places of Scenic Beauty ==
As of 1 May 2025, eight Places have been designated at a municipal level.

== Registered Places of Scenic Beauty ==
As of 19 June 2026, four Monuments have been registered (as opposed to designated) as Places of Scenic Beauty at a national level.

Place	Municipality	Comments	Image	Coordinates	Type	Ref.
Nanshō-sō Gardens 南昌荘庭園; Nanshō-sō teien	Morioka			39°42′07″N 141°09′15″E		
Moriai Family Gardens 盛合氏庭園; Moriai-shi teien	Miyako			39°34′56″N 141°56′09″E		
Former Nanbu Family Detached Residence Gardens 旧南部氏別邸庭園 kyū-Nanbu-shi bettei teien	Morioka			39°42′07″N 141°09′16″E		
Hakozaki Senjōjiki 御箱崎の千畳敷; Ohakozaki no Senjōhiki	Kamaishi			39°21′02″N 141°59′44″E		

== See also ==
- Cultural Properties of Japan
- List of Historic Sites of Japan (Iwate)
- List of parks and gardens of Iwate Prefecture
- List of Cultural Properties of Japan – paintings (Iwate)
