= Jōdogahama =

Part of the Rikuchū Kaigan National Park, Japan

- IUCN category III (natural monument or feature)
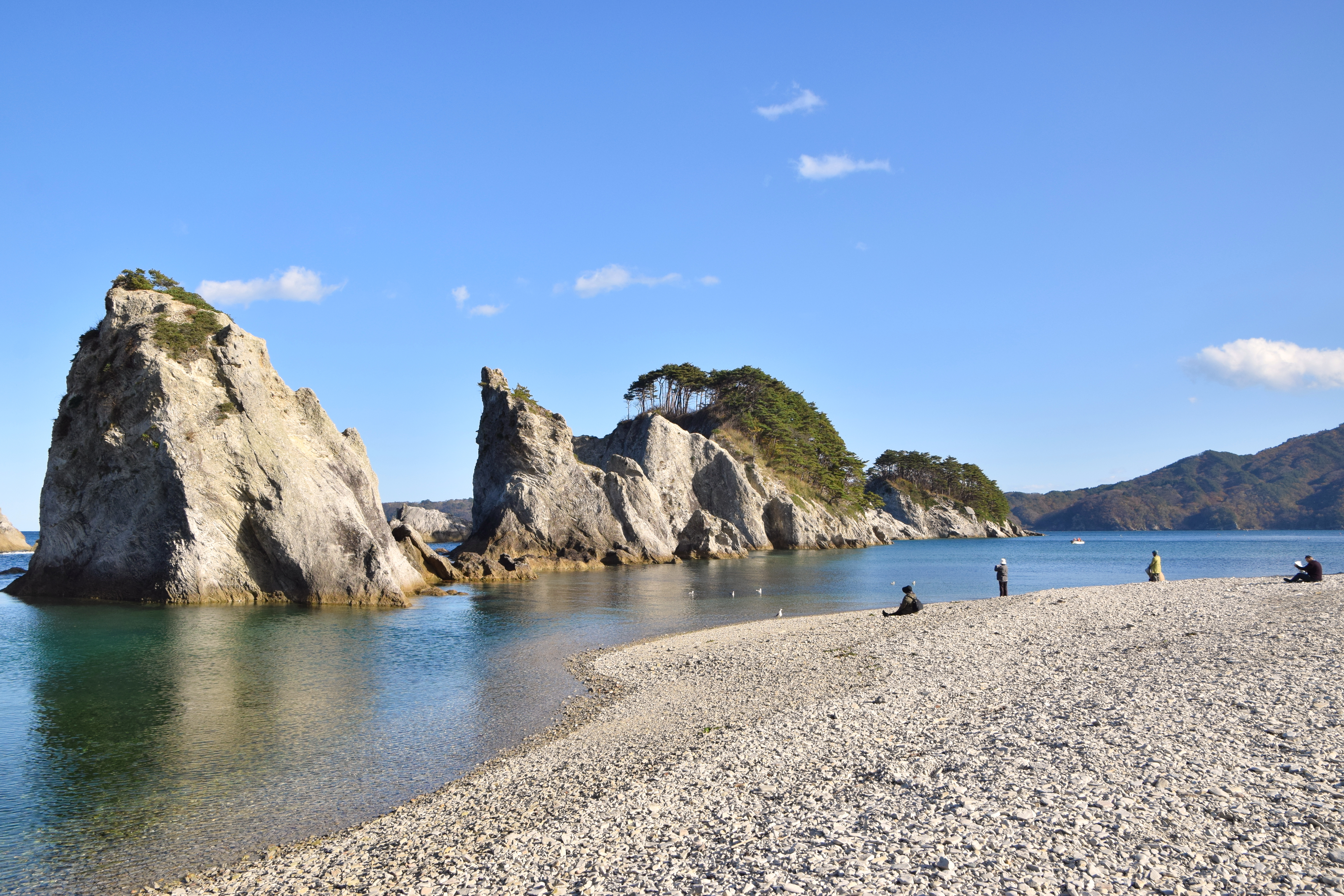
- typical rock formations at Jōdogahama

- Location within Iwate Prefecture Location within Japan
- Location: Miyako, Iwate Prefecture, Japan
- Coordinates: 39°38′56″N 141°58′54″E
- National Palace of Scenic Beauty

Jōdogahama (浄土ヶ浜) (lit. 'Pure Land Beach') is a series of rock formations along the coast of Miyako Bay in the city of Miyako, Iwate Prefecture, in the Tōhoku region of northern Japan. The area is part of the Sanriku Fukkō National Park, and is a nationally designated Place of Scenic Beauty.

== Overview ==
The area consists of groups of Paleogene period volcanic rock formations in a sandy beach area, which have been weathered by wind and rains into fantastic shapes. Together with Japanese red pine trees, the rocks form a natural version of a Japanese garden. The rock formations have inspired many fanciful names, and by the early Edo period has been identified in popular imagination with various landscape features of the Buddhist Western Paradise. The name of "Jōdogahama" was coined by a Sōtō Zen priest who toured the area in the Tenna era (1681–1684), and this name appears in the official records of Morioka Domain under the rule of Nanbu Toshitaka in 1797. The area was also popularised by the works of Kenji Miyazawa in 1917.

Formerly part of the Rikuchū Kaigan National Park from its formation in May 1955, the area was incorporated into the Sanriku Fukkō National Park after the 2011 Tōhoku earthquake and tsunami.

== Gallery ==
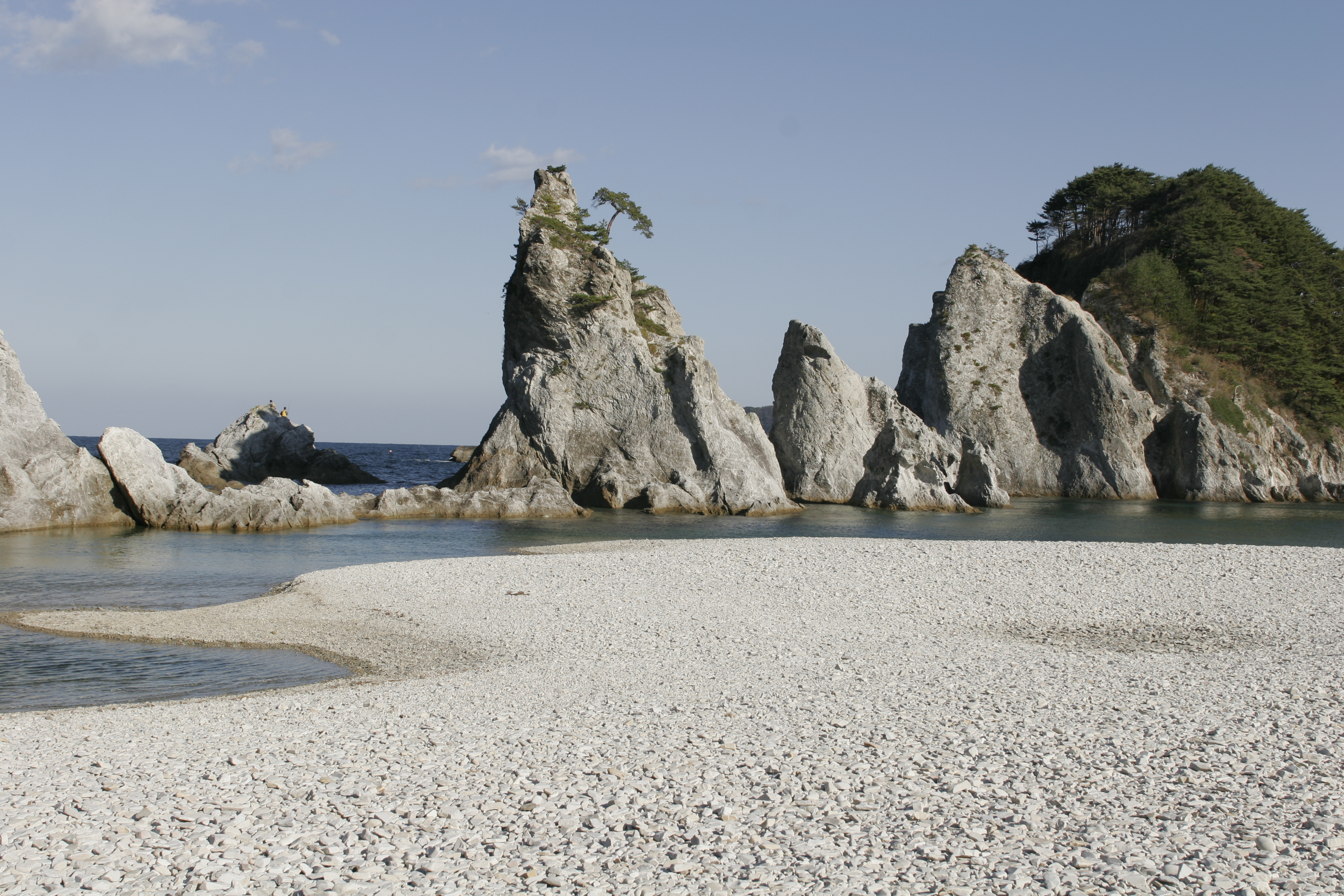

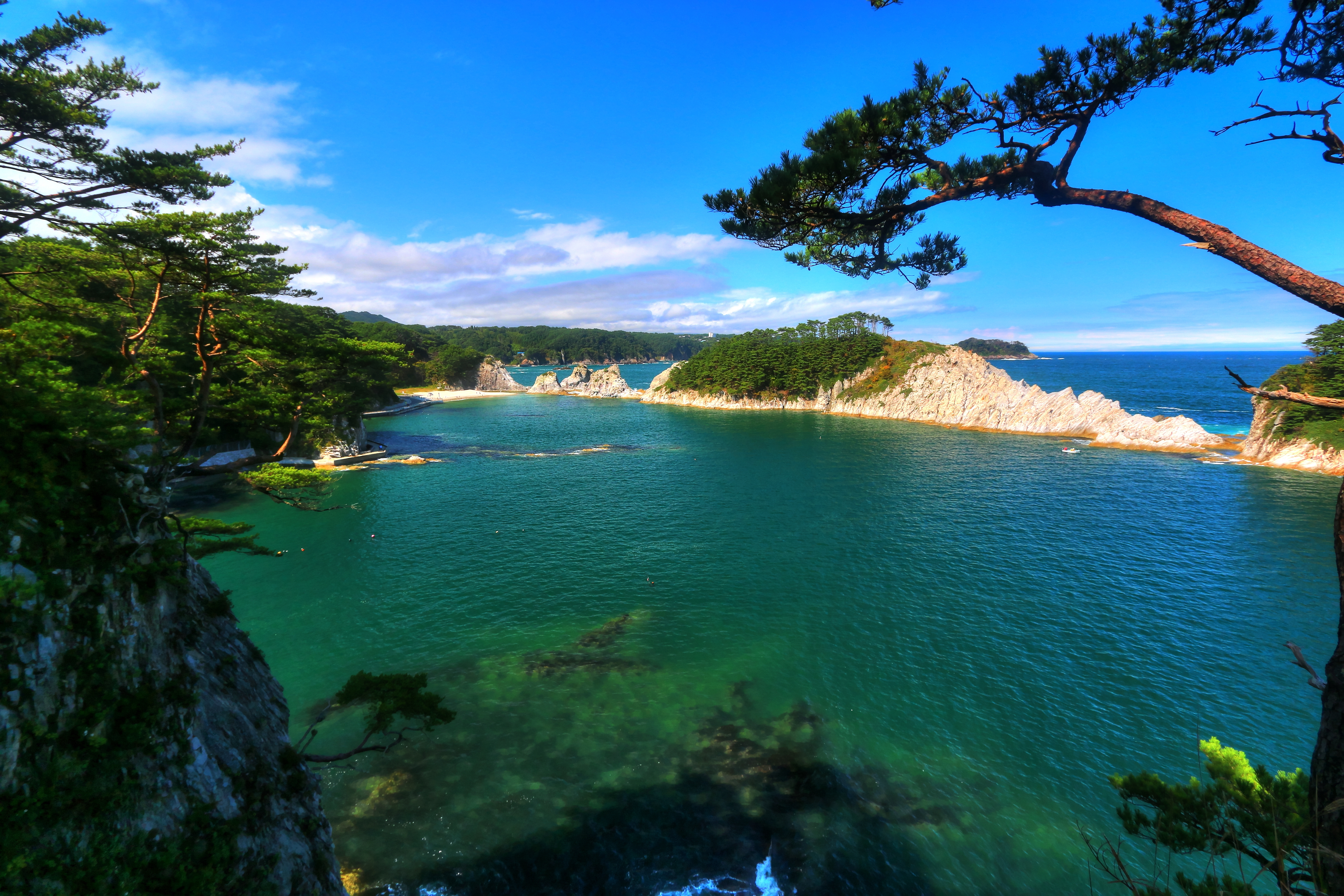

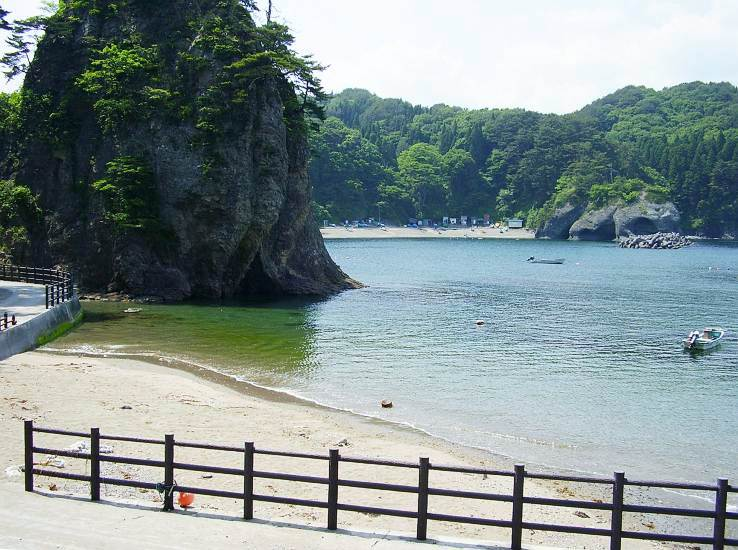

== See also ==
- National Parks of Japan
- List of Places of Scenic Beauty of Japan (Iwate)
- Hotokegaura
