= Henri Nicol =

Henri Paul Hipolito Nicol was an officer of the French Navy in the 19th century. Based on the ship Minerva of the French Oriental Fleet, he deserted when the ship was anchored at Yokohama harbour, with his friend Eugène Collache to rally other French officers, led by Jules Brunet, who had embraced the cause of the Bakufu in the Boshin War.

Nicol was a classmate of Collache at the Ecole Navale, France's Military Academy, where he had learnt some Japanese.

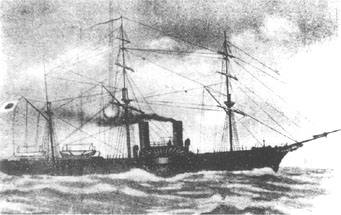
Henri Nicol participated to the Naval Battle of Miyako on board the Kaiten.

Nicol participated to the Naval Battle of Miyako, when three Bakufu warships were dispatched for a surprise attack against Imperial forces. He was on the Kaiten together with the samurai warriors, the Shinsengumi. The other ships were the Banryu and the Takao. Nicol had been selected for the main attack on the Kaiten because he was a native of Bordeaux, and happened to know well about the characteristics and construction of the revolutionary warship Kotetsu, built in the same city.

To create surprise, the Kaiten entered Miyako harbour with an American flag, and the Banryu with a Russian one. They raised the Bakufu flag seconds before boarding the Kotetsu. The Kotetsu managed to repel the attack with a Gatling gun, with huge loss on the attacking side. Nicol was severely wounded in the leg and arm.

The two rebel warships escaped back to Hokkaido however, but the Takao was pursued and wrecked herself voluntarily.

After the reddition of the Bakufu forces and the end of the conflict, Nicol was sent back to France with the other French officer. He was judged for treason, but condemned lightly. He was soon drafted as a private soldier in the Franco-Prussian War, but died in the conflict at the age of 24.
