= Genbikei =

Ravine on the Iwai River in Japan

- IUCN category III (natural monument or feature)
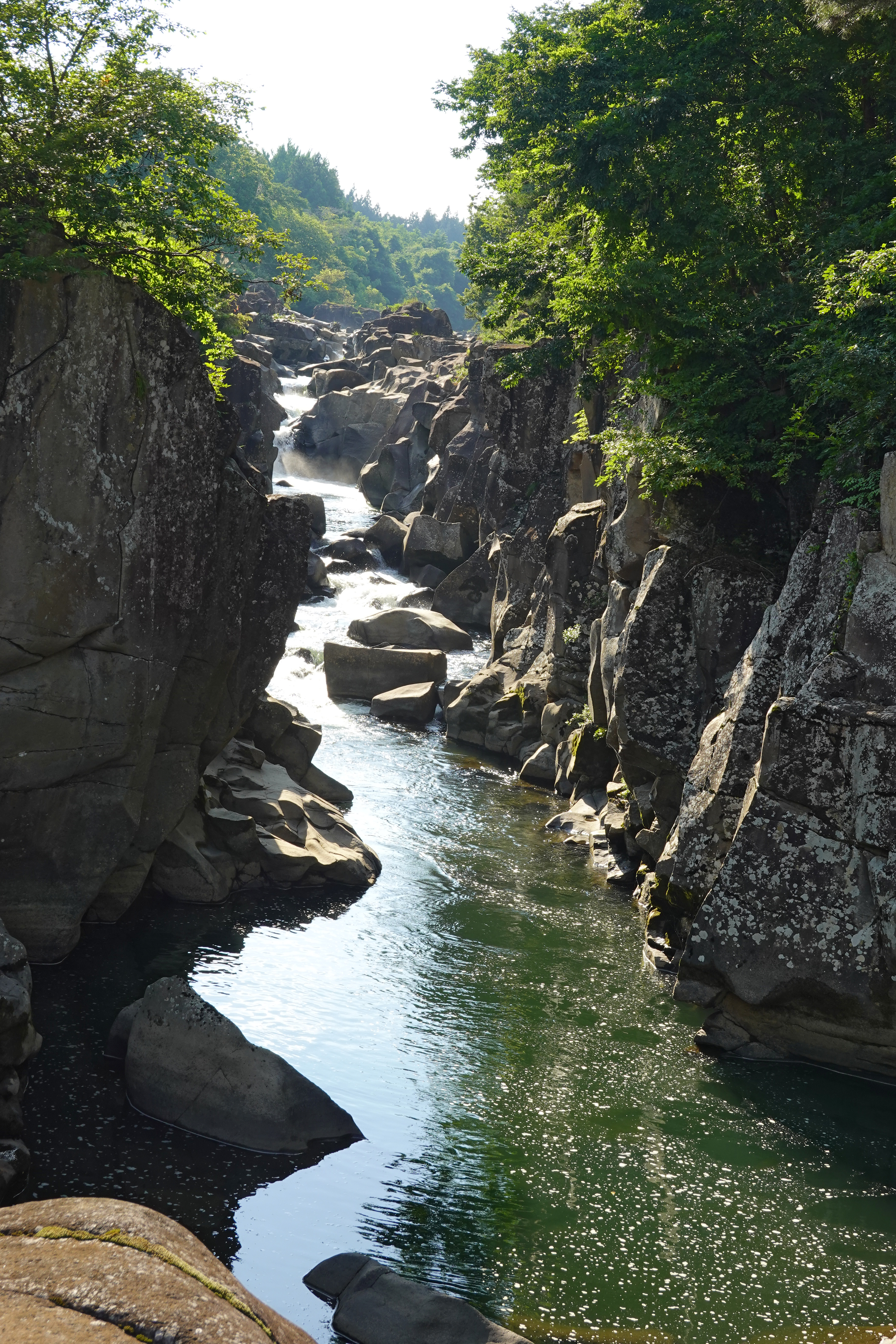
- typical panorama of Genbikei

- Location within Iwate Prefecture Location within Japan
- Location: Ichinoseki, Iwate Prefecture, Japan
- Coordinates: 38°56′40.56″N 141°2′44.52″E
- Length: 2 km (1.2 mi)
- Established: 1927
- National Palace of Scenic Beauty Natural Monument

Genbikei (厳美渓) is a two kilometer long ravine on the Iwai River in the city of Ichinoseki, Iwate Prefecture, Japan. It has been designated a National Place of Scenic Beauty and a Natural Monument since 1927.

== Overview ==
Genbeikei is in the Kurikoma Mountains in southwestern Iwate, and has been popular as a scenic spot since at least the early Edo period. The first daimyō of Sendai Domain, Date Masamune, praised this area for its scenic beauty. In August 1877, Emperor Meiji visited the ravine on his travels through the Tōhoku region, and subsequently Kōda Rohan wrote a travelogue which drew many visitors to the area.

Geologically, the ravine was formed by erosion of a thick seam of dacite tuff deposited by eruptions of Mount Kurikoma. The erosion has produced strange rock shapes, waterfalls, rapids and the formation of potholes on the river bottom.

The ravine can be reached by a bus service from Ichinoseki Station on the Tohoku Shinkansen.

== Gallery ==
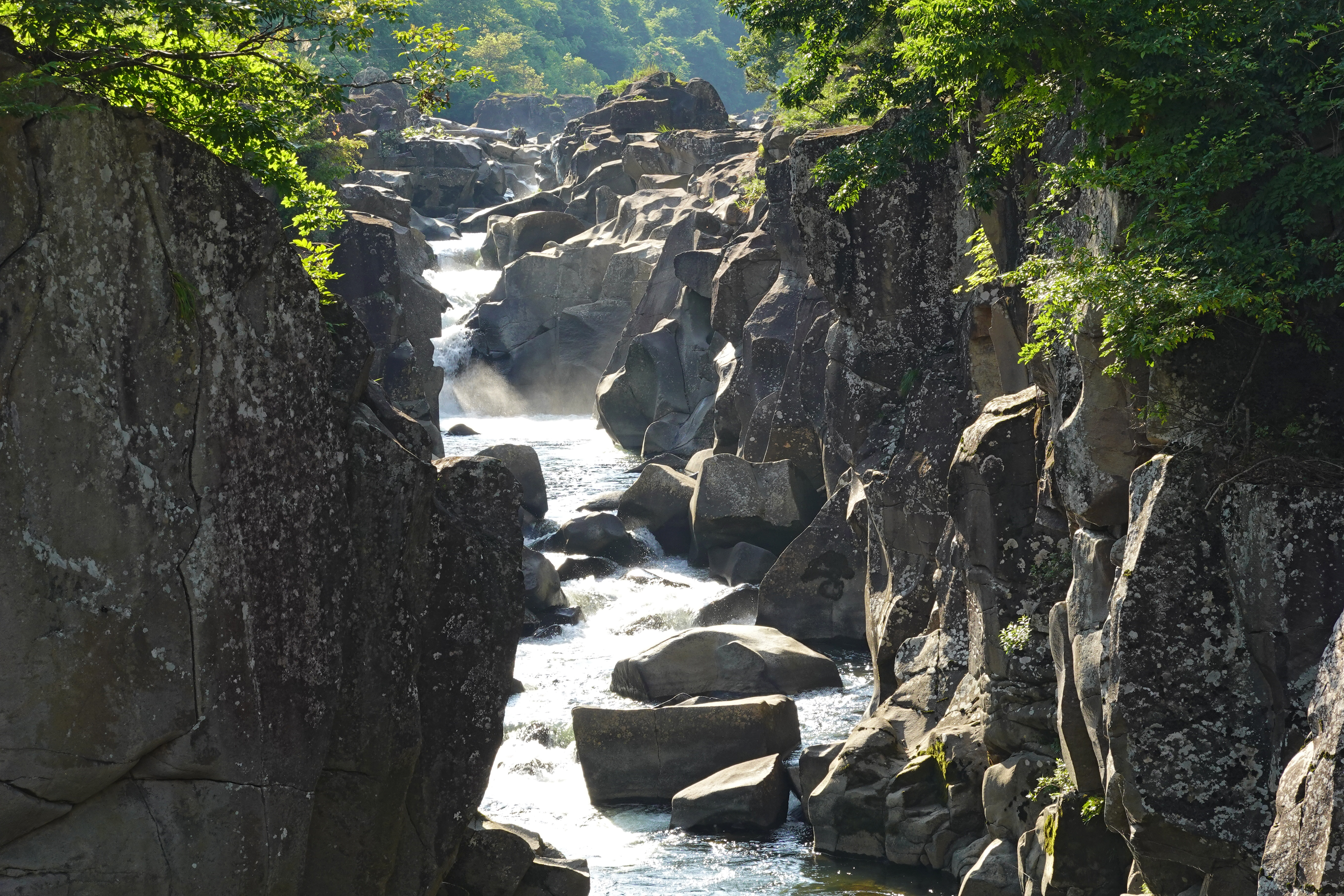

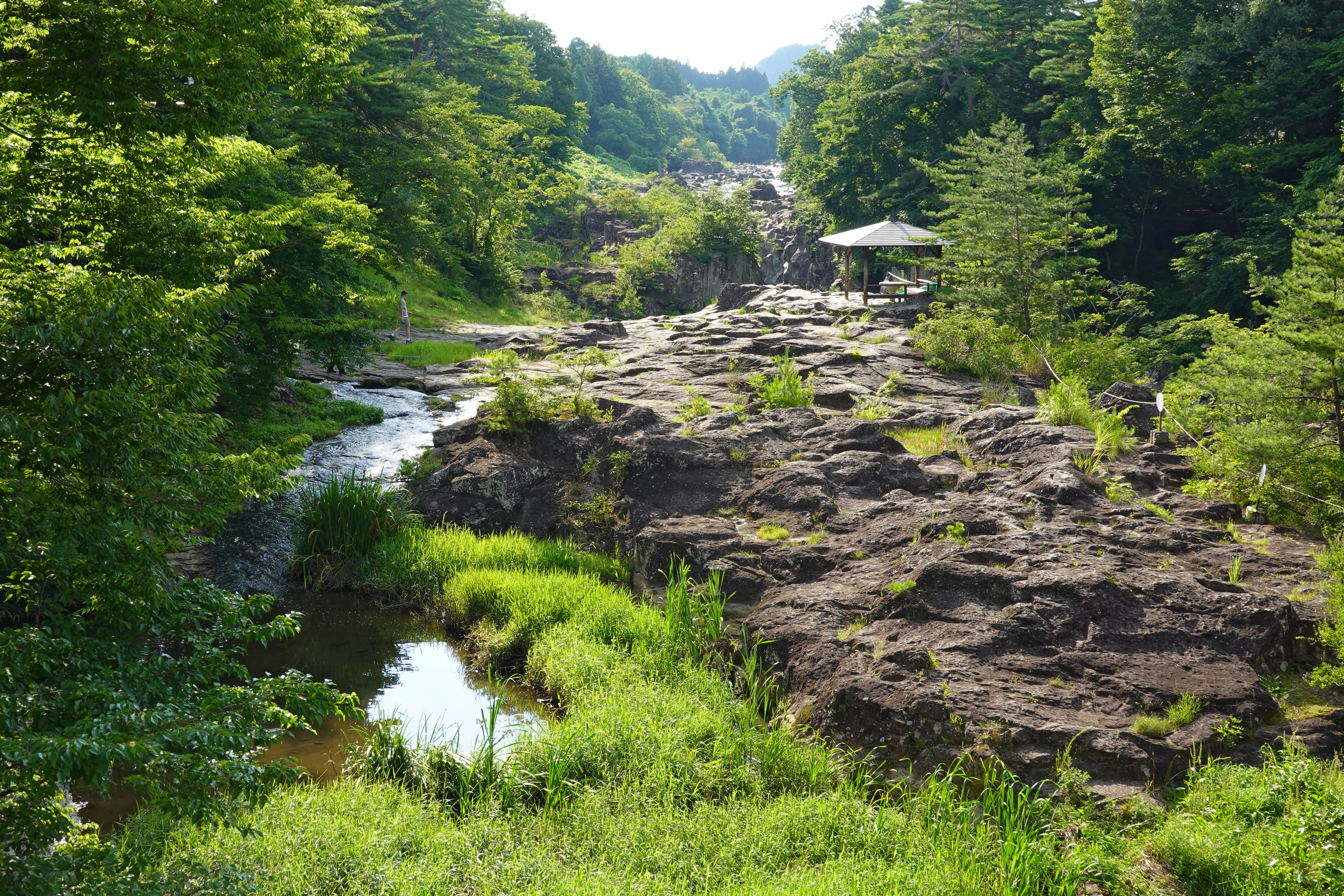

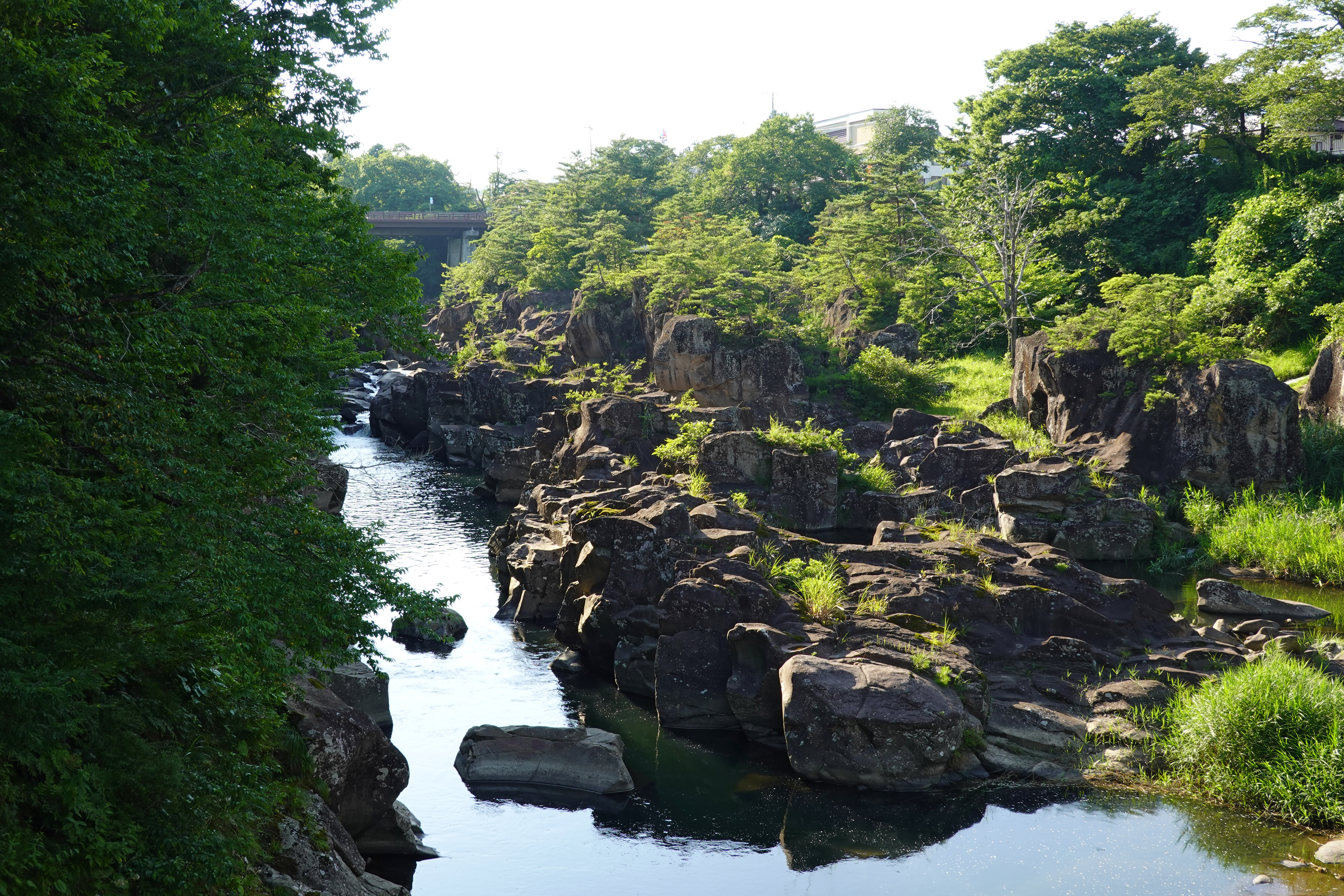

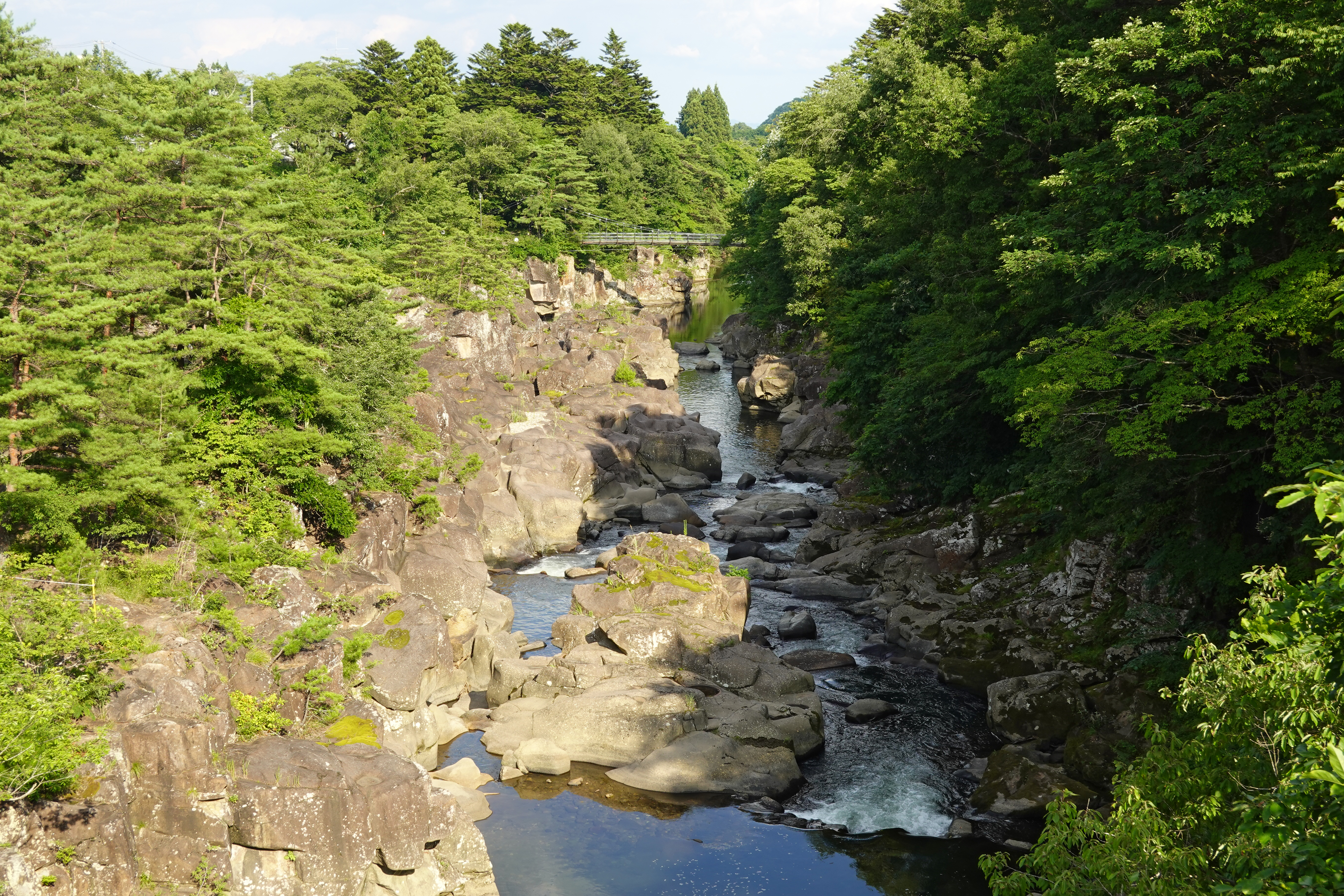

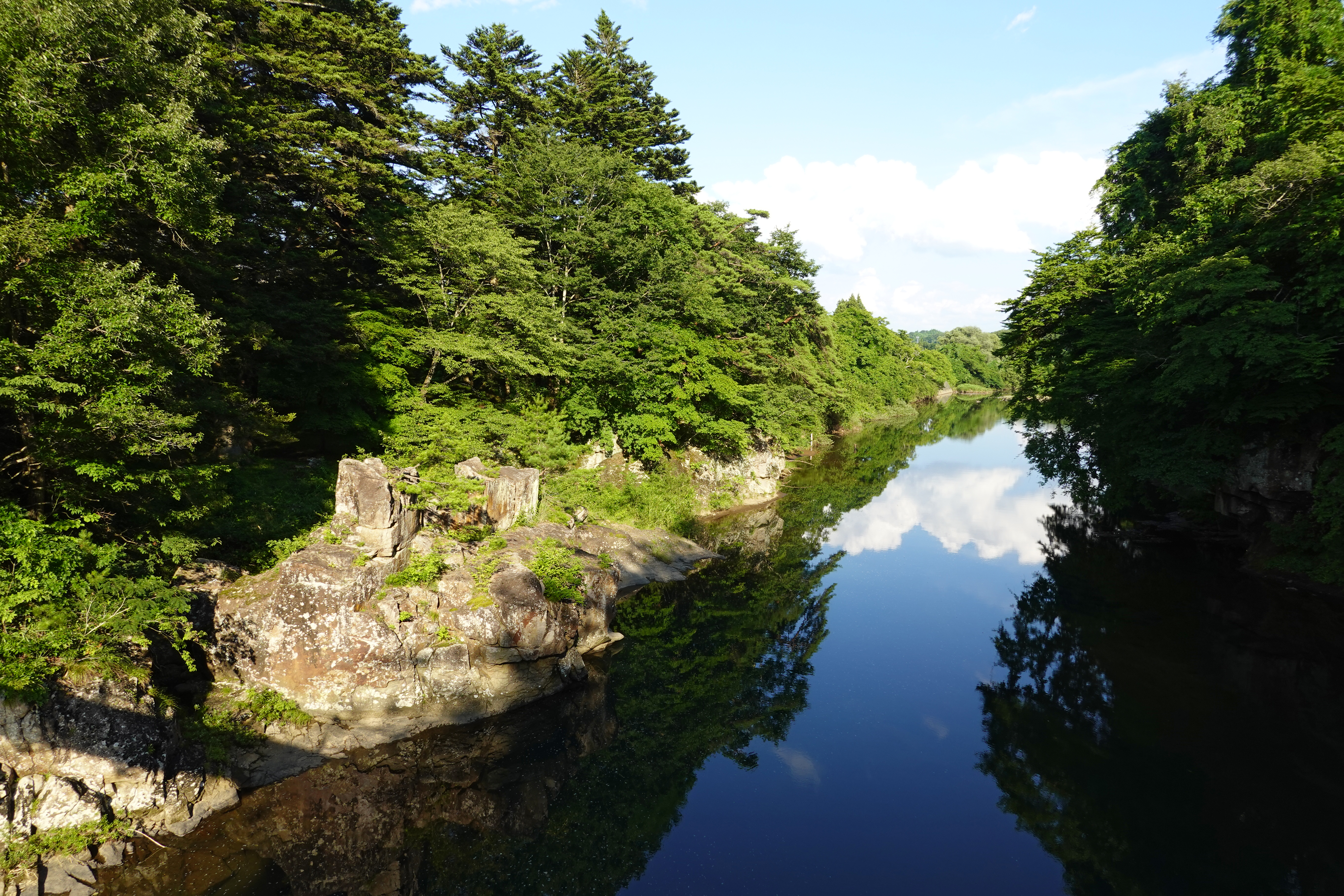

== See also ==
- List of Places of Scenic Beauty of Japan (Iwate)
- Geibikei
- Kurikoma Quasi-National Park
