= Scenic areas of Ihatov =

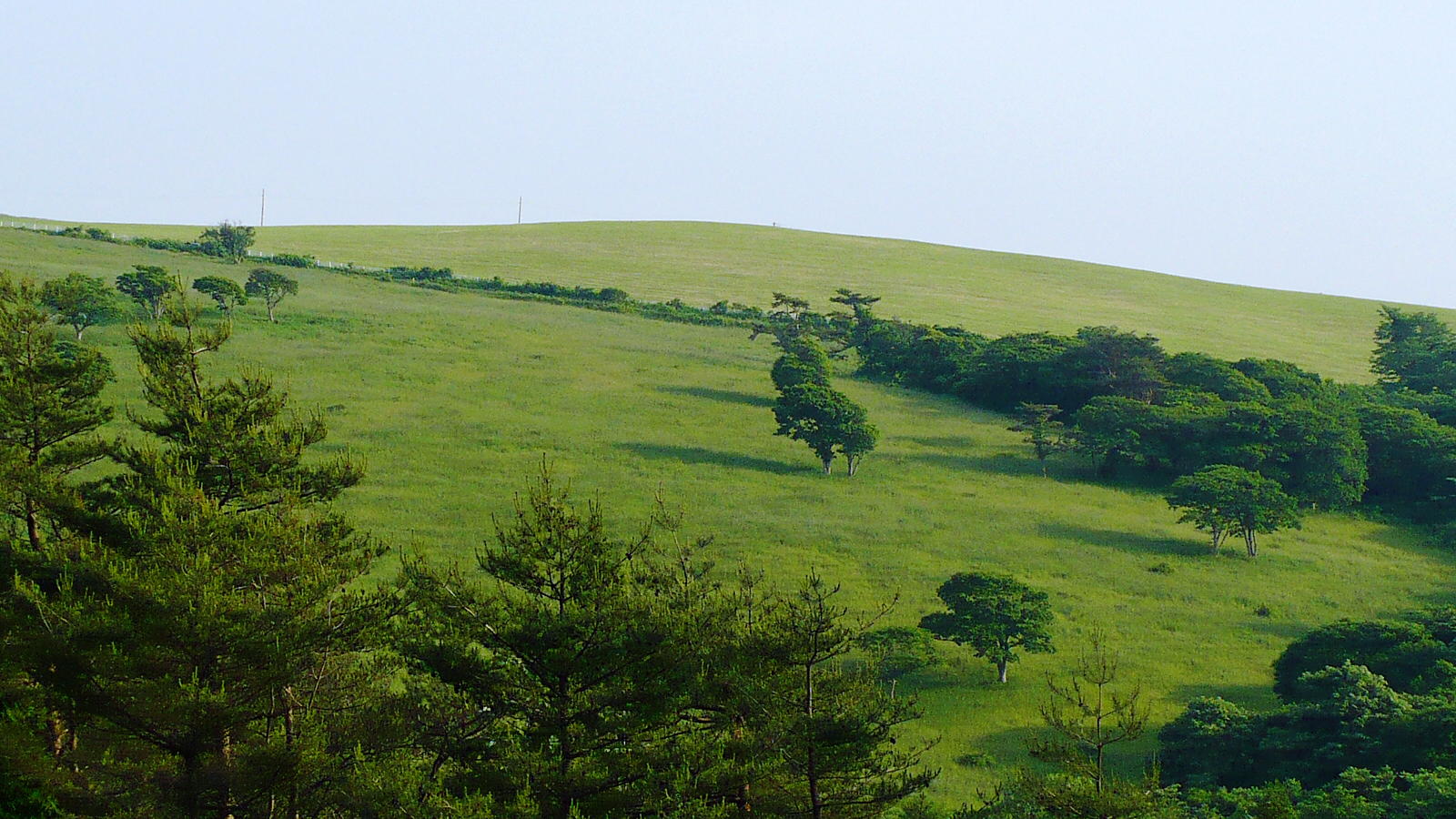
- Taneyama Plains
- Location: Iwate Prefecture, Japan
- Established: 2005
- National Palace of Scenic Beauty Scenic areas of Ihatov (Iwate Prefecture) Scenic areas of Ihatov (Japan)

The Scenic areas of Ihatov (イーハトーブの風景地, Īhatōbu no fūkeichi) is a cluster of landmarks in Iwate Prefecture, Japan connected with the writings of Meiji period author Kenji Miyazawa in Iwate Prefecture, Japan. These locations were collectively designated a Place of Scenic Beauty in 2005.

== Overview ==
Ihatov is a quasi-Esperanto name of a fictional land derived from the word "Iwate" as a toponym created by author Kenji Miyazawa. In the author's works Ihatov is a utopia which ranges from small islands in vast oceans and includes deserts and continents; however, it shares a number of things on common with Iwate, including a tendency towards natural disasters, and a resilient population.

The Place of Scenic Beauty designation spanned six locations in the municipalities of Hanamaki (Miyazawa's birthplace), Ōshū, Shizukuishi, Sumita, Hanamaki Tōno and Takizawa, to which a seventh location was added in 2006. Each of the locations appears in one or more of Miyazawa's poems.

1. Kurakakeyama or Mount Kurakake (鞍掛山), Takizawa
2. Nanatsumori or Nanatsu Forest (七つ森), Shizukuishi
3. Oi no Mori or Oi Forest (狼森), Shizukuishi
4. Kamabuchi no Taki or Kamabuchi Falls (釜淵の滝), Hanamaki
5. Gorin Tōge or Gorin Pass (五輪峠), Hanamaki, Tōno, Ōshū
6. Taneyamagahara or Taneyama Plains (種山ヶ原), Ōshū, Sumida
7. Igirisu Kaigan or England Coast (イギリス海岸), Hanamaki

== See also ==
- List of Places of Scenic Beauty of Japan (Iwate)
- Kenji Miyazawa
- Esperanto
