= Eugène Collache =

French Navy officer and samurai

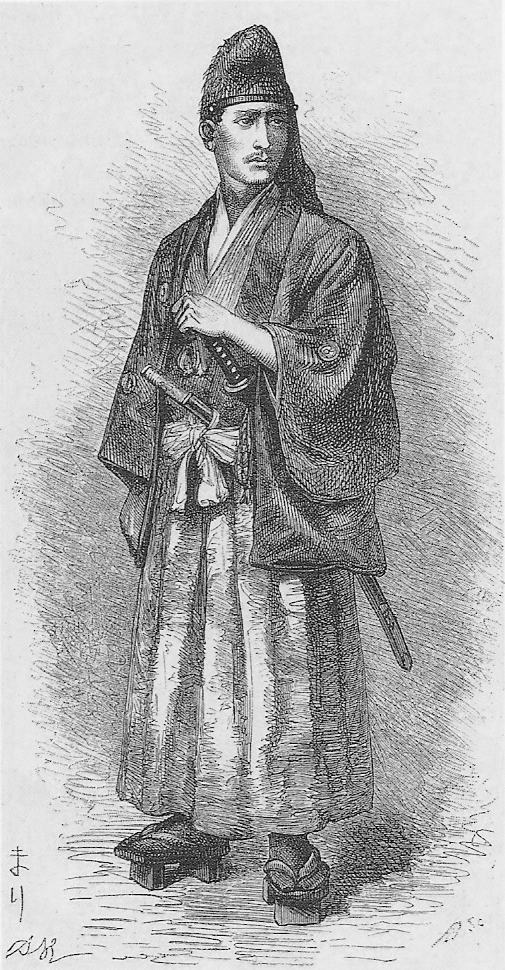
- Eugène Collache in samurai attire
- Born: 29 January 1847; Perpignan
- Died: 25 October 1883 (aged 36); 16e arrondissement de Paris
- Occupations: Adventurer; Navy officer
- Known for: the Boshin War

Eugène Collache (29 January 1847 in Perpignan – 25 October 1883 in Paris) was a French Navy officer who fought in Japan for the shōgun during the Boshin War.

== Arrival in Japan ==
Eugène Collache was an officer of the French Navy in the 19th century. Based on the ship Minerva of the French Oriental Fleet, he deserted when the ship was anchored at Yokohama harbour, with his friend Henri Nicol to rally other French officers, led by Jules Brunet, who had embraced the cause of the Bakufu in the Boshin War. On 29 November 1868, Eugène Collache and Nicol left Yokohama on board a commercial ship, the Sophie-Hélène, chartered by a Swiss businessman.

== The Boshin War ==
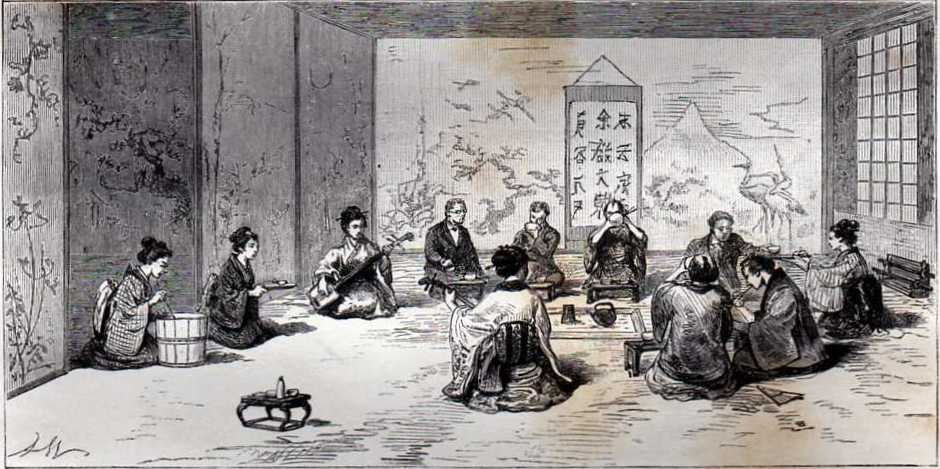
Reception of Eugène Collache by a minister of the Daimyo of Tsugaru

The two French officers first reached Samenoura Bay in the province of Nanbu (modern Miyagi Prefecture), where they learned that the Imperial forces had subdued the daimyōs of Northern Japan, and that the rebel forces favorable to the shōgun had fled to the island of Hokkaidō. They went further north to Aomori, where they were warmly received by the daimyō of Tsugaru. A visiting American ship brought them the news that an order of arrest had been issued against them. Eugène Collache and Nicol decided to board the American ship and reached Hokkaidō.

During the winter of 1868–1869, Collache was put in charge of establishing fortifications in the volcanic mountain chain protecting Hakodate (Nicol was put in charge of organizing the Navy).

On 18 May, the decision was taken to make a surprise attack on the Imperial Navy, which was moving north to confront them. Collache thus participated to the Naval Battle of Miyako. He was on the Takao, former Aschwelotte, which he was commanding. The two other ships were the Kaiten and the Banryū. The ships encountered bad weather, in which the Takao suffered from engine trouble, and the Banryū was separated. The Banryu eventually returned to Hokkaidō, without joining the battle.

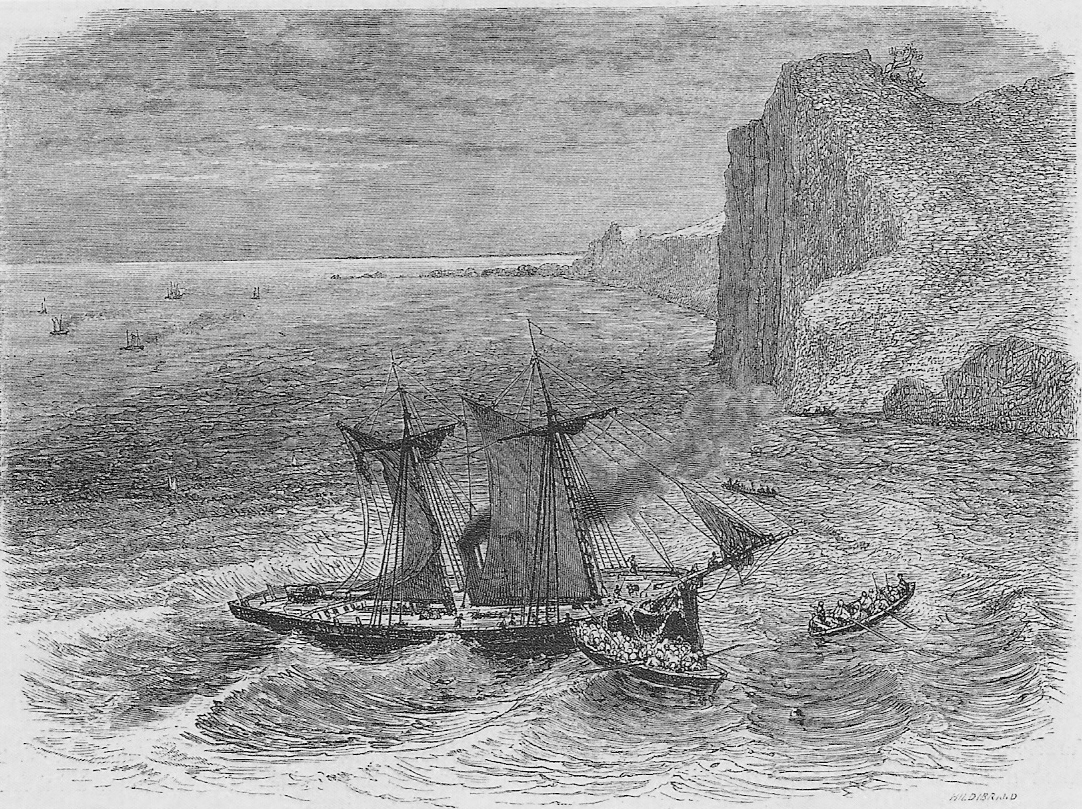
The Takao, pursued by steamships of the Imperial Navy

To create surprise, the Kaiten planned to enter Miyako harbour with an American flag. Unable to achieve more than three knots due to engine trouble, the Takao trailed behind, and the Kaiten first joined battle. The Kaiten approached the enemy ships and raised the Bakufu flag seconds before boarding the Imperial warship Kōtetsu. The Kōtetsu managed to repel the attack with a Gatling gun, with huge losses on the attacking side. The Kaiten, pursued by the Imperial fleet, steamed out of Miyako Bay just as the Takao was entering it. The Kaiten eventually escaped to Hokkaidō, but the Takao was unable to flee. Her crew set her on fire before escaping, and she blew up.

=== Capture and imprisonment ===
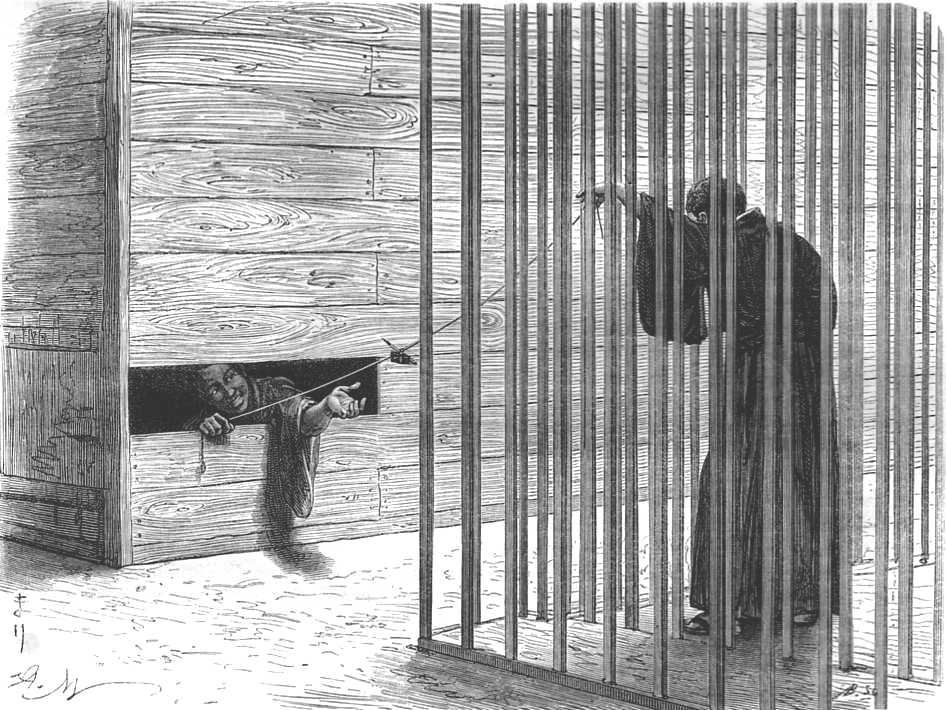
Collache in prison in Edo

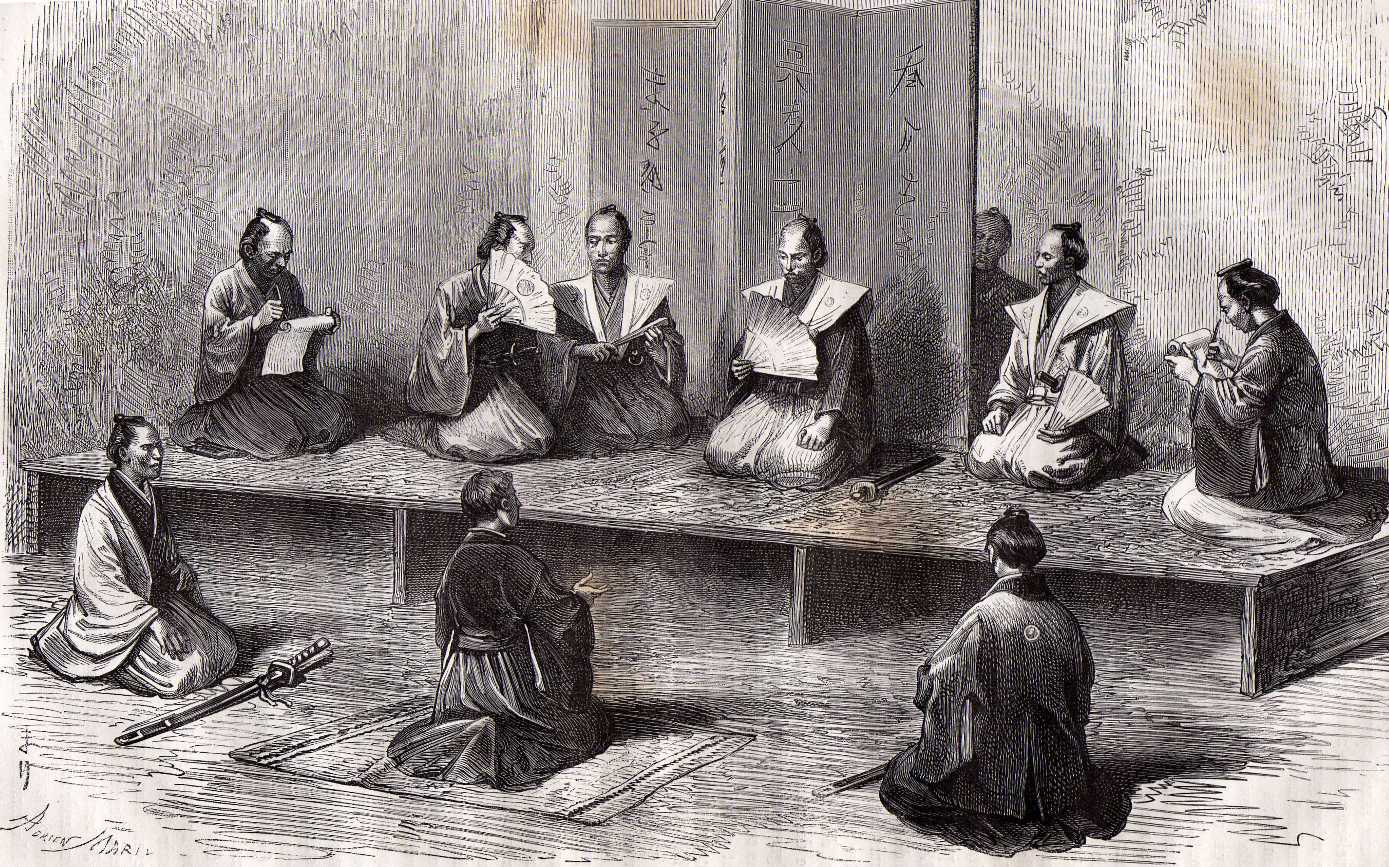
The trial of Eugène Collache in Edo

Trying to escape through the mountain, Collache finally surrendered after a few days together with his troops to the Japanese authorities. They were brought to Edo to be imprisoned. He was judged and condemned to death, but he was eventually pardoned.

He was transferred to Yokohama on board the French Navy frigate Coëtlogon, where he joined the remaining of the French rebel officers led by Jules Brunet.

== Return to France ==
Back in France, he was discharged from the armed forces and court-martialed as a deserter, but the sentence was light, and he was allowed to reenlist for the Franco-Prussian War together with his friend Nicol.

=== Books ===
Collache wrote "An Adventure in Japan 1868–1869" ("Une aventure au Japon 1868–1869"), which was published in 1874.

== See also ==
- Jules Brunet (1838–1911) – was a French officer who fought for the shōgun in the Boshin War and later became a General and Chief of Staff of the French Minister of War in 1898.
- John Henry Schnell – known in Japanese as Hiramatsu Buhei was a Prussian arms dealer, who served the Aizu domain as a military instructor and procurer of weapons.
- French military mission to Japan (1867–1868)
- Franco-Japanese relations
