= Clateau =

Clateau was a French non-commissioned officer of the 19th century, a quarter-master and a cannonry specialist.

With the advent of the Boshin War, and the declaration of neutrality of foreign powers, Clateau chose to resign from the French Army and continue the fight on the side of the Bakufu.

He participated to the Naval Battle of Miyako, in which he was in charge of the cannonry on board the steam warship Banryū.

After the conflict, Clateau set up a Hotel-Restaurant in the area of Tsukiji in Tokyo, and a second one in Yokohama.
