= Geibikei =

- IUCN category III (natural monument or feature)
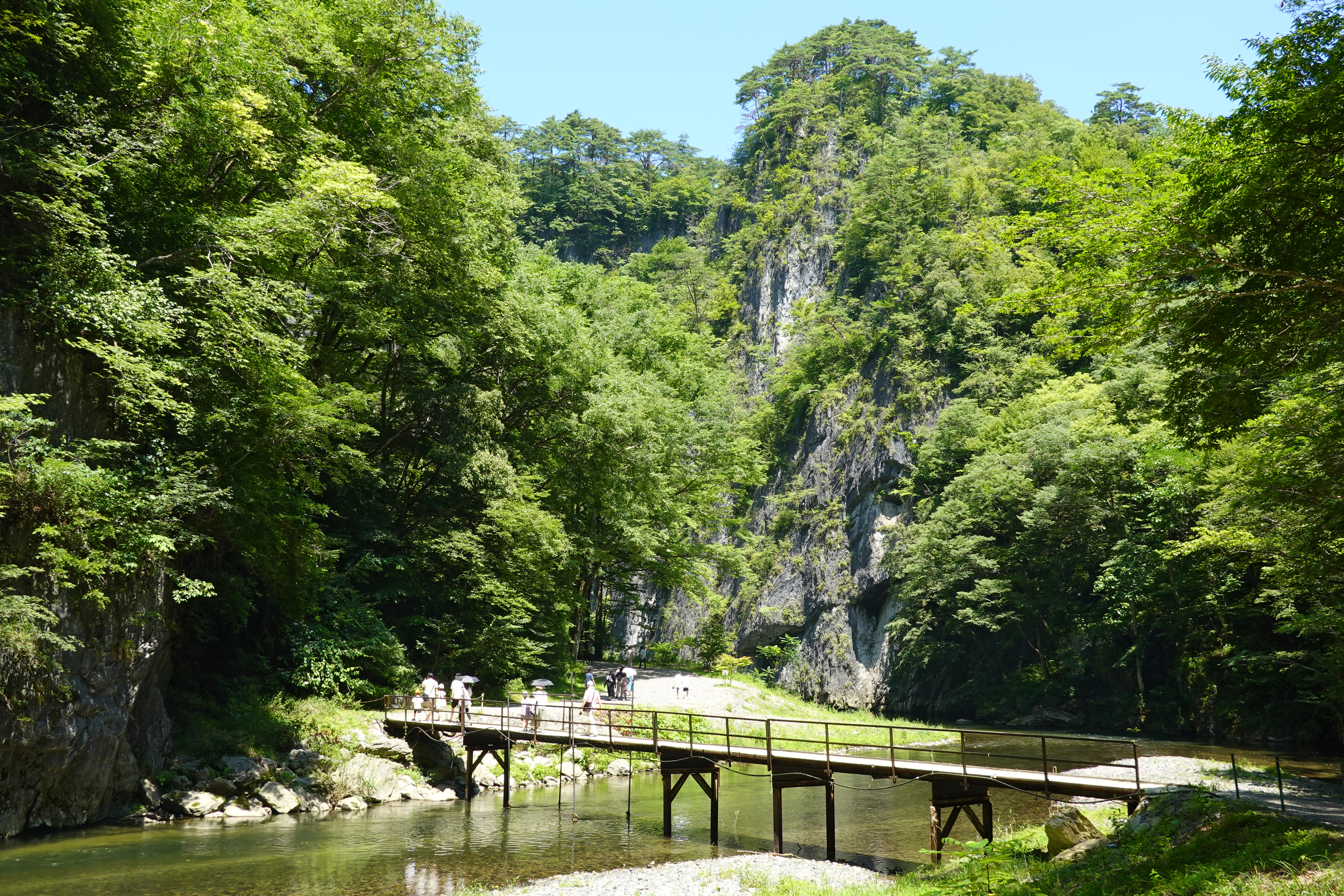
- typical panorama at Geibikei

- Location within Iwate Prefecture Location within Japan
- Location: Ichinoseki, Iwate Prefecture, Japan
- Coordinates: 38°59′24″N 141°15′4″E
- Length: 2 km (1.2 mi)
- National Palace of Scenic Beauty Natural Monument

Geibikei (猊鼻渓) is a ravine on the Satetsu River in the city of Ichinoseki, Iwate Prefecture, Japan. It has been designated a National Place of Scenic Beauty and Natural Monument since 1923. In 1927 it was also selected as one of the 100 Landscapes of Japan.

== Overview ==
Geibikei is located in southern Iwate Prefecture, and is a series of cliffs stretching for approximately two kilometers. The gorge was formed by the Satetsu River eroding the Paleozoic limestone strata found in the Southern Kitakami Mountains. The river is surrounded by soaring cliffs of over 50 meters in height, and peaking at 124 meters, with fanciful rock formations created by erosion and numerous waterfalls. The name “Geibi”, which means “lion nose”, comes from a limestone formation near the end of the ravine which resembles a lion's snout. Unlike the Genbikei ravine, which is also located in Ichinoseki, the Geibikei is wide enough to permit use of small boats, and thus the ravine is noted for its 90-minute boat trip up and back down the river pushed along with a pole by boatmen, who sing on the return leg of the journey.

Before the Meiji period, the ravine was unknown, and the surrounding area was regarded as a near-wilderness. It was popularized by two local politicians, who invited numerous literary and political figures, including members of the aristocracy to visit the area.

Geibikei is a short walk from Geibikei Station on the JR East Ofunato Line.

== Gallery ==
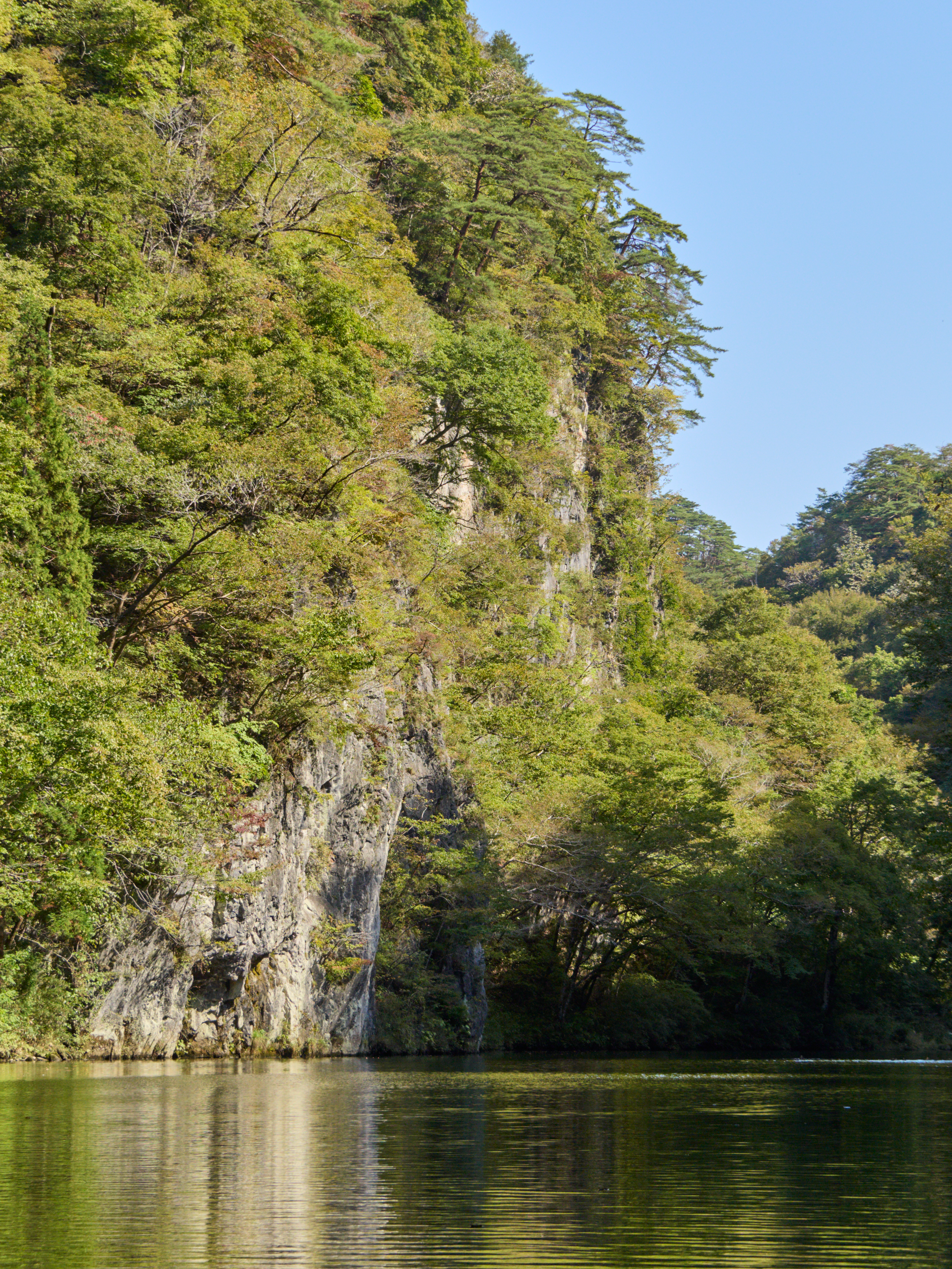

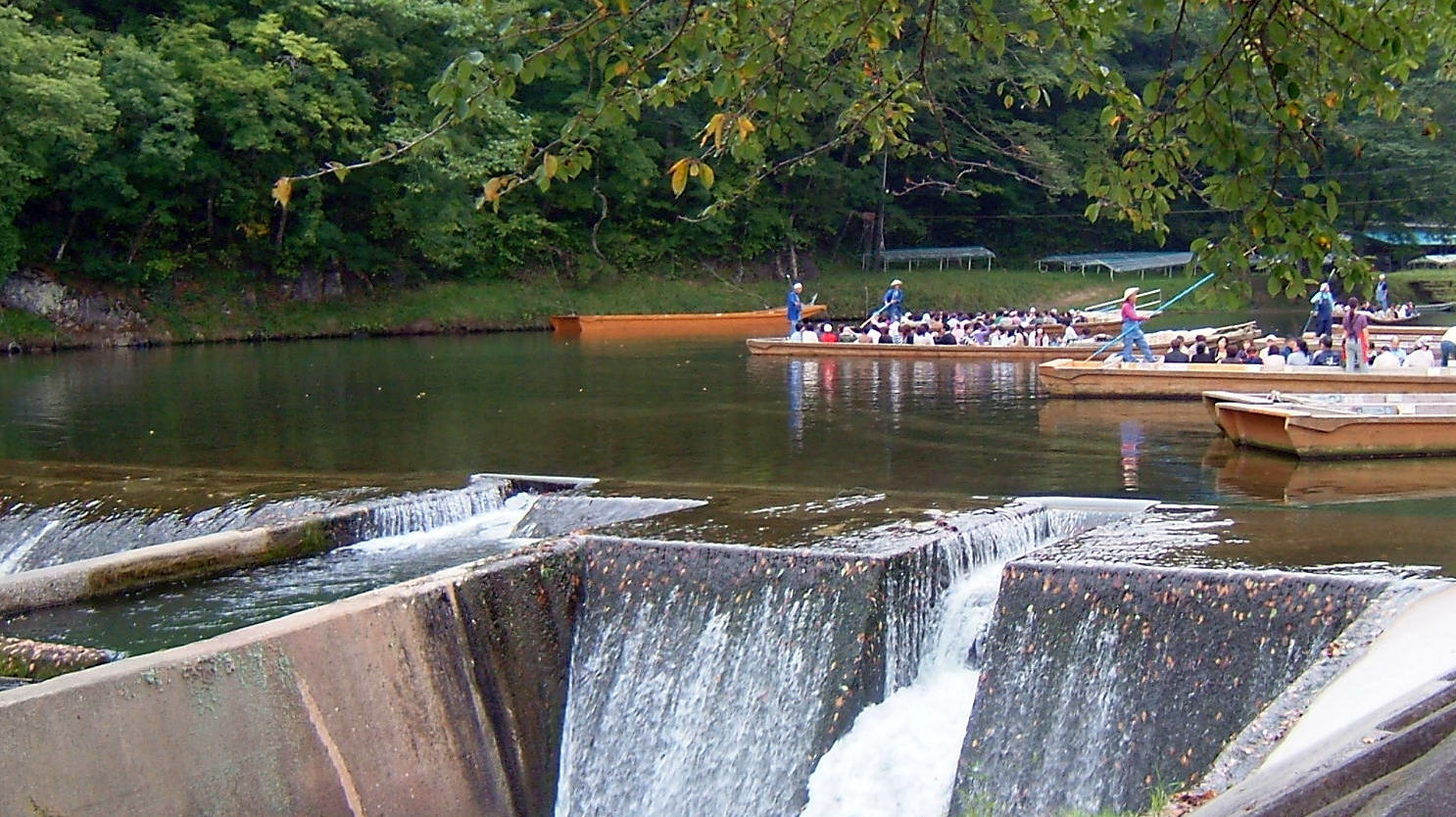
Geibikei boat dock

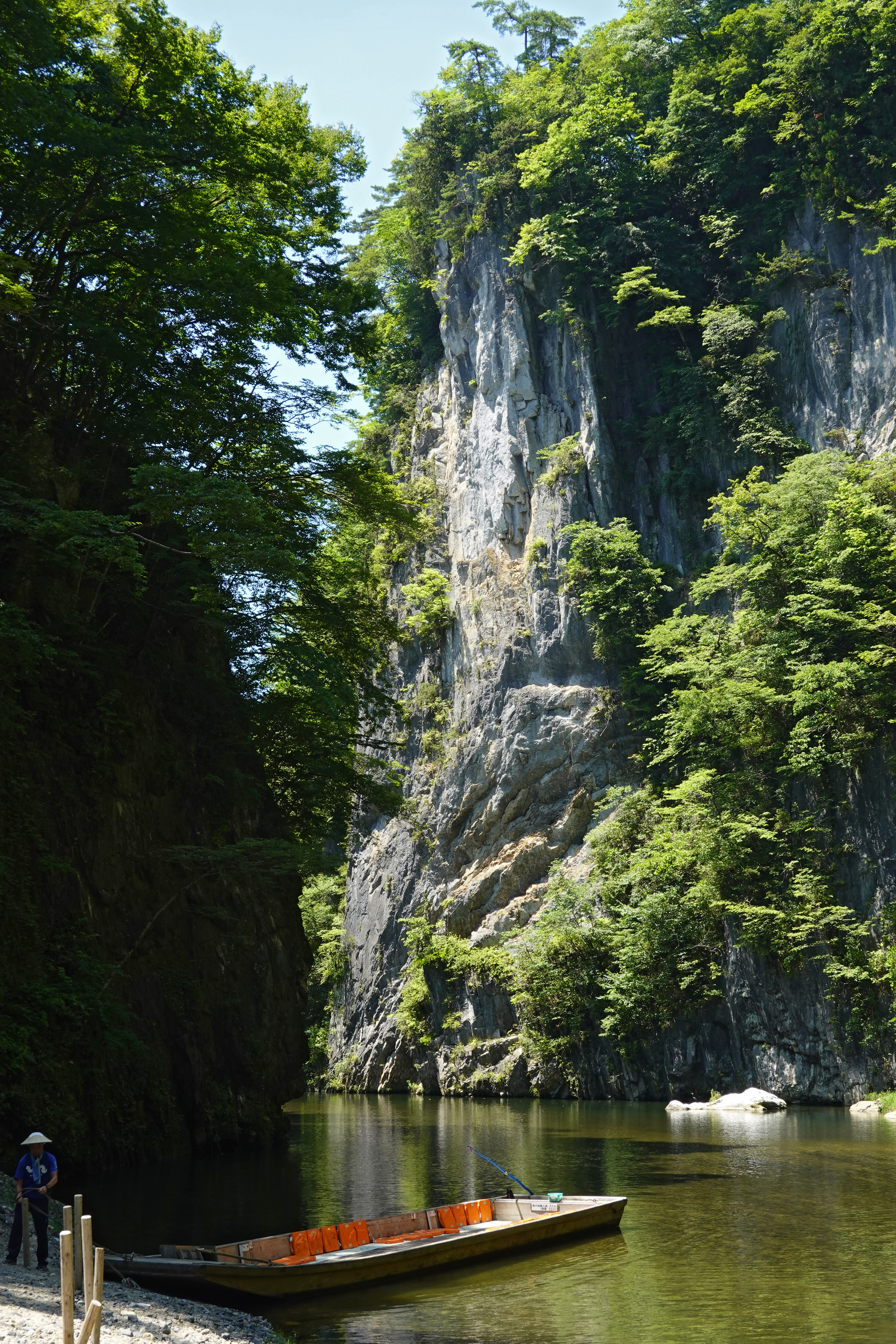
Panorama

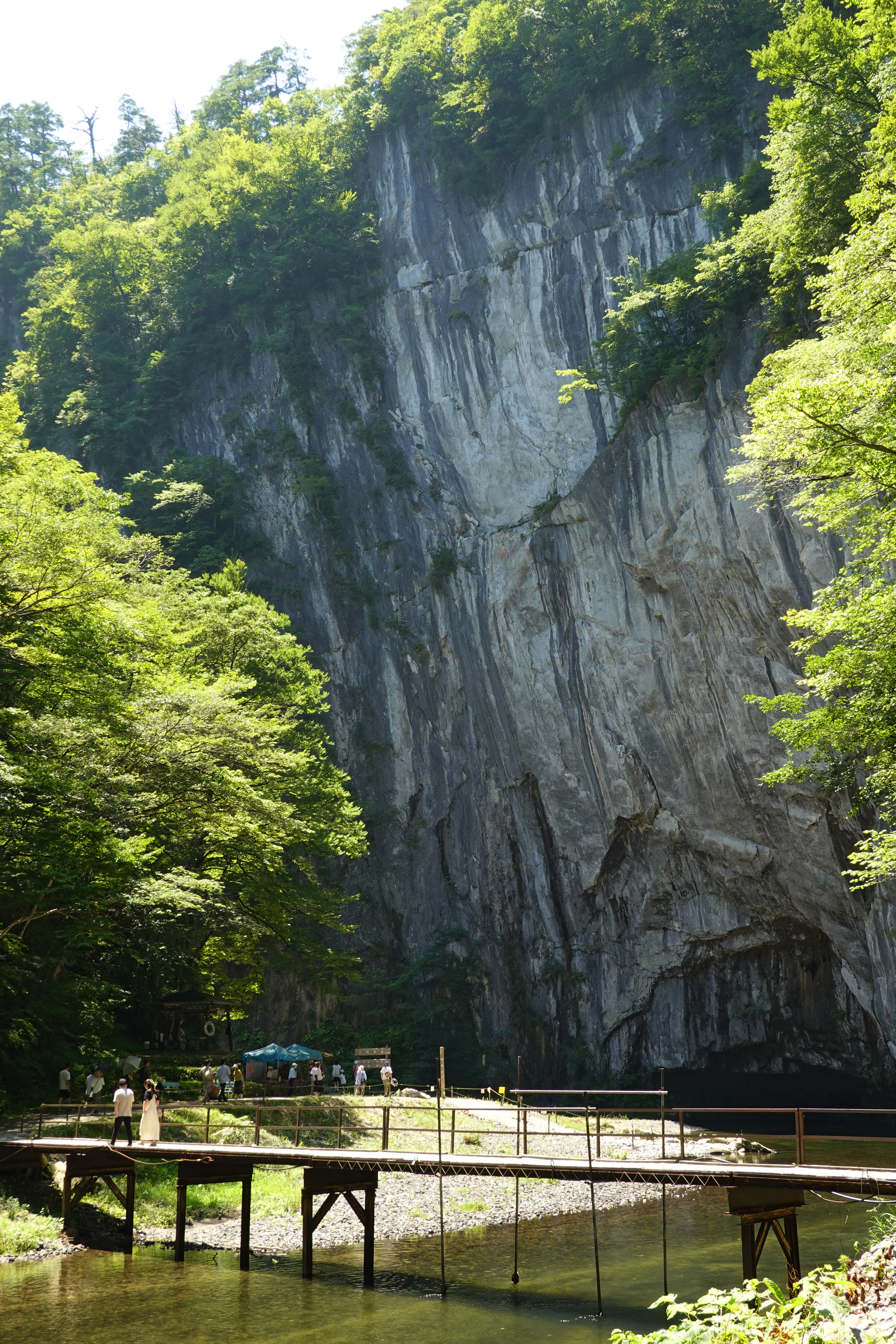
Panorama

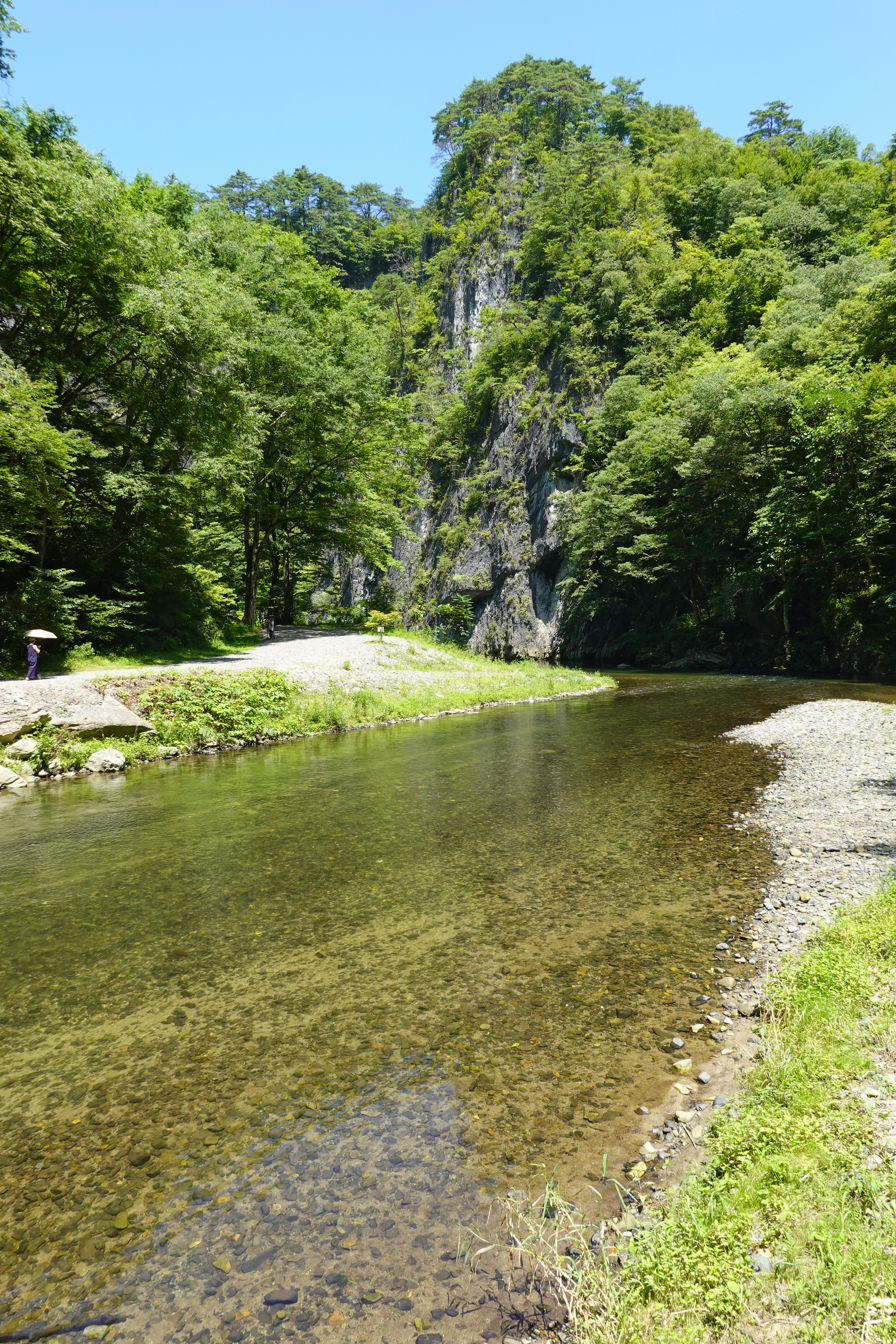
Panorama

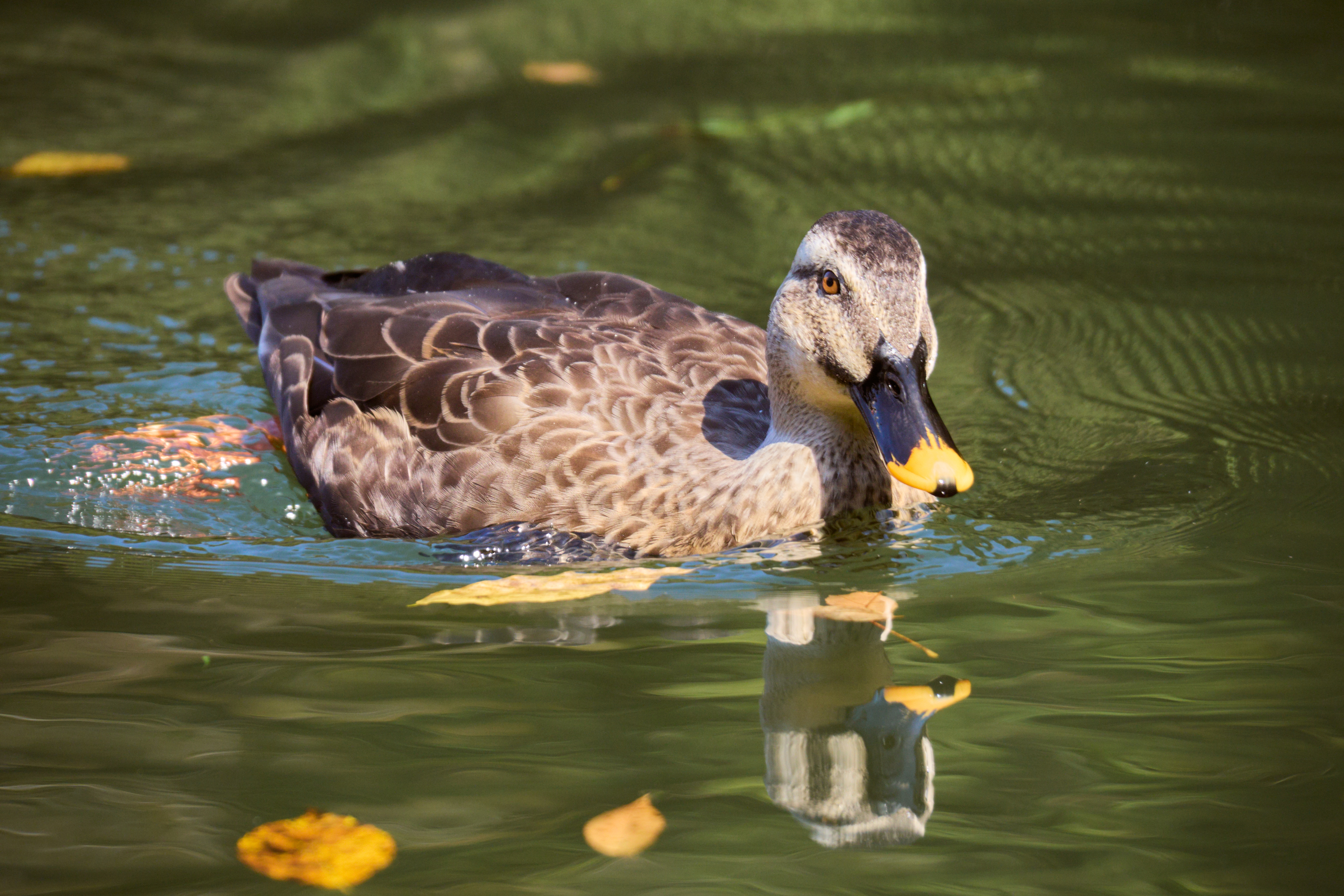
A spot-billed duck

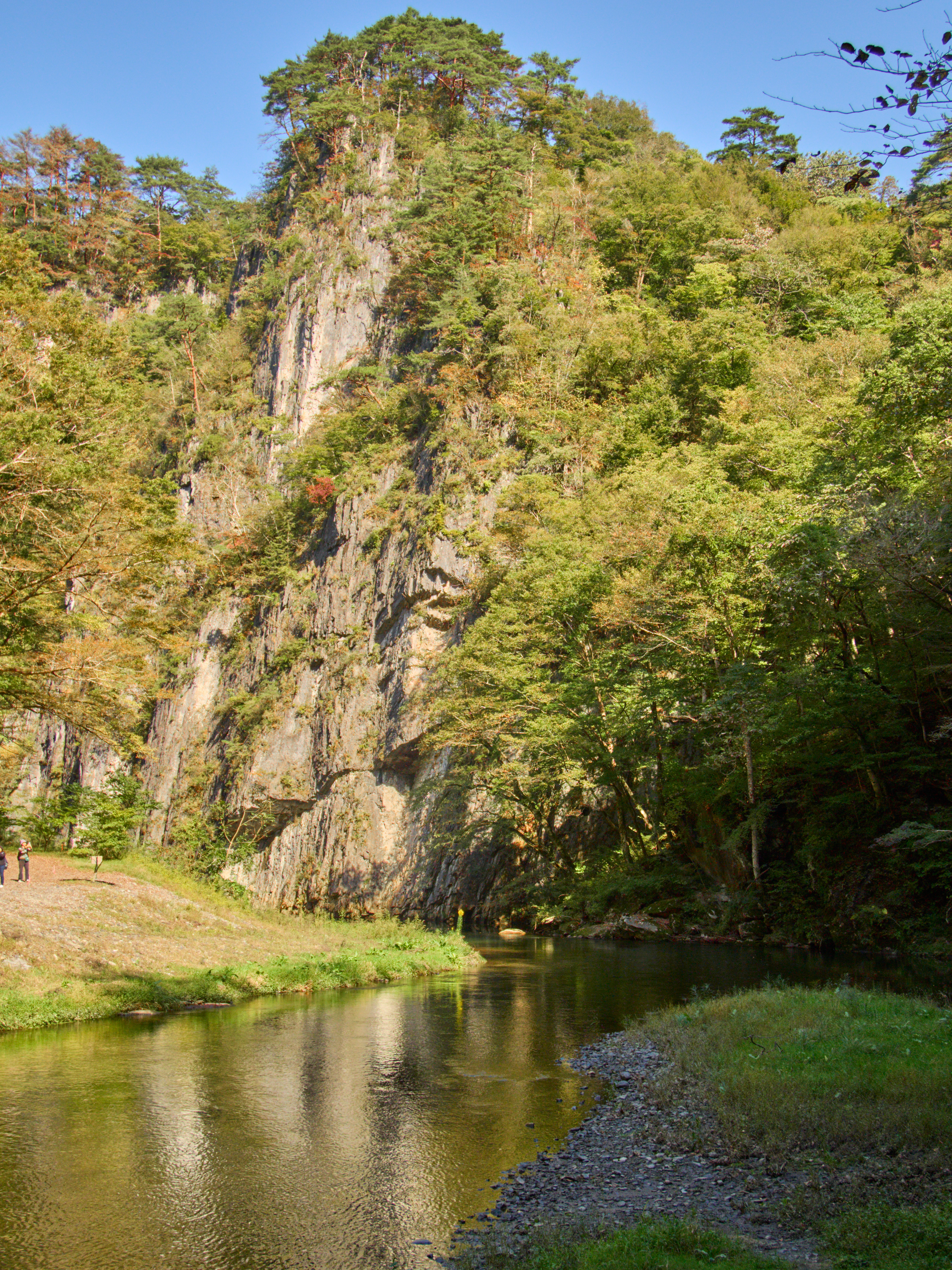

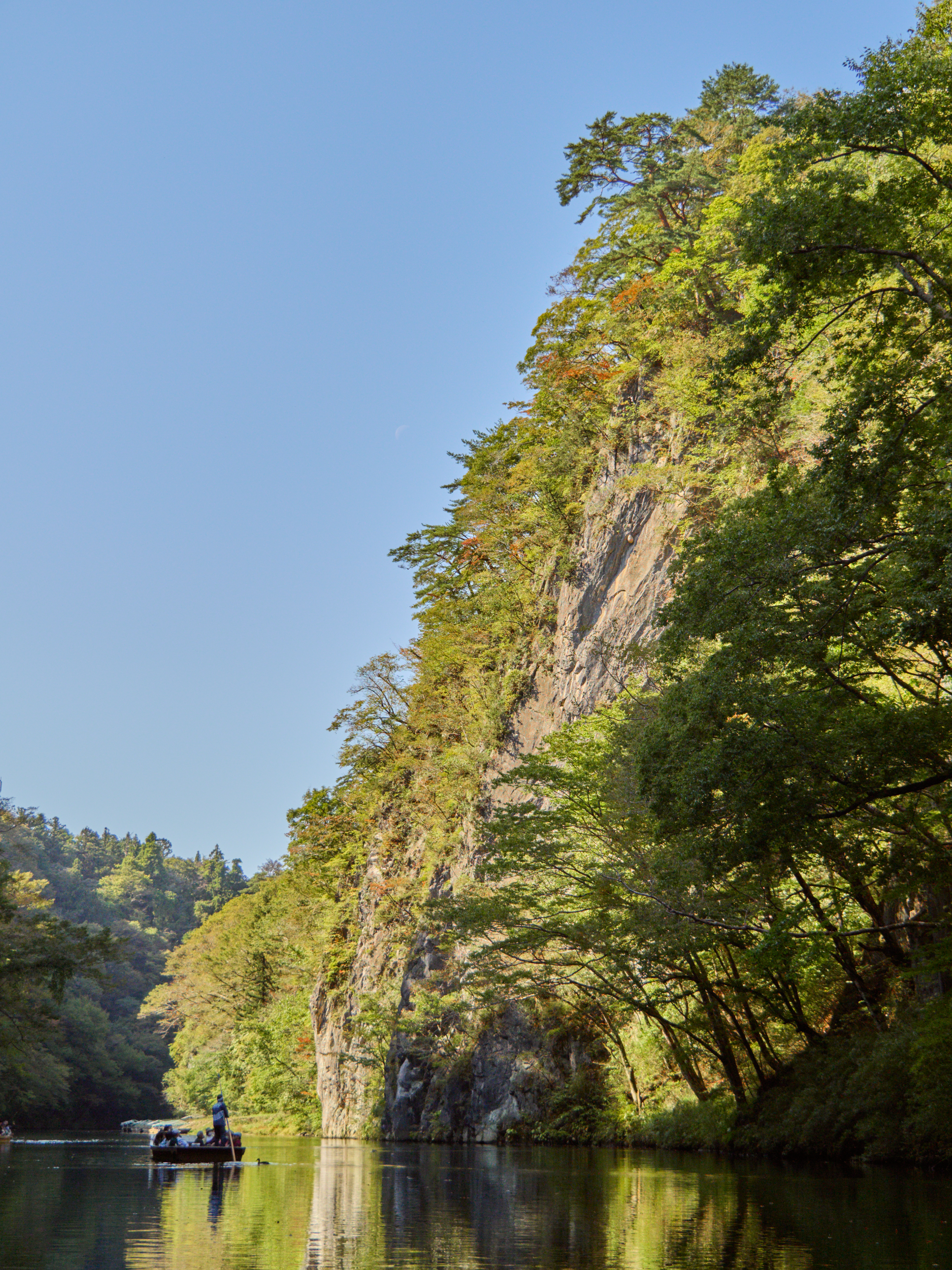

== See also ==
- List of Places of Scenic Beauty of Japan (Iwate)
- Genbikei
- Kurikoma Quasi-National Park
