= Sangojima =

Uninhabited island in Japan

Native name: 珊琥島
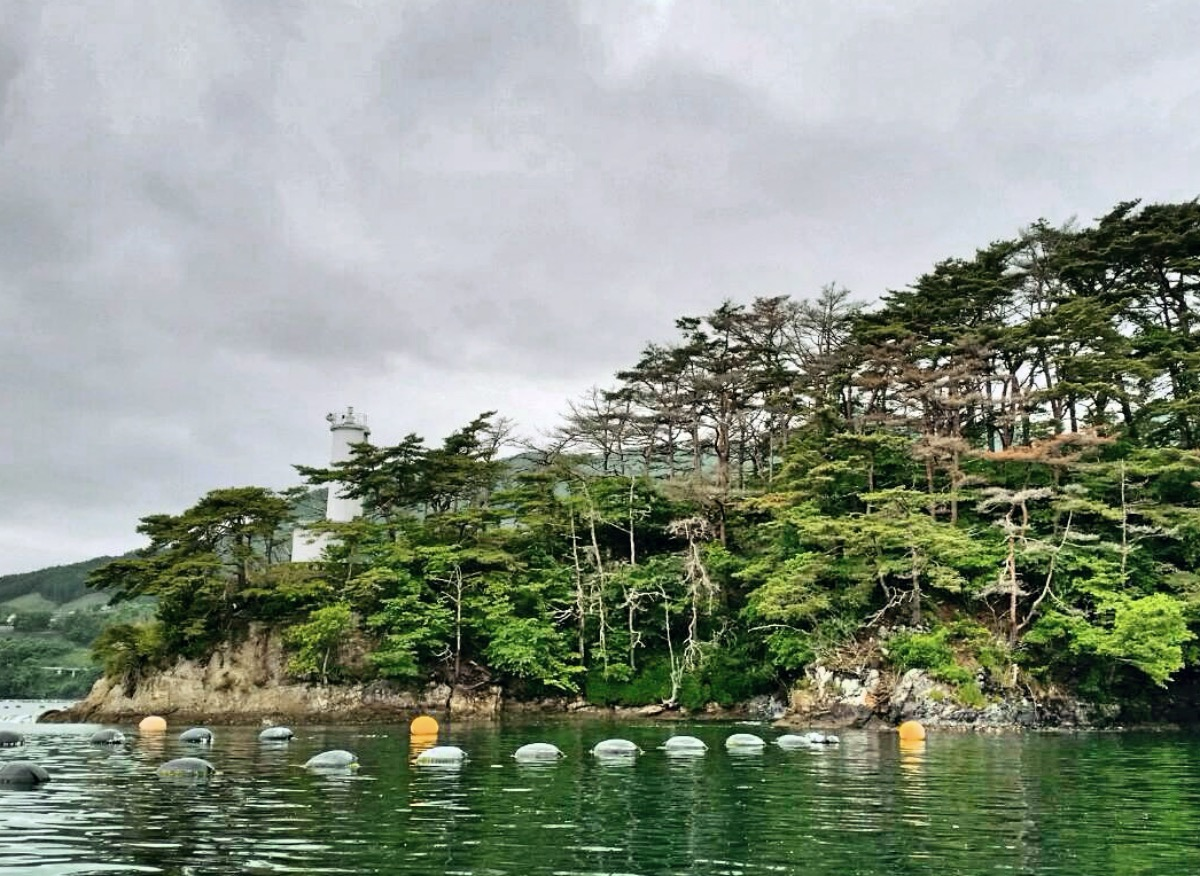

- Sangojima Sangojima (Japan)

Geography
- Location: Pacific Ocean
- Coordinates: 39°02′13″N 141°43′38″E
- Area: 0.02 km^{2} (0.0077 sq mi)
- Coastline: 0.9 km (0.56 mi)
- Highest elevation: 25 m (82 ft)

Administration
- Japan
- Prefecture: Iwate
- City: Ōfunato

Demographics
- Population: 0

Sangojima (珊琥島) in an uninhabited islet located in the center of Ōfunato Bay, on the Sanriku Coast of Japan. It has been designated a National Place of Scenic Beauty and Natural Monument since 1946.

== Overview ==
The islet, which has a land area of 0.02 square kilometres (4.9 acres), a circumference of 0.9 km and a height of 25 meters, is located within the municipality of Ōfunato, Iwate Prefecture. It is covered in a dense forest of maple and Japanese red pine, such that in autumn the red leaves and red tree trunks give the island the appearance of being made of red coral. It was designated as a national scenic spot for its beautiful scenery.

The island was owned by Shibuya Kasuke, a local businessman who made his fortune importing gunpowder and munitions during the Meiji period. It was donated to Ōfunato village during the Taishō period for use as a public park. The island suffered from damage caused by tsunami in the 1933 Sanriku earthquake and the 1960 Valdivia earthquake, and in the 2011 Tōhoku earthquake and tsunami.

== See also ==
- List of Places of Scenic Beauty of Japan (Iwate)
