= Edward and Henry Schnell =

Dutch-German businessmen (1830-1911)

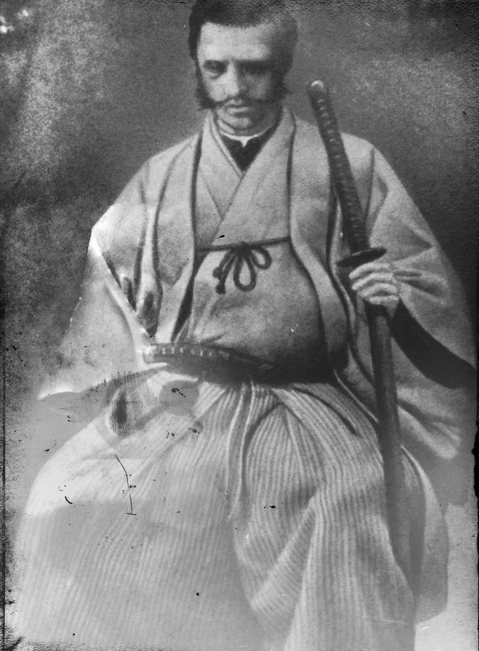
- John Henry Schnell with his swords
- Born: 3 June 1830
- Died: 22 August 1911 (aged 81)

Edward Schnell (3 June 1830–22 August 1911) and John Henry Schnell (Japanese: 平松 武兵衛, Hiramatsu Buhē, 4 August 1834–15 October 1917) were brothers of Dutch extraction and German arms dealers active in Japan. After the enforced opening of Yokohama to foreign trade, Edward, who in the 1850s had served in the Prussian Army and spoke Malay, must have arrived in Japan no later than 1862. He is also listed as owner of plot "No. 44" in Yokohama. He teamed up with the Swiss watch dealer François Perregaux presumably until 1867. Henry served as secretary and translator to the Prussian consul Max von Brandt. While travelling in an open coach through Edo (modern Tokyo) in September 1867 the brothers were attacked by a samurai from Numata, who, by drawing his sword, in a private vendetta was trying to enforce the Sonnō jōi policy. The attacker was shot in the chest but managed to escape. While wildly shooting around the Schnells injured an innocent passer-by. The Japanese bodyguards provided by the Bakufu remained inactive. Von Brandt demanded that the attacker be executed, something the gaikoku-bugyō would not consent to. After much diplomatic wrangling the Prussian consul, realising that he had not the necessary military means, backed up and left it to the appropriate authorities of the samurai's Han to decide an appropriate punishment.

== Document reliability ==
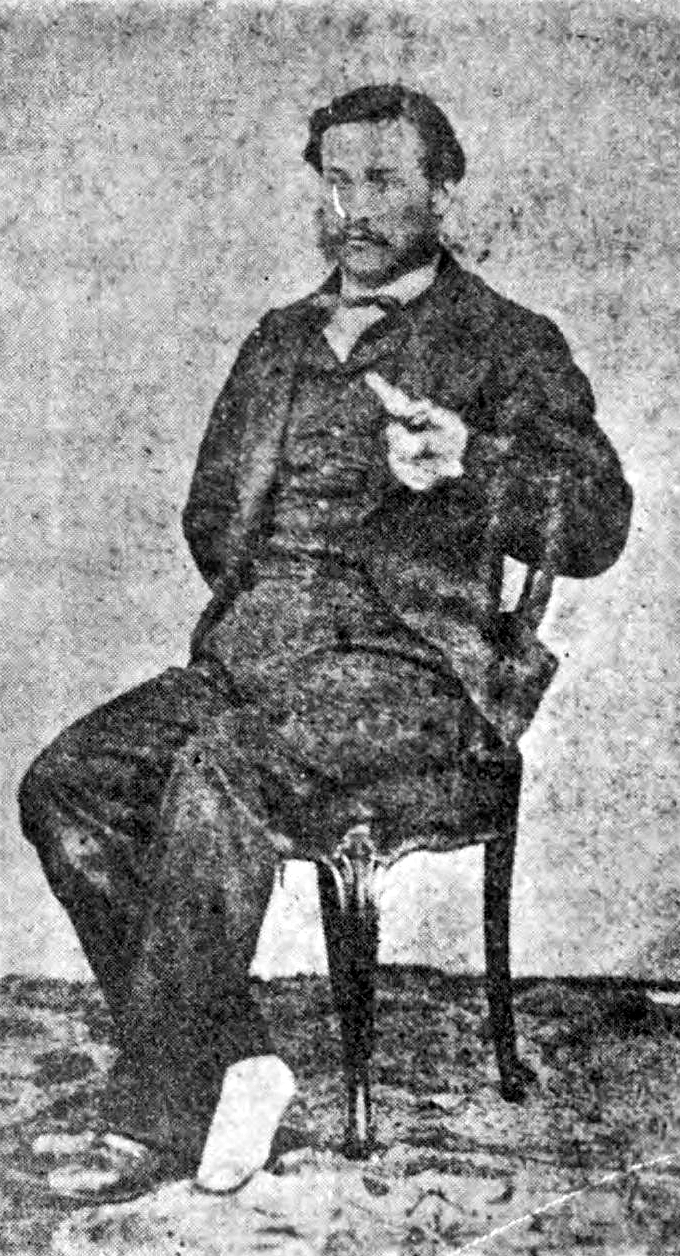
Edward Schnell

There are very few documents regarding the two brothers. Even the dates and places of their birth and death are unknown. They were from the Kingdom of Prussia, and raised in the Dutch East Indies (present day Indonesia). There is inconsistency also in Henry's name, varying from Henry Schnell, John Henry Schnell, I. Henry Schnell, and C. H. Schnell. Sometimes the two brothers are mistaken as the same person.

== Boshin War ==
During the Boshin War in 1868–1869 Henry is known to have counselled the daimyō of Nagaoka, in Niigata, to whom he sold two Gatling guns (only one other existed in Japan at the time), 2,000 French rifles, and various other armaments. Troops seized Edward's storehouse in Niigata in 1869, and in a compromise brokered by the Dutch consul he received $40000 compensation in 1873. Apparently he lost most of his invested money in Germany during the economic crises of the late 1870s.

== Aizu-Han ==
Edward and Henry Schnell also served the Aizu domain as a military instructor and procurer of weapons. Henry was granted the Japanese name Hiramatsu Buhei (平松武兵衛), which inverted the characters of the daimyō's name Matsudaira (松平). Hiramatsu (I. H. Schnell) was given the right to wear swords, as well as a residence in the castle town of Wakamatsu, a Japanese wife (the daughter of a Shōnai-han retainer), and retainers. In many contemporary references, he is portrayed as wearing a Japanese kimono, overcoat, and swords, with Western riding trousers and boots.

== California ==
After Aizu's defeat, Henry, his Japanese wife and about two dozen disgruntled samurai established a 600-acre settlement in California. The Wakamatsu Silk and Tea Farm in what is nowadays El Dorado County was not economically viable, mainly because the samurai lacked the necessary skills (also social) to work the land. After two years Henry Schnell with his wife and daughter disappeared without further trace. Since 1969 this first Japanese settlement in the US has been marked by a commemorative plaque. In November 2010 the site was purchased by a land preservation society who plan to construct a museum. Kawashima Chūnosuke reported having met Edward in Geneva in 1885.

== Depictions in media ==
The Boshin War and some of Henry's activities in Japan were dramatized in a 2015 TV movie, Samurai Warrior Queens.

== See also ==
- Eugène Collache
- List of Westerners who visited Japan before 1868
