= Miyako Bay =

Bay in Iwate Prefecture, Japan

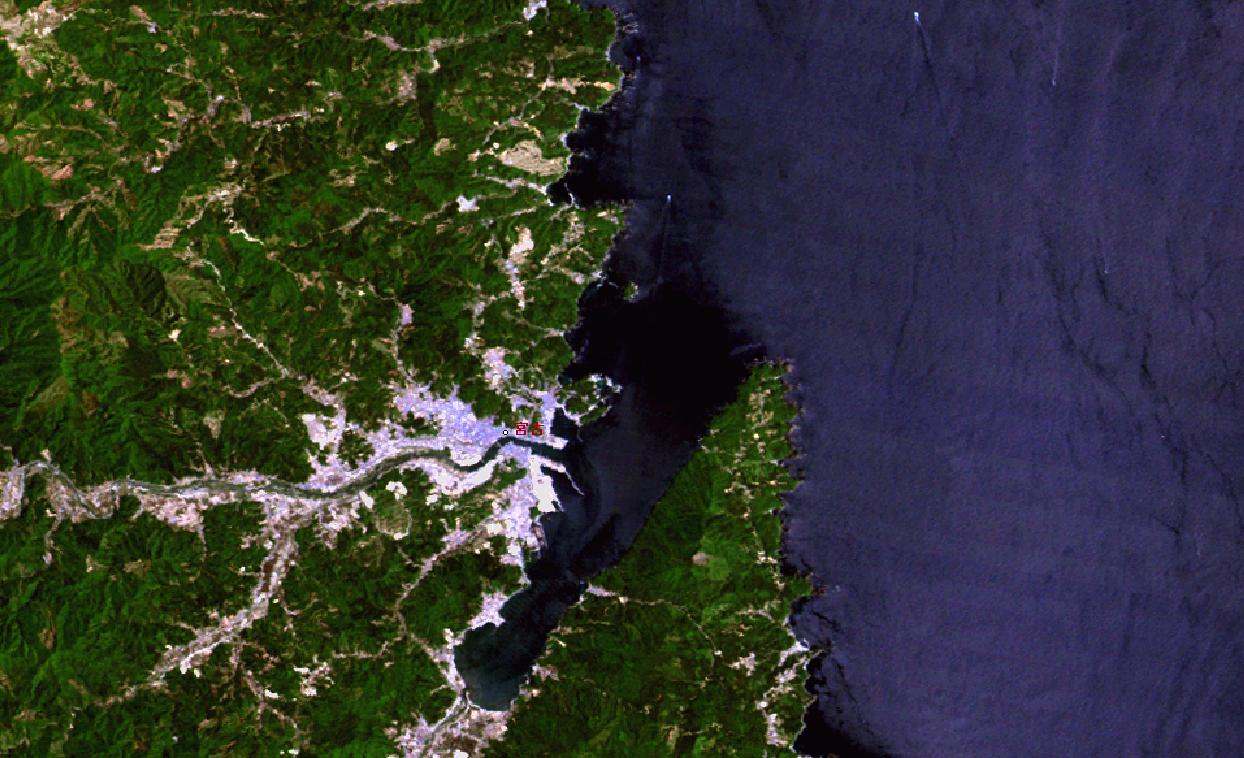
- Miyako Bay

- Location within Japan
- Location: Iwate Prefecture, Japan
- Coordinates: 39°36′N 141°58′E
- Ocean/sea sources: Pacific Ocean
- Basin countries: Japan
- Max. length: 10 km (6.21 mi)
- Max. width: 4.8 km (2.98 mi)
- Surface area: 24 km^{2} (9.3 mi^{2})
- Average depth: 76 m (249 ft)
- Settlements: Miyako, Mutsu

Miyako Bay (宮古湾, Miyako-wan) is a bay in Iwate Prefecture, in the northern Tōhoku region of northern Japan. It is a long and narrow, roughly triangular body of water extending southwest to northeast where it opens to the Pacific Ocean. The Omoe Peninsula (重茂半島, Omoe-hantō) forms its eastern border and Cape Anegasaki (姉ヶ崎, Anegasaki) forms its southern border. This gives it an area of approximately 24 km^{2} (9.3 mi^{2}).

Miyako Bay is approximately 10 km (6.21 mi) long, with a width of 4.8 km (2.98 mi) at its mouth. The bay has an average depth of 20-40 meters, with a maximum depth of 76 m (249 ft).

Economically, the shallow waters of the bay are an important fishery, with shellfish and seaweed cultivation and aquaculture benefiting from nutrients brought into the almost enclosed waters of the bay by the Hei River and the effects of the offshore Kuroshio and Oyashio currents. Tourism is also economically important, as parts of the bay are within the borders of the Sanriku Fukkō National Park, including the scenic Jōdogahama coastline.

The Port of Miyako serves as the main seaport for the city of Morioka.

== Gallery ==
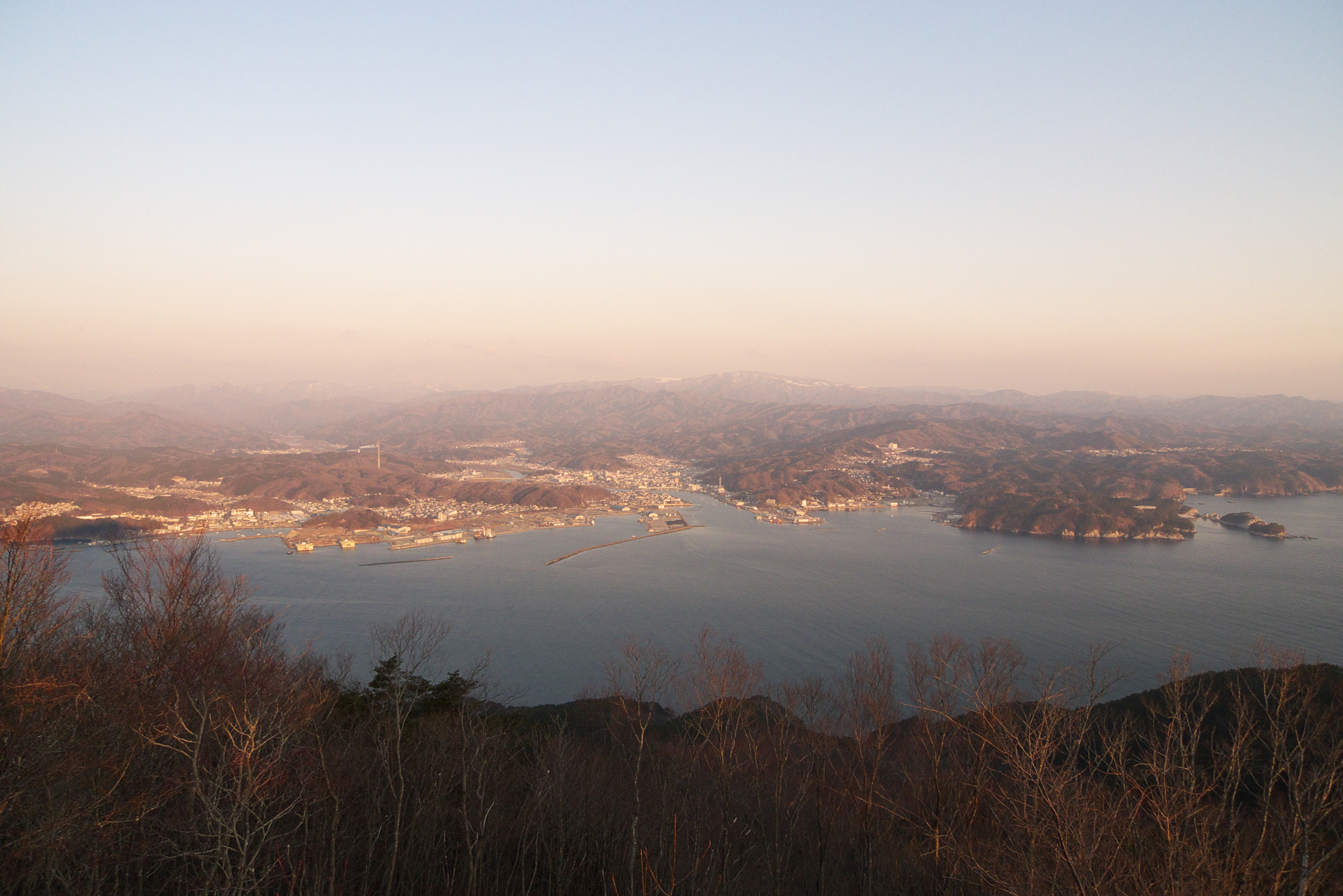
Miyako Bay, Jōdogahama and central Miyako City from Gassan

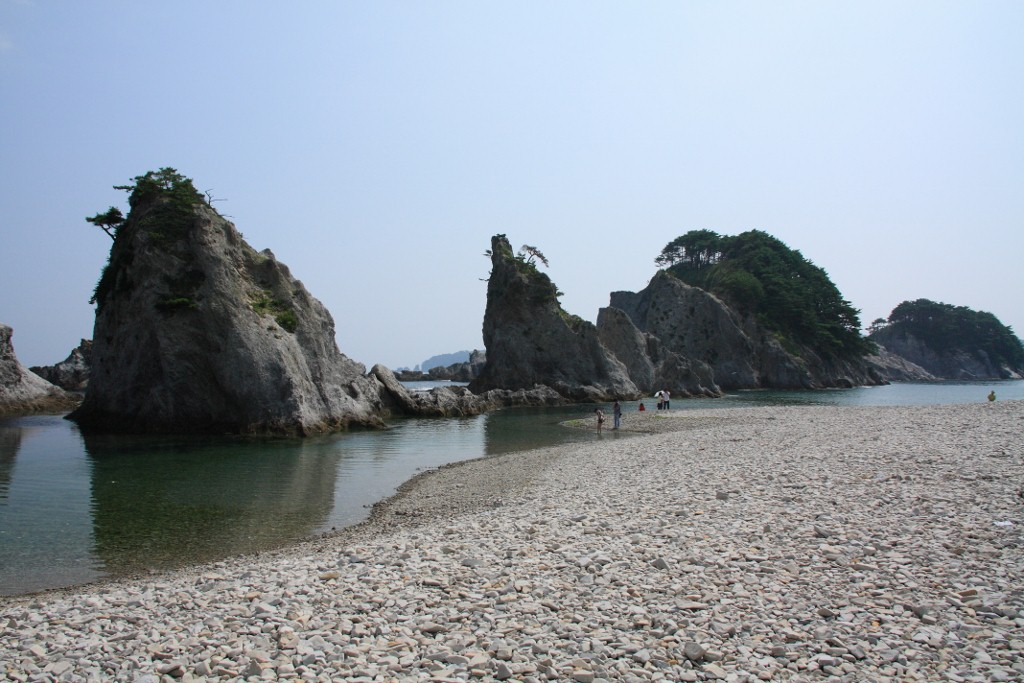
Jōdogahama

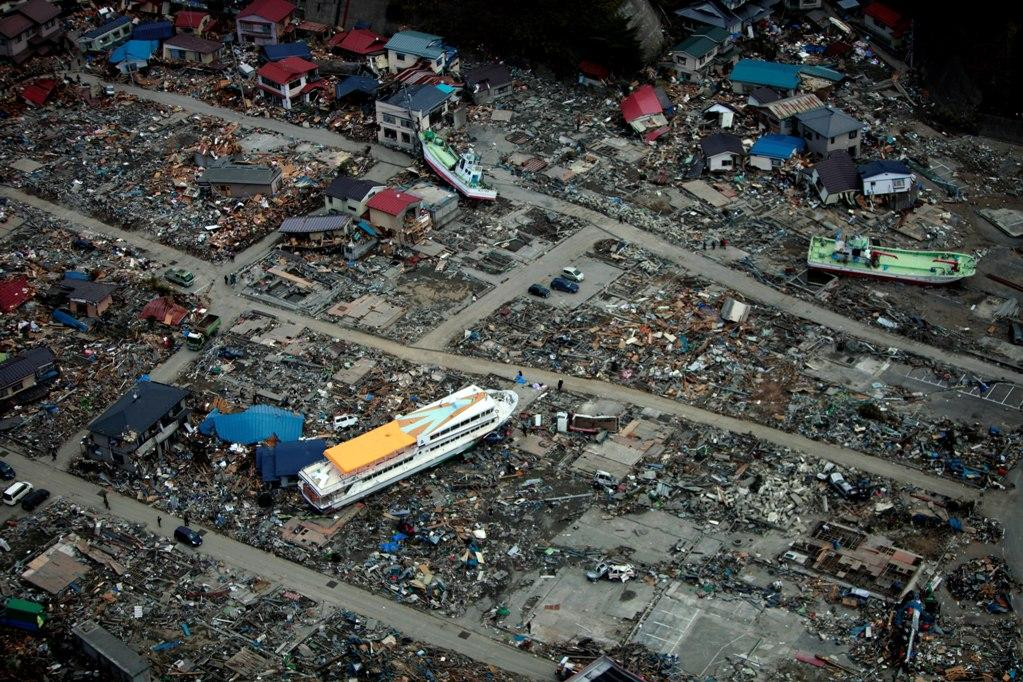
A large ferry boat rests inland amidst destroyed houses after a 9.0 earthquake and subsequent tsunami struck Japan March
