= Bouvet =

Bouvet can have the following meanings:

== Places ==
- Bouvet Island, an uninhabited Norwegian island in the South Atlantic

== People ==
Bouvet is a French surname. Notable people with the surname include:

- Albert Bouvet (1930–2017), French professional cyclist
- Charles Bouvet (1918–2005), French pole vaulter
- Didier Bouvet (born 1961), French former alpine skier
- Fanny Bouvet (born 1994), French diver
- Félix Bouvet (born 1991), French canoeist
- François Joseph Bouvet (1753–1832), French admiral
- Gustave Bouvet (1898–1984), French anarchist and attempted assassin
- Jean-Baptiste Charles Bouvet de Lozier (1705–1786), French explorer, discovered Bouvet Island
- Jean-Christophe Bouvet (born 1947), French actor, director, screenwriter
- Joachim Bouvet (1656–1730), French Jesuit who worked in China, leading member of the Figurist movement
- Laurent Bouvet (1968–2021), French political scientist
- Maurin Bouvet (born 1995), French ice hockey player
- Max Bouvet (1854–1943), French operatic baritone
- Michel Bouvet (born 1955), French designer and poster artist
- Pierre François Étienne Bouvet de Maisonneuve (1775–1860), French Navy officer and privateer
- Pierre Servan René Bouvet de Maisonneuve (1750–1795), French Navy officer, officer in Suffren's squadron during the War of American Independence
- René Joseph Bouvet de Précourt (1715–1782), French Navy officer, captain of Ajax in Suffren's squadron during the War of American Independence
- Sofian Bouvet (born 1989), French competitive sailor

== Organizations ==
- Bouvet ASA, Norwegian software services company

== Warships ==
- French ship Bouvet, five ships named in honour of François Joseph Bouvet
