= 1828 =

1828 in various calendars
- Gregorian calendar: 1828; MDCCCXXVIII
- Ab urbe condita: 2581
- Armenian calendar: 1277; ԹՎ ՌՄՀԷ
- Assyrian calendar: 6578
- Balinese saka calendar: 1749–1750
- Bengali calendar: 1234–1235
- Berber calendar: 2778
- British Regnal year: 8 Geo. 4 – 9 Geo. 4
- Buddhist calendar: 2372
- Burmese calendar: 1190
- Byzantine calendar: 7336–7337
- Chinese calendar: 丁亥年 (Fire Pig); 4525 or 4318 — to — 戊子年 (Earth Rat); 4526 or 4319
- Coptic calendar: 1544–1545
- Discordian calendar: 2994
- Ethiopian calendar: 1820–1821
- Hebrew calendar: 5588–5589
- Hindu calendars
- Vikram Samvat: 1884–1885
- Shaka Samvat: 1749–1750
- Kali Yuga: 4928–4929
- Holocene calendar: 11828
- Igbo calendar: 828–829
- Iranian calendar: 1206–1207
- Islamic calendar: 1243–1244
- Japanese calendar: Bunsei 11 (文政１１年)
- Javanese calendar: 1755–1756
- Julian calendar: Gregorian minus 12 days
- Korean calendar: 4161
- Minguo calendar: 84 before ROC 民前84年
- Nanakshahi calendar: 360
- Thai solar calendar: 2370–2371
- Tibetan calendar: མེ་མོ་ཕག་ལོ་ (female Fire-Boar); 1954 or 1573 or 801 — to — ས་ཕོ་བྱི་བ་ལོ་ (male Earth-Rat); 1955 or 1574 or 802

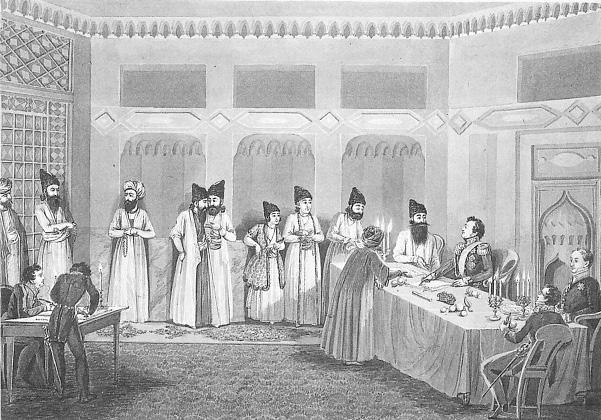
February 22: The Treaty of Turkmenchay is signed as Persia cedes territories to the Russian Empire.

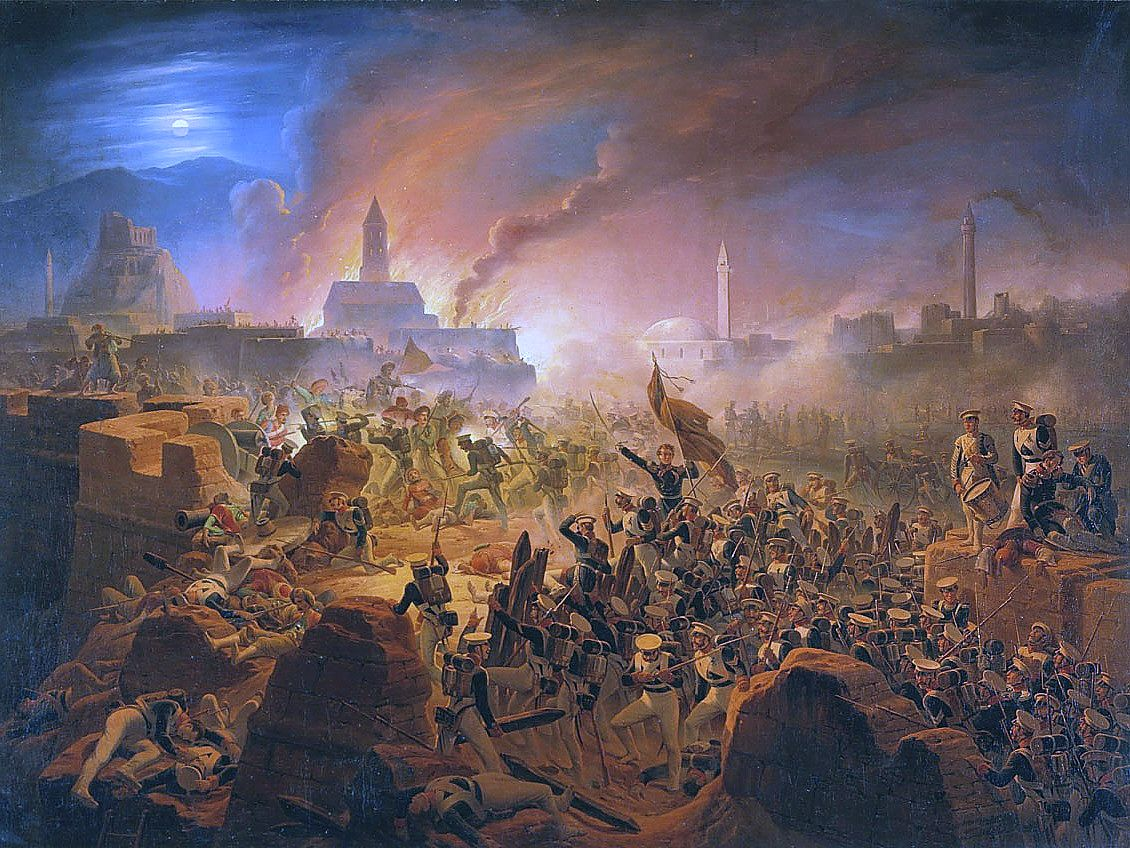
August 21 to 28: The Battle of Akhaltsikhe is won by Russia over the Ottomans.

1828 (MDCCCXXVIII) was a leap year starting on Tuesday of the Gregorian calendar and a leap year starting on Sunday of the Julian calendar, the 1828th year of the Common Era (CE) and Anno Domini (AD) designations, the 828th year of the 2nd millennium, the 28th year of the 19th century, and the 9th year of the 1820s decade. As of the start of 1828, the Gregorian calendar was 12 days ahead of the Julian calendar, which remained in localized use until 1923.

== Events ==
=== January–March ===
- January 4 – Jean Baptiste Gay, vicomte de Martignac, succeeds the Comte de Villèle as Prime Minister of France.
- January 8 – The Democratic Party of the United States is organized.
- January 22 – Arthur Wellesley, 1st Duke of Wellington, succeeds Lord Goderich as Prime Minister of the United Kingdom.
- February 10 – Black War: Cape Grim massacre – About 30 Aboriginal Tasmanians gathering food at a beach are probably ambushed, shot with muskets and killed by four indentured "servants" (or convicts) employed as shepherds for the Van Diemen's Land Company as part of a series of reprisal attacks, with the bodies of some of the men thrown from a 60 metre (200 ft) cliff.
- February 19 – The Boston Society for Medical Improvement is established in the United States.
- February 21 – The Cherokee Phœnix, the earliest newspaper published by Native Americans in the United States and in one of their indigenous languages, Cherokee, is first issued in New Echota.
- February 22 – Treaty of Turkmenchay: By this Russian-Persian peace treaty signed on February 10 at Torkamanchay, Persia (Iran), the latter country is forced irrevocably to cede the territories of the Erivan Khanate (most of modern-day central Armenia and the northern Iğdır Province of Turkey), the Nakhichevan Khanate (most of the modern-day Nakhchivan Autonomous Republic of Azerbaijan), the remainder of the Talysh Khanate (southeastern Azerbaijan), and the Ordubad and Mughan regions (also part of modern-day Azerbaijan) to Imperial Russia. By this and the Treaty of Gulistan (1813) Persia has now lost all its territories north of the Aras River, comprising modern-day Georgia, Dagestan, Azerbaijan and Armenia to Russia. Armenians from Persian Azerbaijan are to be resettled in the Caucasus.
- March 3 – Dom Pedro I, Emperor of Brazil and former King of Portugal, signs a document "to complete my abdication of the Portuguese crown" (made in 1826), to renounce all claims in favor of his daughter Queen Maria II, and to declare "indubitable proof" that he wishes Portugal to be "perpetually separated from the Brazilian nation....in such a manner as may render even the idea of reunion impracticable."
- March 18 – Simón Bolívar, President of Colombia (and former President of Venezuela, Peru and Bolivia), departs from the capital at Bogotá in order to help his ally, General José Antonio Páez, suppress an uprising near the Venezuelan border, but is sidetracked by another rebellion in Cartagena.

=== April–June ===
- April 11 – The city of Bahía Blanca in modern-day Argentina is founded.
- April 18 – Ornithologist Carl Julian (von) Graba lands in the little-studied Faroe Islands for a three-month visit to research the bird life.
- April 20 – French explorer René Caillié becomes the first non-Muslim to enter Timbuktu and later return alive.
- April 26
  - Russia declares war on the Ottoman Empire, beginning the Russo-Turkish War.
  - The Treaty of Commerce and Navigation is signed between Brazil and Denmark, establishing diplomatic relations between the two countries.
- April 27 – The London Zoo opens for members of the Zoological Society of London as the first scientific zoo in the United Kingdom.
- May 9 – The Sacramental Test Act in the United Kingdom removes most prohibitions on nonconformists and Catholics holding public office.
- May 21 – Antonio José de Sucre tries to invade Paraguay, reaching the northern city of Fuerte Olimpo, but the planned invasion is immediately cancelled.
- May 26 – The supposed feral child Kaspar Hauser is discovered in Nuremberg, Germany.
- June 3 – Gran Colombia–Peru War: Gran Colombia's President Simón Bolívar declares war on Peru.
- June 23 – King Miguel I of Portugal overthrows his niece, Queen Maria II, beginning the Liberal Wars.

=== July–September ===
- July 4 – Lord William Bentinck arrives at Calcutta (modern-day Kolkata) to begin his administration as the new Governor-General of India, on behalf of King George IV of the United Kingdom.
- July 5 – The British weekly The Spectator is founded by Robert Rintoul as a radical magazine.
- August 11 – William Corder is hanged at Bury St Edmunds, England, for the murder of Maria Marten at the Red Barn a year earlier.
- August 27 – In South America, the Empire of Brazil and United Provinces of the Río de la Plata (modern-day Argentina) recognize the independence of Uruguay, causing the end of the Cisplatine War. Simón Bolívar declares himself dictator of Gran Colombia.
- August 28 – Russian forces succeed in the Battle of Akhaltsikhe against the Ottomans, capturing the fortress after an 8-day siege.
- September 17 – 1828 Siebold typhoon: A typhoon kills approximately 10,000 people in Kyūshū, Japan.
- September 29 – Russo-Turkish War (1828–29): Varna is taken by the Russian army.

=== October–December ===
- October 4 – Uruguay gains independence from Brazil.
- October 26
  - English naturalist and explorer William John Burchell collects the only known specimen of Parabouchetia brasiliensis, an exceptionally rare member of the nightshade family Solanaceae, in central Brazil.
  - The Office of the Institutions of Empress Maria is established in Russia to maintain the charitable institutions previously under the patronage of the late Empress.
- November 11 – Greek War of Independence: the London Protocol entails the creation of an autonomous Greek state under Ottoman suzerainty encompassing the Morea and the Cyclades.
- November 12 – Anouvong, ruler of the Kingdom of Vientiane, is deposed and the kingdom is annexed by Siam. During the war, the city of Vientiane is obliterated by Siamese forces.
- December 1 – Decembrist revolution (Argentina): Juan Lavalle, returning to Buenos Aires with troops that fought in the Cisplatine War, deposes the provincial governor Manuel Dorrego, reigniting the Argentine Civil Wars.
- December 3 – 1828 United States presidential election: Andrew Jackson is elected President of the United States, defeating incumbent John Quincy Adams in a landslide.
- December 9 – An attempt to assassinate Gran Colombia's President Simon Bolívar fails while he is visiting Jamaica. Bolivar accepts a last-minute invitation to be elsewhere and his servant, hired by the Spanish royal government to kill Bolivar, kills Bolivar's paymaster by mistake.
- December 20 – The U.S. State of Georgia legislature charters the Medical Academy of Georgia, which becomes the Medical College of Georgia, and authorizes it to award a Bachelor of Medicine degree, making it the 13th oldest U.S. medical school and the sixth public medical school to be established.
- December 28 – The province of Echigo, Japan, is hit by a 6.8 magnitude earthquake, killing more than 1,500 people.
- December 30 – Publication (begun on January 14) of Franz Schubert's song cycle Winterreise is concluded posthumously.

=== Date unknown ===
- Friedrich Wöhler synthesizes urea, possibly discrediting a cornerstone of vitalism.
- Ányos Jedlik creates the world's first electric motor.
- The Cornwall Bank, earliest constituent of ANZ bank in Australasia, is formed in Launceston, Van Diemens Land.

== Births ==
=== January–June ===
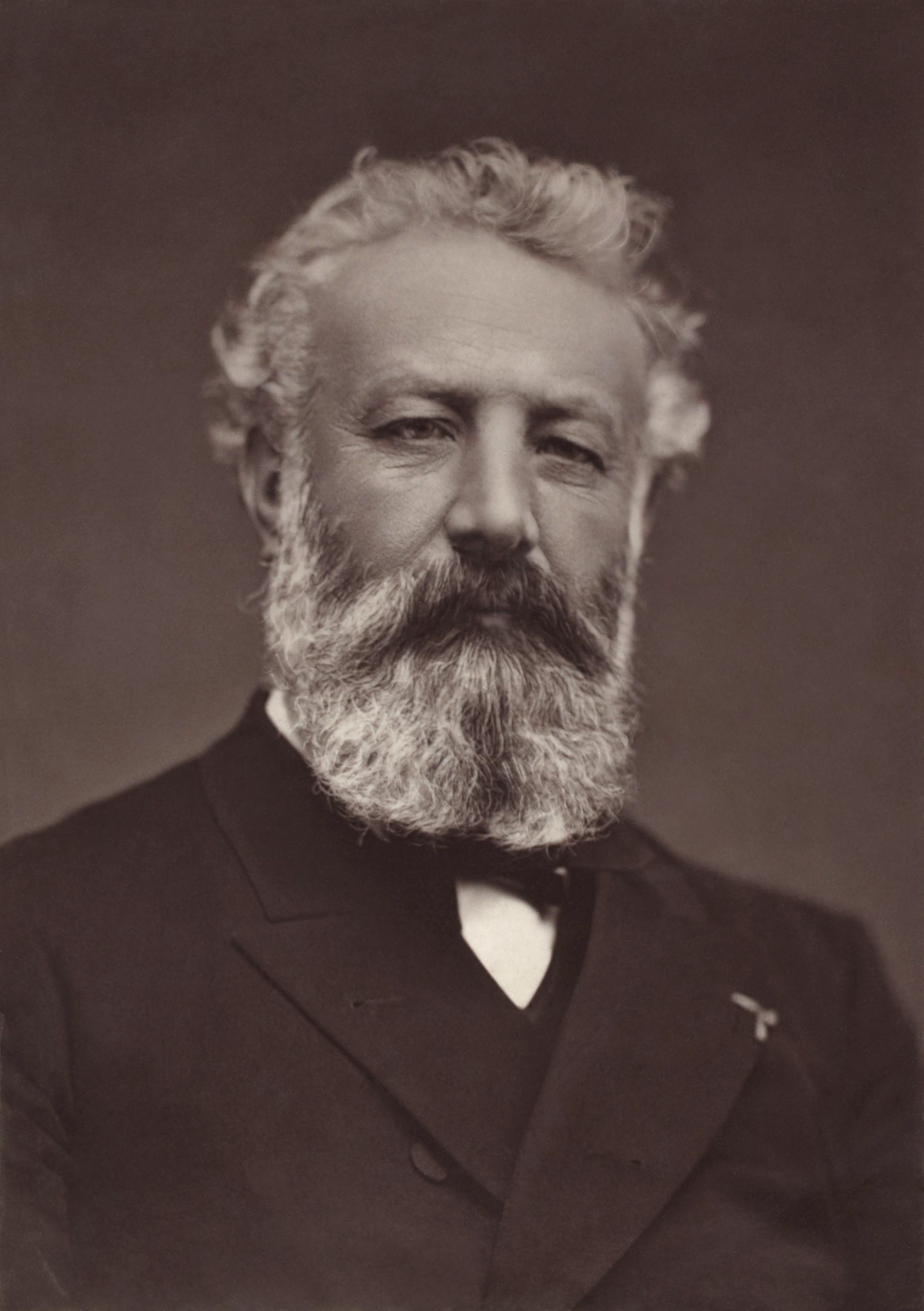
Jules Verne

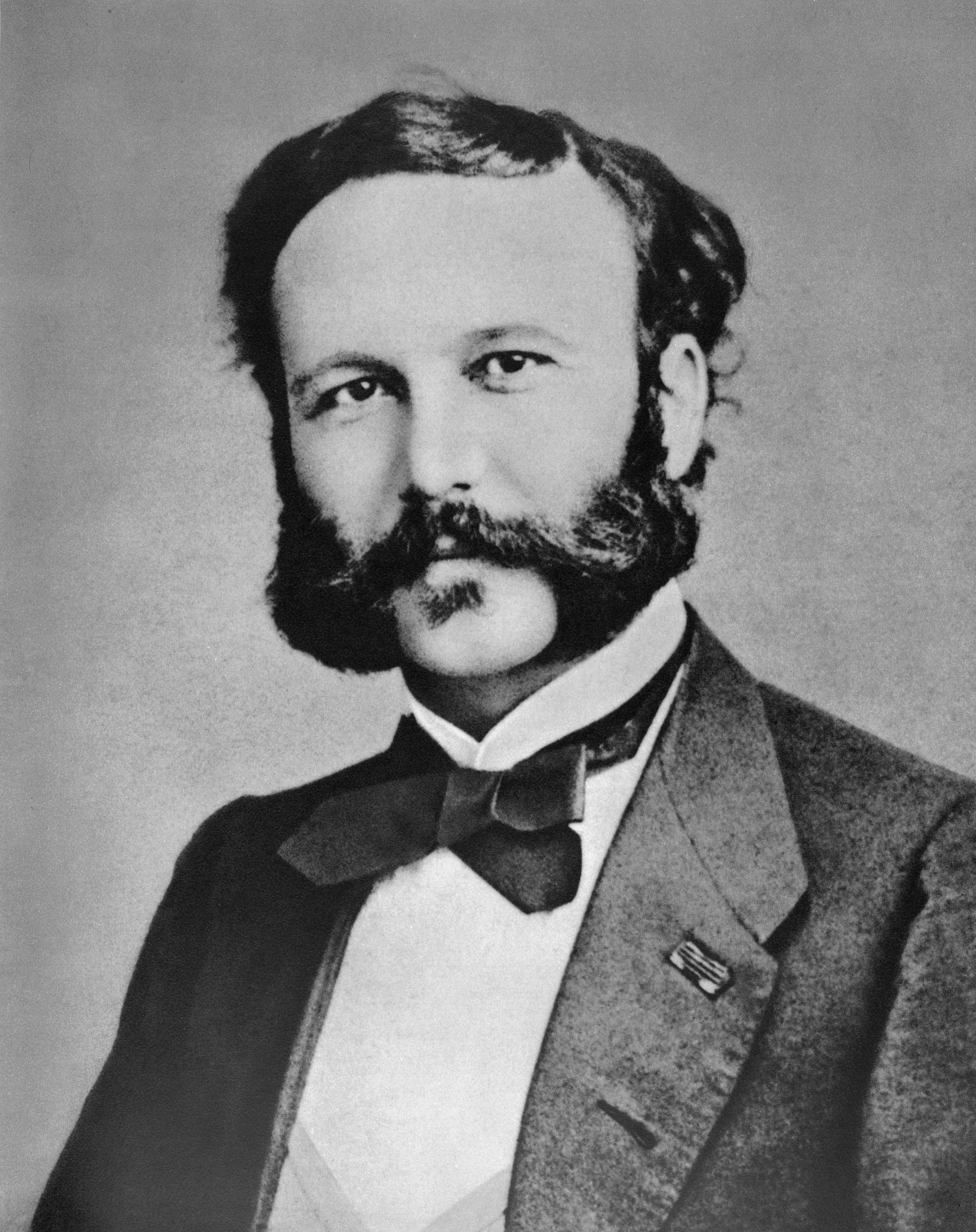
Jean Henri Dunant

- January 17 – Alexandru Cernat, Moldavian-born Romanian general and politician (d. 1893)
- January 22 – Dora d'Istria, Romanian-Albanian writer (d. 1888)
- January 23 – Saigō Takamori, Japanese samurai (d. 1877)
- February 8 – Jules Verne, French science fiction author (d. 1905)
- March 13 – Sébastien Lespès, French admiral (d. 1897)
- March 17 – Patrick Cleburne, Irish soldier, Confederate general (d. 1864)
- March 18 – Sir Randal Cremer, English politician, pacifist, recipient of the Nobel Peace Prize (d. 1908)
- March 20 – Henrik Ibsen, Norwegian playwright (d. 1906)
- March 24 – Horace Gray, Associate Justice of the Supreme Court of the United States (d. 1902)
- March 25 – George Montgomery White, American politician (d. 1860)
- April 17 – Johanna Mestorf, German prehistoric archaeologist (d. 1909)
- April 20 – Josephine Butler, British social reformer (d. 1906)
- April 26 – Martha Finley, American teacher, author (d. 1909)
- April 29 – Étienne Stéphane Tarnier, French obstetrician, inventor (d. 1897)
- May 8
  - Henry Dunant, Swiss founder of the Red Cross, recipient of the Nobel Peace Prize (d. 1910)
  - Charbel Makhluf, Lebanese monk canonized in 1977 by Pope Paul VI (d. 1898)
- May 12 – Dante Gabriel Rossetti, English poet, painter (d. 1882)
- June 21 – Ferdinand André Fouqué, French geologist, petrologist (d. 1904)
- June 28 – Alexandre Franquet, French admiral (d. 1907)

=== July–December ===
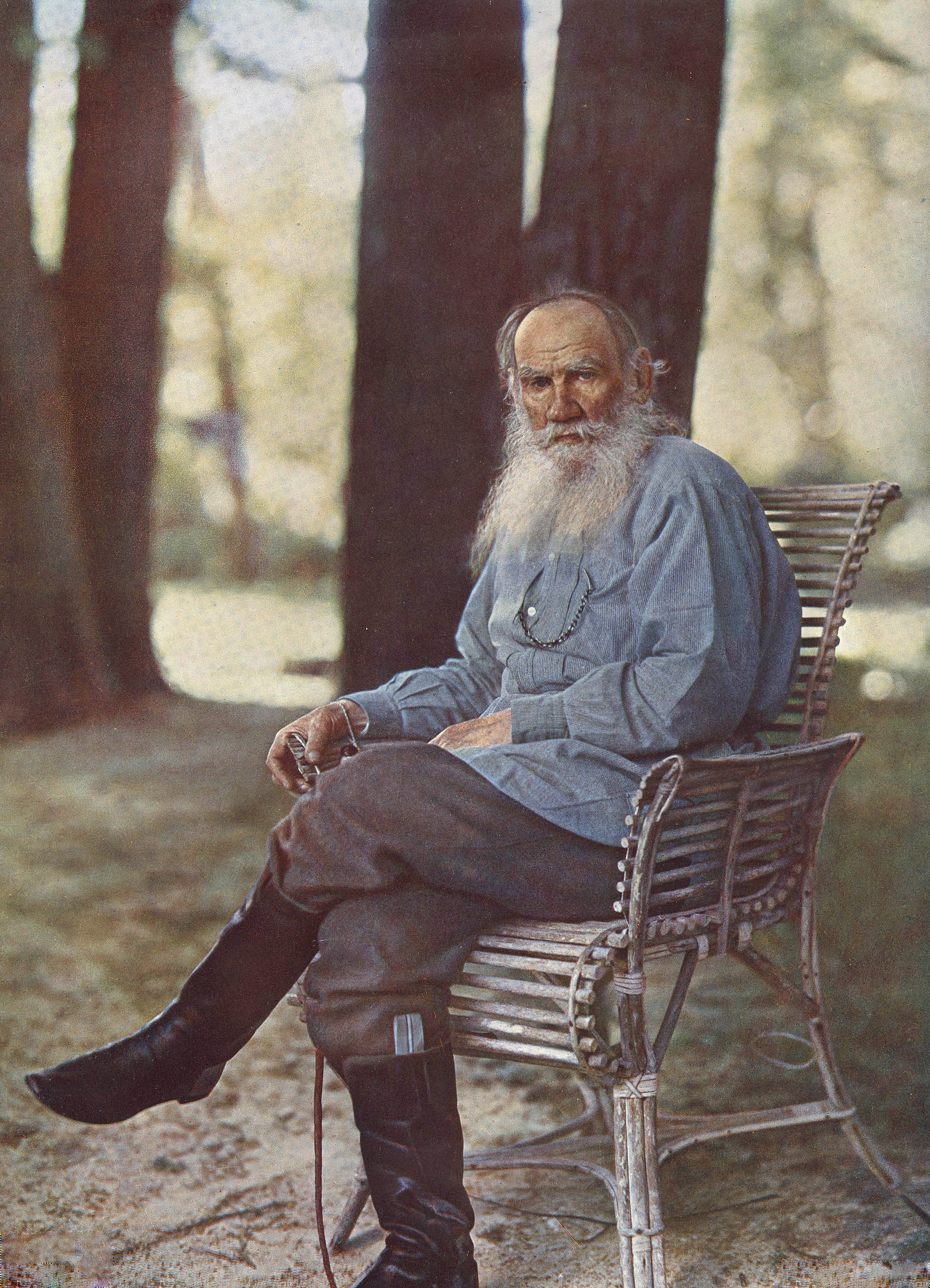
Leo Tolstoy

- July 9 – Luigi Oreglia di Santo Stefano, Italian Catholic churchman (d. 1913)
- July 23 – Sir Jonathan Hutchinson, English physician (d. 1913)
- July 28 – Iosif Gurko, Russian field marshal (d. 1901)
- July 31 – Ignacio de Veintemilla, 11th President of Ecuador (d. 1908)
- August 6 – Andrew Taylor Still, American father of osteopathy (d. 1917)
- August 17 – Maria Deraismes, French feminist (d. 1894)
- August 25 – Jane Stanford, American philanthropist, co-founder of Stanford University, first lady of California (d. 1905)
- August 28 – William A. Hammond, American military physician, neurologist and 11th Surgeon General of the United States Army (1862–1864) (d. 1900)
- September 1 – Anthony Hoskins, British admiral (d. 1901)
- September 8
  - Joshua Chamberlain, Governor of Maine, President of Bowdoin College in Brunswick, Maine (d. 1914)
  - Clarence Cook, American art critic, writer (d. 1900)
- September 9 (O.S.)/August 28 (N.S.) – Leo Tolstoy, Russian writer (d. 1910)
- October 2 – Charles Floquet, Prime Minister of France (d. 1896)
- October 20 – Horatio Spafford, American author of the hymn It Is Well with My Soul (d. 1888)
- October 31 – Sir Joseph Swan, English physicist, chemist (d. 1914)
- November 17 – Milton Wright, American bishop, father of aviation pioneers the Wright brothers (d. 1917)
- November 19 – Rani Lakshmibai, queen of the Maratha-ruled princely Indian state of Jhansi (d. 1858)
- November 24 – Henry Lomb, German-American optician, co-founder of Bausch & Lomb (d. 1908)
- November 26 – René Goblet, Prime Minister of France (d. 1905)
- December 8 – Clinton B. Fisk, American temperance movement leader (d. 1890)

=== Date unknown ===
- William Robert Woodman, British co-founder of the Hermetic Order of the Golden Dawn (d. 1891)
- Ely S. Parker, Seneca lieutenant colonel and first Native Commissioner of Indian Affairs

== Deaths ==
=== January–June ===
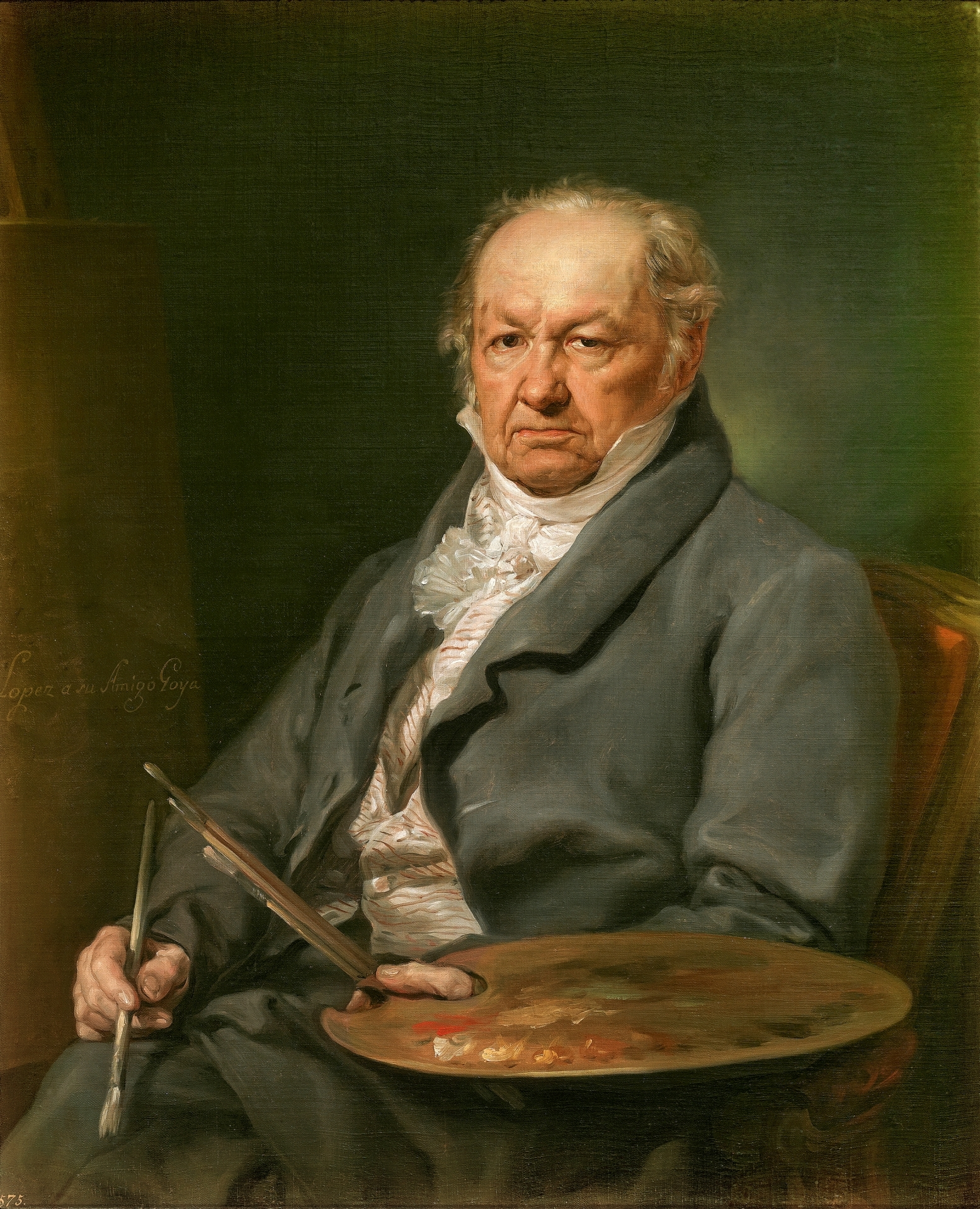
Francisco Goya

- January 10 – François de Neufchâteau, French politician, intellectual (b. 1750)
- January 13 – Theodore Foster, American politician (b. 1752)
- February 11 – DeWitt Clinton, 6th Governor of New York, United States Senator (b. 1769)
- March 12 – Jack Randall, early English boxing champion
- April 16 – Francisco Goya, Spanish painter (b. 1746)
- May 8 – Mauro Giuliani, Italian composer (b. 1781)
- May 16 – William Congreve, British rocket pioneer (b. 1772)
- May 28 – Daikokuya Kōdayū, Japanese castaway (b. 1751)
- June 1 – Lyncoya Jackson, second adopted son of American President Andrew Jackson (b. c. 1811)
- June 21 – Leandro Fernández de Moratín, Spanish dramatist, poet (b. 1760)
- June 25 – Richard W. Meade, American merchant and art collector (b. 1762)

=== July–December ===
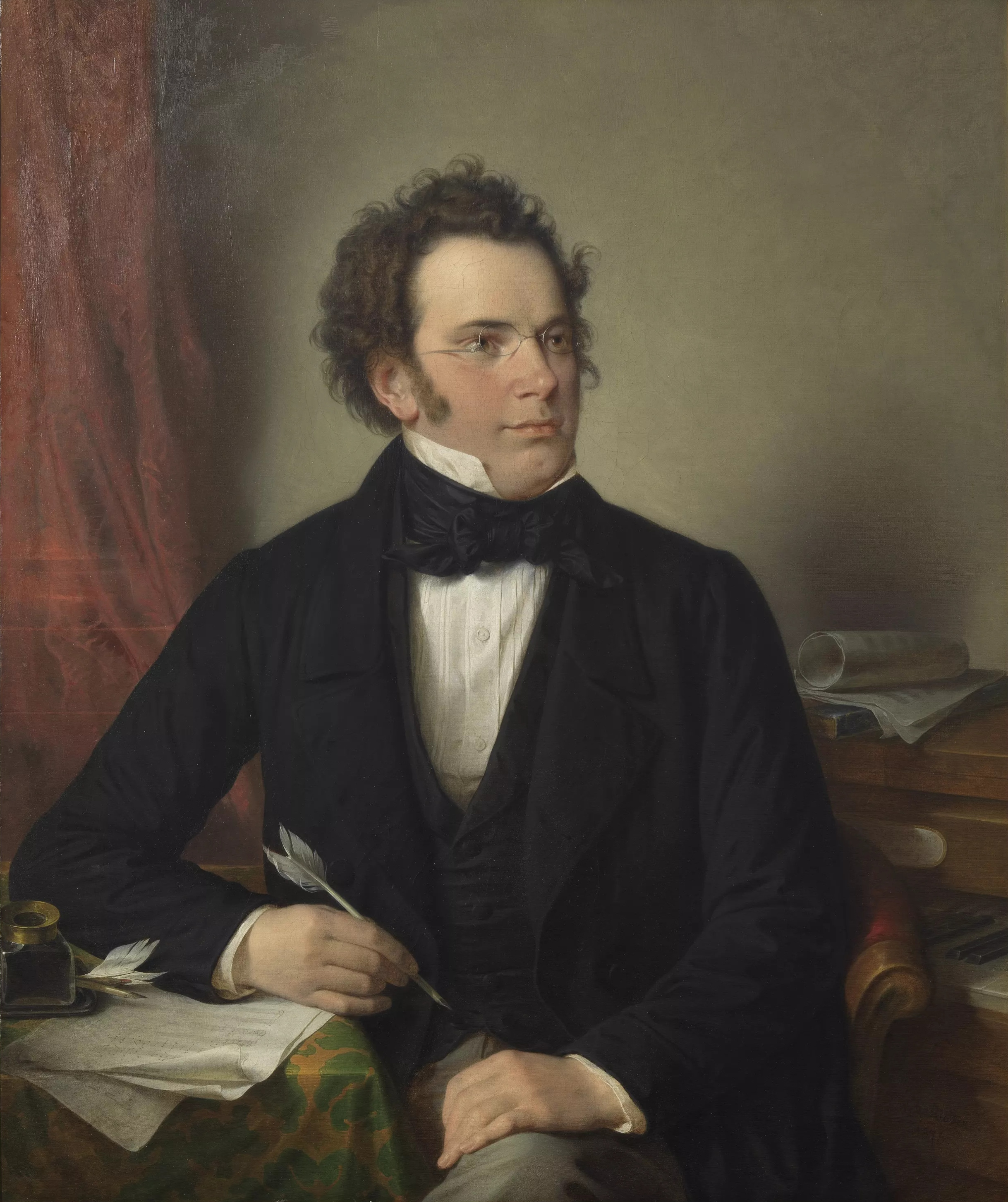
Franz Schubert

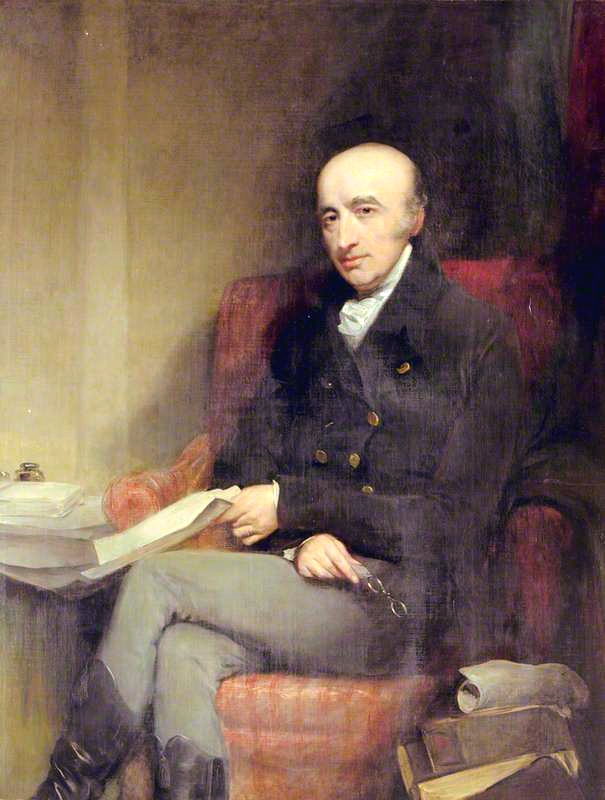
William Hyde Wollaston

- July 9
  - Cathinka Buchwieser, German operatic singer and actress (b. 1789)
  - Gilbert Stuart, American painter from Rhode Island (b. 1755)
- July 15 – Jean-Antoine Houdon, French sculptor (b. 1741)
- July 16 – William Few, American politician (b. 1748)
- July 21 – Charles Manners-Sutton, Archbishop of Canterbury (b. 1755)
- July 30 – François Isaac de Rivaz, French inventor, politician (b. 1752)
- August 8 – Carl Peter Thunberg, Swedish botanist (b. 1743)
- August 22 – Franz Joseph Gall, German phrenologist (b. 1758)
- August 23 – John Foster, 1st Baron Oriel, Irish politician (b. 1740)
- September 20 – George Bethune English, American explorer, writer (b. 1797)
- September 22 – Shaka, most influential leader of the Zulu Kingdom (b. 1787)
- September 25 – Charlotta Seuerling, Swedish musician (b. 1783)
- October 12 – Ioan Nicolidi of Pindus, Aromanian physician and noble (b. 1737)
- October 26 – Albrecht Thaer, German agronomist (b. 1752)
- October 29 – Luke Hansard, English printer (b. 1752)
- October 31 – John Marsh, English music composer (b. 1752)
- November 5 – Maria Feodorovna (Sophie Dorothea of Württemberg), Empress of Paul I of Russia (b. 1759)
- November 15 – Amalie of Zweibrücken-Birkenfeld, First Queen of Saxony/Duchess of Warsaw (b. 1752)
- November 19 – Franz Schubert, Austrian composer and songwriter (b. 1797)
- December 4 – Robert Jenkinson, 2nd Earl of Liverpool, Prime Minister of the United Kingdom (b. 1770)
- December 22
  - Robert Blair, Scottish astronomer (b. 1748)
  - Rachel Jackson, wife of U.S. President Andrew Jackson (b. 1767)
  - Karl Mack von Leiberich, Austrian soldier (b. 1752)
  - William Hyde Wollaston, English chemist (b. 1766)

== Sources ==
- Arana, Marie (2013). Bolívar: American Liberator. Simon & Schuster. ISBN 978-1-4391-1020-1.
- Lynch, John (2006). Simón Bolívar: A Life. Yale University Press. ISBN 978-0-300-12604-4.
- Masur, Gerhard (1969) [1948]. Simón Bolívar (Revised ed.). University of New Mexico Press. ISBN 978-0-8263-0131-4.
- Slatta, Richard W.; de Grummond, Jane Lucas (2003). Simón Bolívar's Quest for Glory. Texas A&M University Press. ISBN 978-1-58544-239-3.
