= Gelibolu War Museum =

- Gelibolu Savaş Müzesi
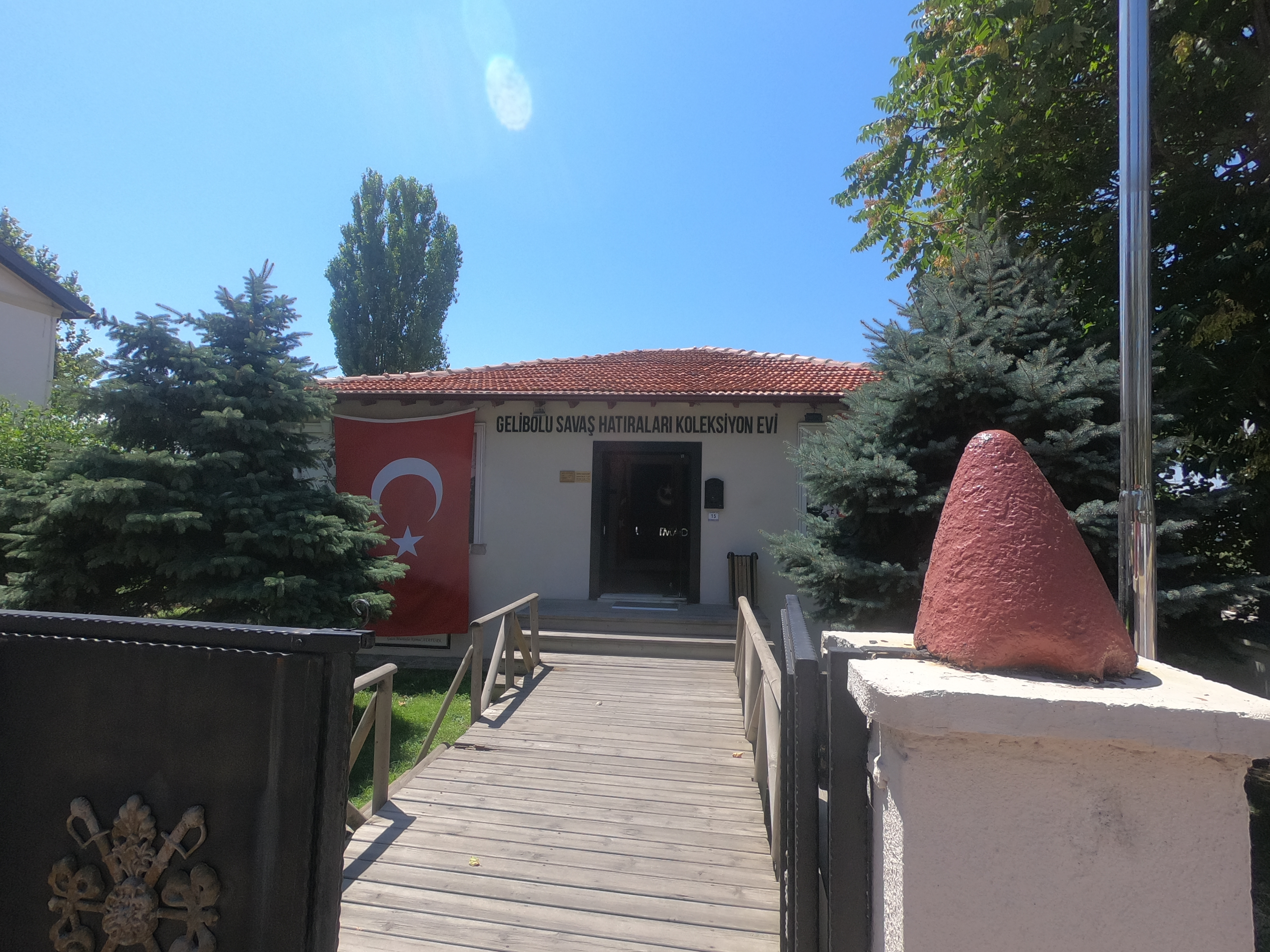

- Gelibolu War Museum
- Established: 2007; 19 years ago
- Type: War Museum
- Owner: Private
- Website: Museum page

Gelibolu War Museum (Turkish: Gelibolu Savaş Müzesi) is a museum in Gelibolu, Turkey.

== Location ==
Gelibolu (Gallipoli) is an ilçe (district) center of Çanakkale Province in Turkish Thrace. It is situated in the north east of a peninsula bearing the same name. Its name is well known because of the Gallipoli Campaign, a series of 1915-battles during the World War I. The museum is on the Kore Kahramanlar street at 40°24′24″N 26°40′05″E.

== History ==
The building which was previously used as a recruiting office and later as a clubhouse of the local sports club was restored and opened as the museum on 16 June 2007. It is a private museum founded by Onur Akmanlar and Murat Söylemez.

== Exhibits ==
There are three rooms on the left; the digger team, the withdrawal room and the naval room. Digger team room is the room of the museum history. There are frequent references to other wars also. Withdrawal room is the room of Allies withdrawal. In this room weapons and various tools the Allies left during the evacuation from the peninsula are exhibited. They are deliberatively cracked by the Allies. These include uniforms, canned foods, flasks etc. . The naval room is the room of the Naval operations in the Dardanelles Campaign preceding the Gallipoli campaign on 18 March 1915. Among the exhibits, Cartridge of French ship Bouvet (a battle ship sunk during the operations) and a rare identification label of a downed French airplane are notable.

The hall to the left is dedicated to the general interest exhibits of the war. There are special sections on Turkish commander colonel Mustafa Kemal (later Atatürk, the founder of the Turkish republic) and the British commander Ian Standish Monteith Hamilton. One room on the left is designed as the typical barrack of the Turkish soldiers during the campaign. The last room on the left which is called glass room houses the glass objects such as wine and dressing bottles, tea glasses etc. found on the battle ground.
