= Battle of Havana =

Battle of Havana may refer to:

- Battle of Havana (1748), a naval engagement between the Great Britain and Spain during the War of Jenkins' Ear, resulting in a tactical British victory
- Siege of Havana (1762), a British expedition to capture Havana during the Seven Years' War, resulting in a decisive British victory
- Battle of Havana (1870), a naval engagement between a Prussian gunboat and a French aviso during the Franco-Prussian War, ending inconclusively
