= George M. White =

George M. White may refer to:

- George Montgomery White (1828–1860), member of the North Carolina House of Commons
- George Malcolm White (1920–2011), Architect of the Capitol
