= Eduard von Knorr =

German admiral (1840–1920)

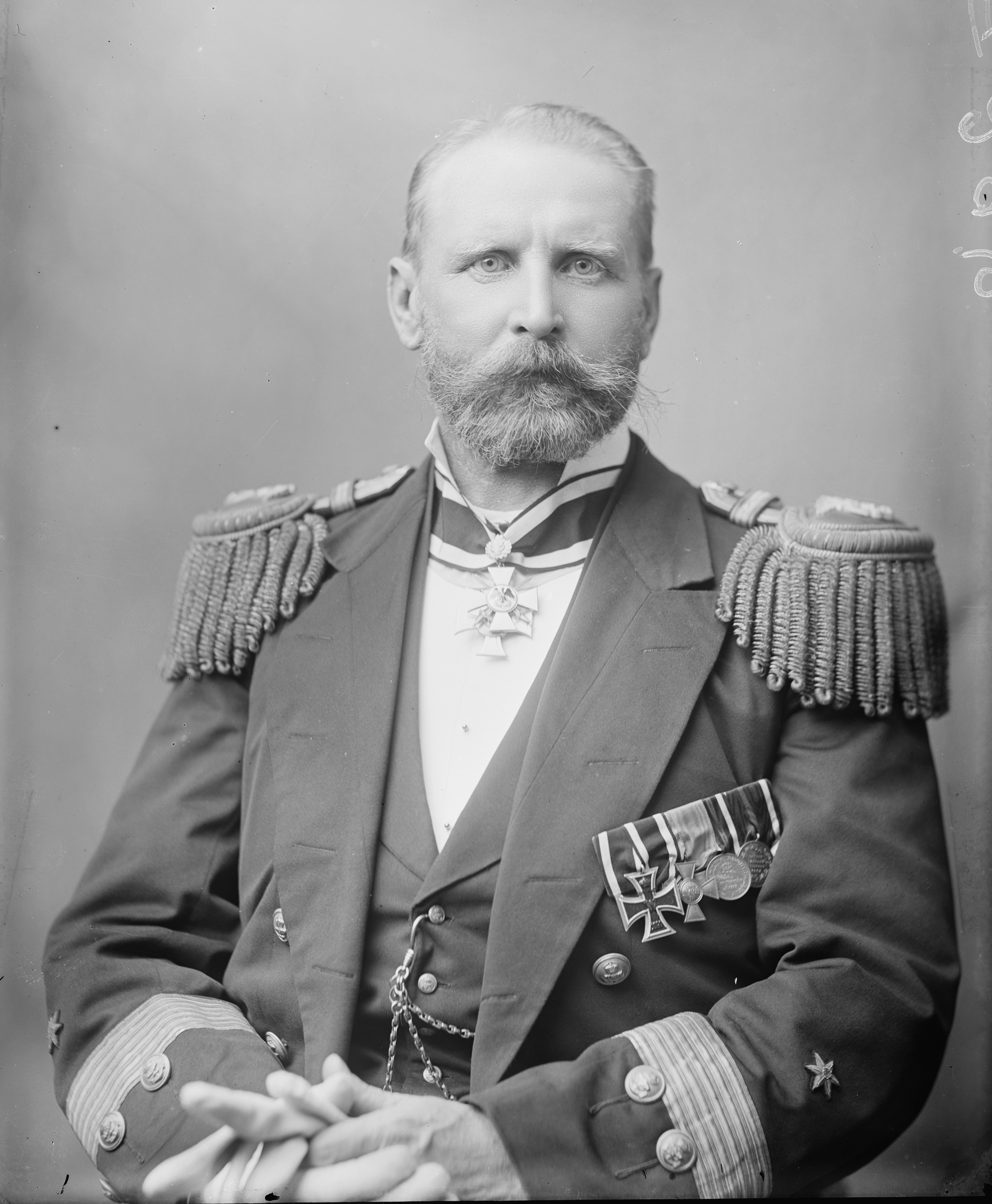
- Portrait of Admiral Eduard von Knorr, Sydney, Australia, 1880, Freeman Studio
- Born: Ernst Wilhelm Eduard von Knorr; 8 March 1840
- Died: February 17, 1920 (aged 79)
- Military career
- Allegiance: Kingdom of Prussia; North German Confederation; German Empire
- Branch: Prussian Navy; North German Federal Navy; Imperial German Navy
- Rank: Admiral
- Conflicts: Battle of Tres Forcas; Franco-Prussian War; Battle of Havana
- Awards: Iron Cross

Ernst Wilhelm Eduard von Knorr (8 March 1840 – 17 February 1920) was a German admiral of the Kaiserliche Marine who helped establish the German colonial empire.

== Life ==
Born in Saarlouis, Rhenish Prussia, Knorr entered the Prussian Navy in 1856. While serving on the paddle steamer SMS Danzig, he fought at the Battle of Tres Forcas against pirates off the coast of Morocco later that year. In 1859 he was promoted to Unterleutnant (sub-lieutenant). From 1859 to 1862, he sailed with the transport ship Elbe on the Eulenburg expedition to the Far East. He was promoted to Leutnant (lieutenant) in 1862 and during the Second Schleswig War, he captained the gunboat Natter. He was promoted to Kapitänleutnant (captain lieutenant) in 1865.

On 12 November 1870, during the Franco-Prussian War, Knorr commanded the gunboat Meteor in a battle with the French aviso Bouvet near Havana, for which he was awarded the Iron Cross 2nd Class. In 1871 he was promoted to Korvettenkapitän (corvette captain).

Beginning in 1874, Knorr took part in a voyage through the Pacific Ocean as captain of the screw frigate Hertha to discuss trade negotiations with Tonga on behalf of the German Empire. He was promoted to Kapitän zur See (captain at sea) in 1876, made Chief of Staff of the Admiralty in 1881, and promoted to Konteradmiral (rear admiral) in 1883.

As commander of the West African Squadron in December 1884, Knorr intervened in disputes between rival clans in Douala, Cameroon, imposing German sovereignty over the Cameroon estuary. He was awarded the Order of the Red Eagle for this success. From 1 April to 4 July 1885, Knorr was Reichskommissar of the German colony of Kamerun. He then commanded a cruiser squadron travelling to Zanzibar and negotiated with its sultan for the acquisition of a strip of German colonial territory in what would become German East Africa.

In 1886, Knorr commanded a cruiser squadron at Samoa. He was promoted to Vizeadmiral (vice admiral) in 1889, Admiral in 1893, and Commanding Admiral in 1895. Raised to the German nobility on 18 January 1896, he received the Order of the Black Eagle on 15 June 1898. He retired in 1899 and was appointed an admiral à la suite of the Seeoffizierkorps.

Knorr died in Berlin. Admiral-Knorr-Straße, a street in Saarlouis, is named after him.

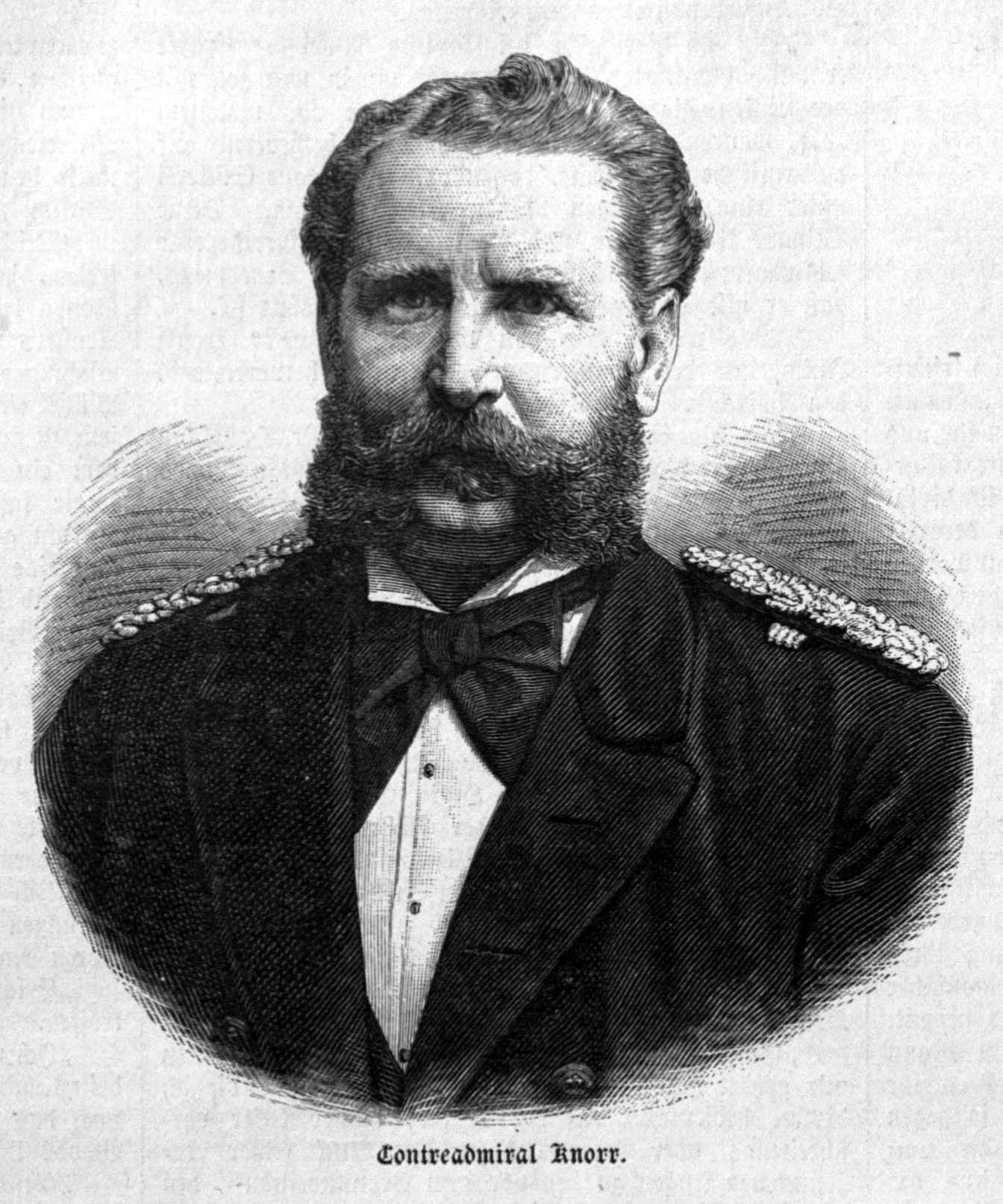
Anonymous portrait of Eduard von Knorr, ca. 1884

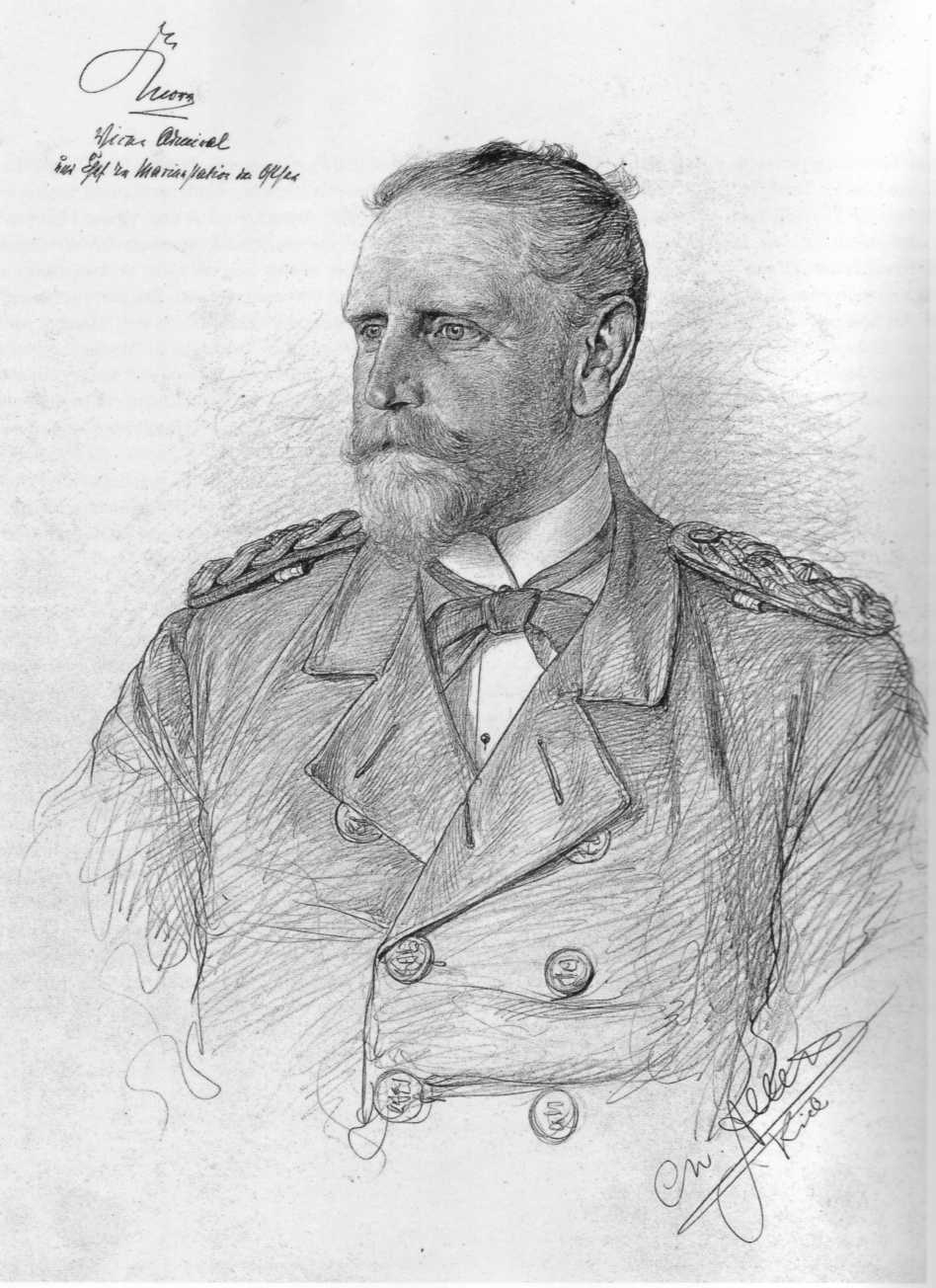
Portrait of Eduard von Knorr by Christian Wilhelm Allers, 1891

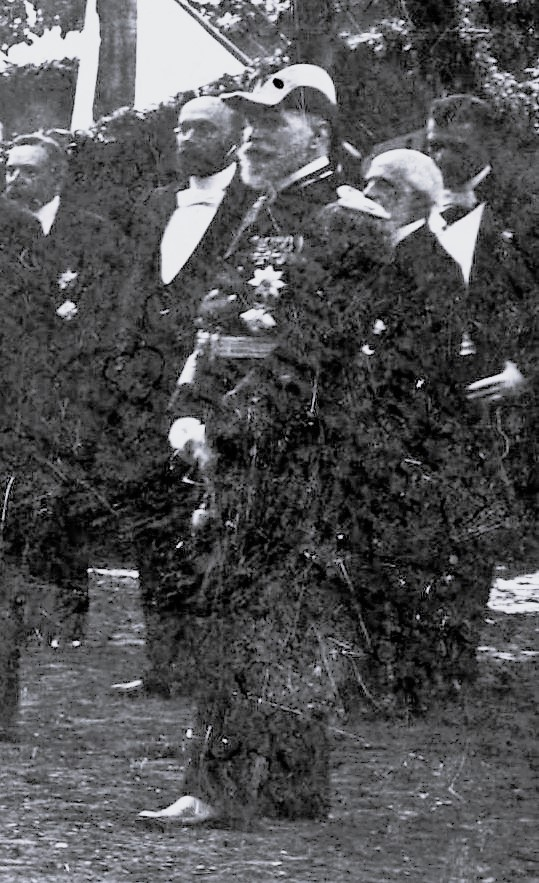
Knorr on the Fondation of the Elbe–Lübeck Canal on 31 May 1895

== Honours ==
German honours

- Knight of the Order of the Red Eagle, 2nd Class with Oak Leaves and Swords, 1885; with Crown, 1894; Grand Cross with Swords on Ring, 27 January 1897 (Prussia)
- Knight of the Order of the Prussian Crown, 1st Class, 18 January 1893 (Prussia)
- Knight of the Order of the Black Eagle, 15 June 1898; with Collar, 17 January 1899 (Prussia)
- Iron Cross (1870), 2nd Class (Prussia)
- Service Award Cross (Prussia)
- Commander of the Order of the Zähringer Lion, 2nd Class with Swords, 1878; Grand Cross, 1895 (Baden)
- Grand Cross of the Military Merit Order (Bavaria)
- Grand Cross of the Order of the Griffon (Mecklenburg)
- Grand Cross of the Albert Order, with Golden Star, 1895 (Saxony)

Foreign honours

- Grand Cross of the Imperial Order of Leopold, 1895 (Austria-Hungary)
- Knight of the Order of the Iron Crown, 1st Class, 1890 (Austria-Hungary)
- Grand Cordon of the Order of Leopold (Belgium)
- Grand Cross of the Order of the Dannebrog, 30 July 1888 (Denmark)
- Grand Cross of the Order of Saints Maurice and Lazarus (Italy)
- Knight of the Order of St. Alexander Nevsky (Russia)
- Commander Grand Cross of the Order of the Sword, 27 July 1888 (Sweden-Norway)
- Knight of the Order of the Brilliant Star of Zanzibar, Class II Grade I (Sultanate of Zanzibar)

== Literature ==
- Hildebrand, Hans; Henriot, Ernest (1988). H — O (in German). Vol. 2. Osnabrück: Biblio-Verl. ISBN 3764814993.
