= Alexandre Franquet =

French admiral (1828–1907)

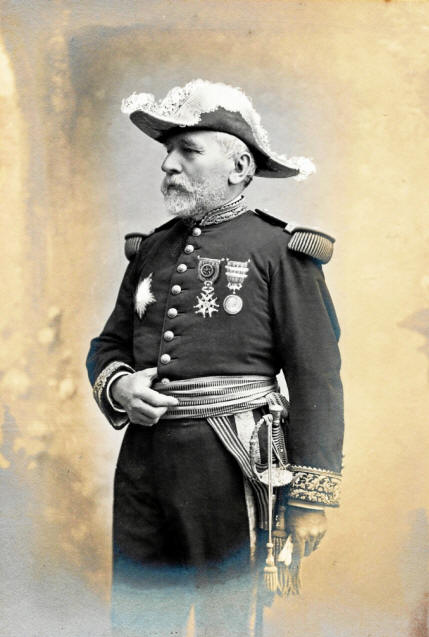
- Born: July 27, 1828; Songy, Marne, France
- Died: August 25, 1907 (aged 79) Lorient, Morbihan, France
- Allegiance: Second French Empire; French Third Republic
- Branch: French Navy
- Service years: 1843–1893
- Rank: Amiral
- Commands: Bouvet
- Conflicts: Crimean War; Second Opium War; Franco-Prussian War: Battle of Havana
- Education: École navale

Alexandre Franquet (28 June 1828 – 25 August 1907) was a French Admiral who participated in the Crimean War, the Second Opium War, and the Franco-Prussian War. He was in command during the Battle of Havana, the most significant naval engagement of the Franco-Prussian War.

== Biography ==
Franquet enrolled in the École navale in October 1843. He took part in the Crimean War, serving on the corvette Galatée and the gunboat Lance (1854–1855) with the rank of Ensigne. He then took part in the Second Opium War aboard the Didon and Primauguet.

During the Franco-Prussian War, with the rank of capitaine de frégate, he was in command of the aviso Bouvet. On 9 November 1870, he fought the German gunboat Meteor off Havana. Following the inconclusive engagement, he was promoted to capitaine de vaisseau. In June 1881, he rose to contre-amiral and took command of the squadron based in Algeria. Promoted to vice-amiral in February 1888, he was appointed Maritime Prefect in Rochefort in September 1892. He retired in June 1893.

== Honours ==
- Commandeur of the Legion of Honour on 28 December 1884, Grand Officier on 10 July 1890.
- Médaille de Crimée
