= Bouvet-class aviso =

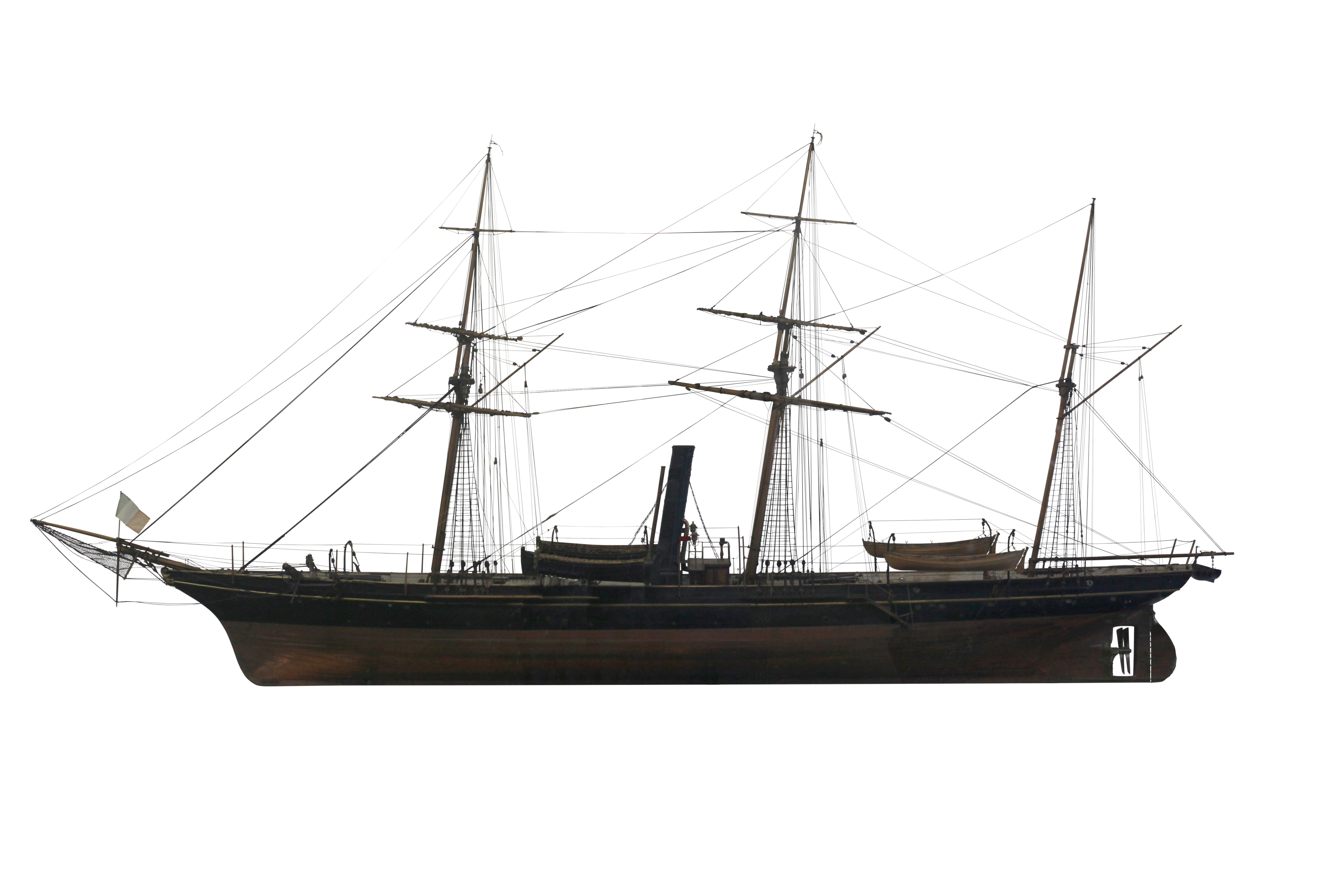
- 1/25th scale model of the steam aviso Bouvet, on display at the Musée national de la Marine in Paris.

Class overview
- Name: Bouvet
- Operators: French Navy
- In commission: 1865-1888
- Planned: 2
- Completed: 2

General characteristics
- Class & type: Bouvet class aviso
- Displacement: 760 tonnes
- Length: 55.75 m (182.9 ft)
- Beam: 8.5 m (28 ft)
- Propulsion: 700 shp (520 kW)
- Complement: 85
- Armament: 1 × 16cm gun; 2 × 12cm gun

The Bouvet-class was a type of sail and steam avisos of the French Navy. Design by Vésigné and La Celle, the ships had a clipper hull, barque rigging and a steam engine with one propeller. They were armed with one 160mm gun and two 120mm guns. Bruat (1867) is sometimes counted among this class.

A model of Bouvet, lead ship of the class, is now on display at Paris naval museum.

- Bouvet

Builder:
Begun:
Launched: 1865
Completed:
Fate:

- Guichen

Builder:
Begun:
Launched: 1867
Completed:
Fate:

== Sources and references ==
- Roche, Jean-Michel (2005). Dictionnaire des bâtiments de la flotte de guerre française de Colbert à nos jours, 1671–1870. Group Retozel-Maury Millau. ISBN 978-2-9525917-0-6. OCLC 165892922.
