= Cape Three Forks =

Cape in northern Morocco

Coordinates: 35°26′18″N 02°58′28″W

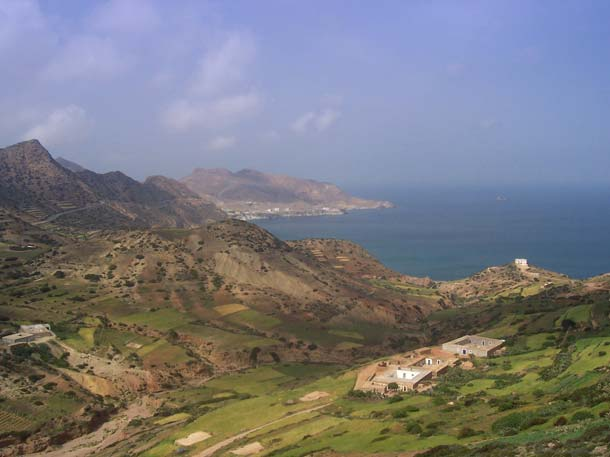
View over Cape Three Forks

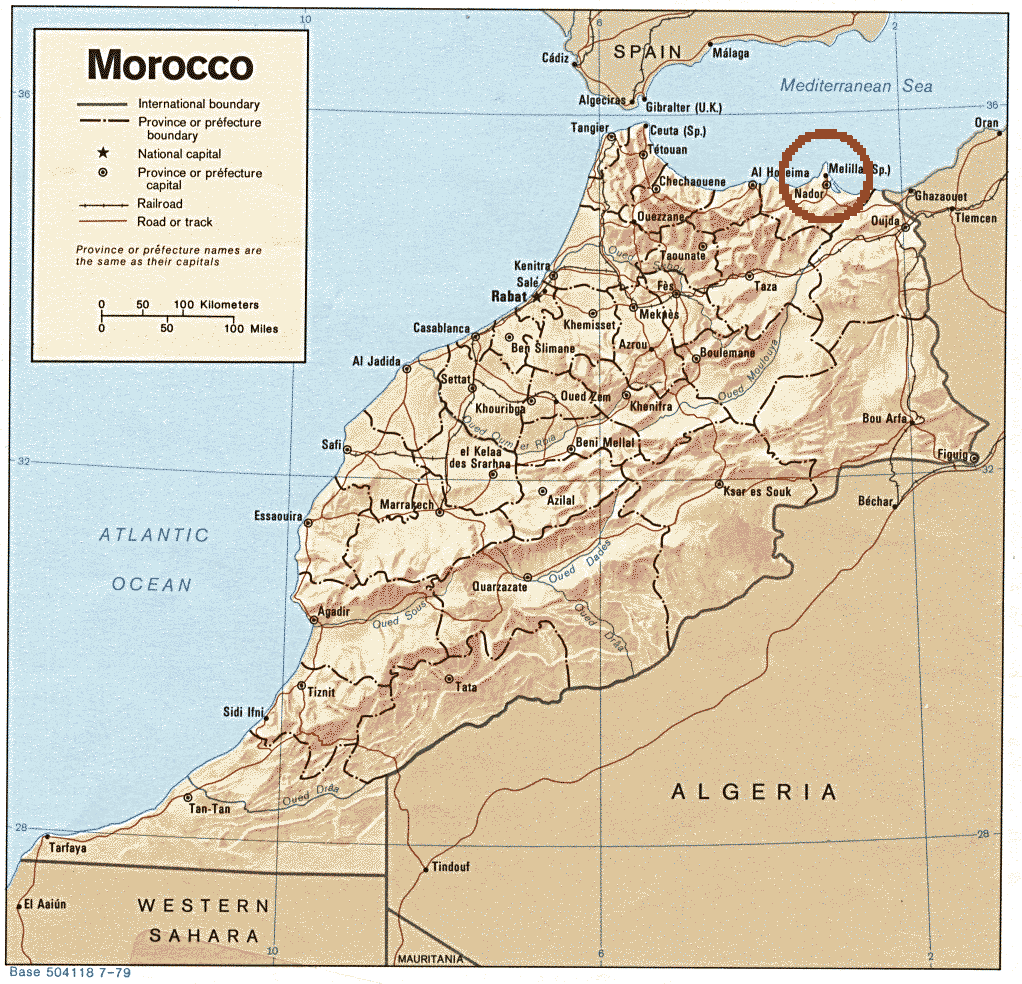
Location in Morocco.

Cape Three Forks, Cape des Trois Fourches, or Cape Tres Forcas is a headland on the Mediterranean coast of Nador Province in northeastern Morocco and the Spanish exclave of Melilla.

== Geography ==
The cape is a large mountainous promontory of North Africa into the Mediterranean Sea. For centuries, this cape has provided both a nautical landmark and a maritime hazard for ships in the Alboran Sea. It is situated in the Nador Province. The Spanish exclave of Melilla surrounds a smaller cape on the eastern side of the peninsula.

== Names ==
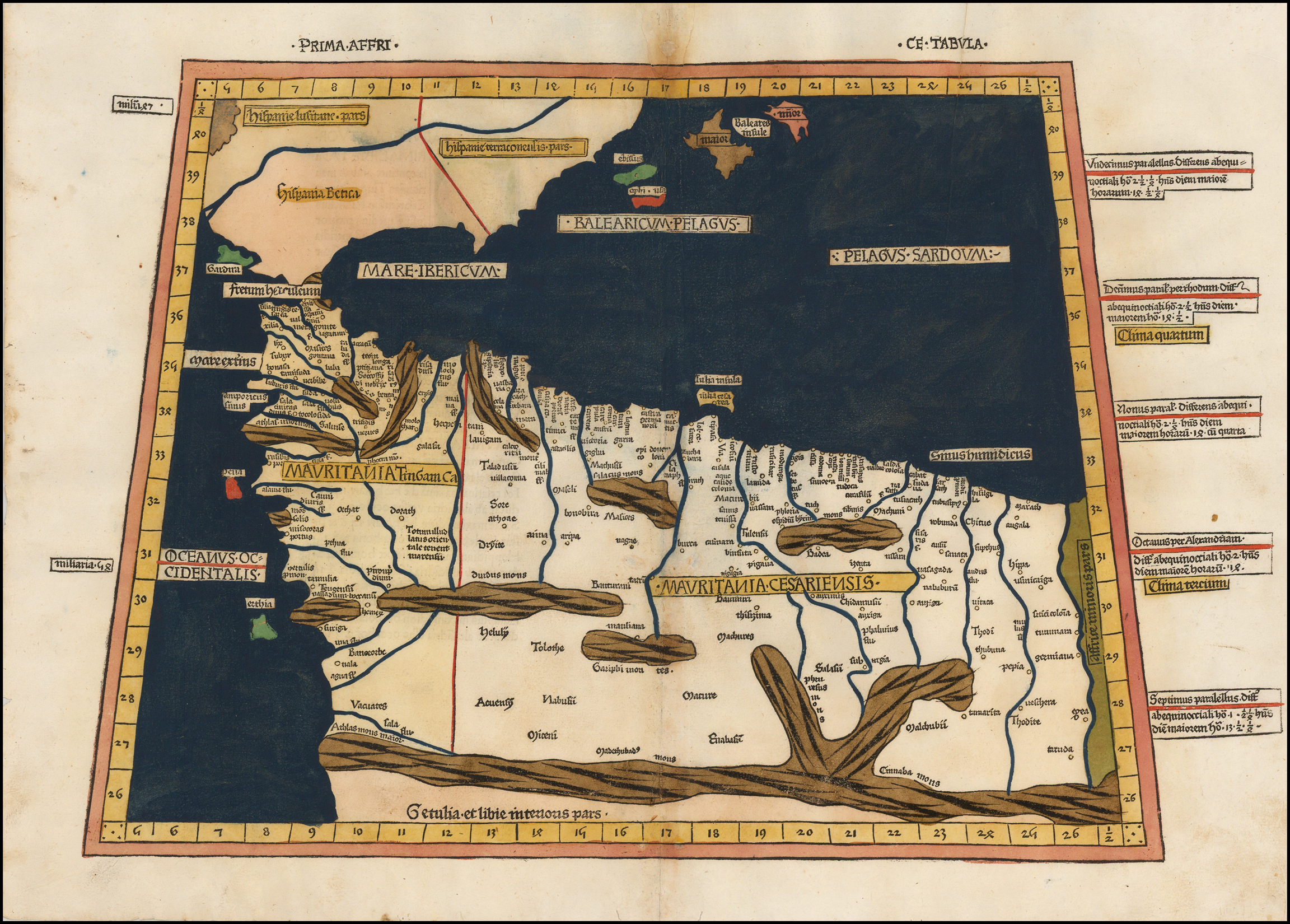
Ptolemy's 1st African map, showing Roman Mauretania Tingitana

In antiquity, the cape was known to the Phoenicians and Carthaginians as Rusadir (Punic: 𐤓𐤔𐤀𐤃𐤓, ršʾdr), giving its name to a nearby port (now Melilla). The name meant "Powerful" or "High Cape", but can also be understood as "Cape of the Powerful One", in reference to Baal, Tanit, and other important Punic deities. It was known to the Romans as Cape Metagonites (Latin: Metagonites Promontorium).

Cape Three Forks is known in Spanish as Cabo de Tres Forcas, in French as Cap des Trois Fourches, and in Arabic as Raʾs ith-Thalāth ash-Shawkāt or Raʾs Thalātha Madari, all meaning "Cape of the Three Forks".

It was also known in Arabic as "Raʾs Uarc".

== History ==
The Merinids build during their reign the Tazouda Castle in the south of the peninsula.

On 7 August 1856, during the Battle of Tres Forcas, a Prussian landing force from the corvette SMS Danzig, led by Prince Adalbert of Prussia, fought Riffian Berber forces at Cape Tres Forcas. The Prussians withdrew after suffering 7 killed and 22 wounded, with Prince Adalbert among the wounded.

On 26 August 1923 the España ran aground and eventually wrecked on the cape.

== Lighthouse ==
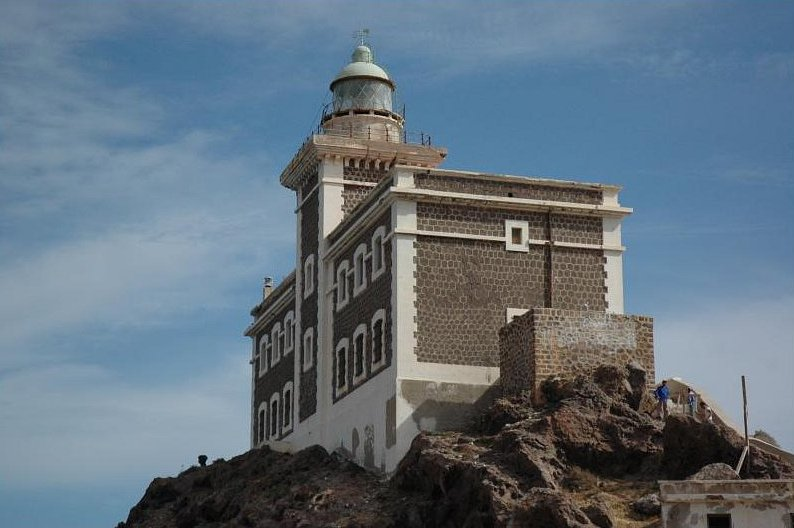
Cape Three Forks Lighthouse.

A lighthouse is located in the north end of the cape. It is a gray tower on white two-story dwelling.

== Maraboutism ==
At least 11 locations in the Cape Three Forks have been identified as places of pious reflection, either small hermitages, bushes or trees, five of them featuring the tomb of the marabout.

== Ecology ==
Designations

Ramsar Wetland
- Official name: Cap des Trois Fourches
- Designated: 15 January 2005
- Reference no.: 1473

Cape Three Forks is a Ramsar designated site with no. 1473. It hosts different species, some of them threatened, such as the Mediterranean monk seal, two species of limpets (Patella ferruginea and Patella nigra), the loggerhead turtle, the fin whale and two species of dolphin (Tursiops truncatus and Delphinus delphis). The main activities taking place in the area are fishing and tourism.
