= French ship Bouvet =

Five ships of the French Navy have borne the name Bouvet in honour of François Joseph Bouvet.

== French ships named Bouvet ==
- Bouvet (1865), a sail and steam aviso
- Bouvet (1876), an aviso
- Bouvet, a battleship sunk by a mine in the Dardanelles during the First World War
- An auxiliary of the FNFL during the Second World War
- Bouvet (D624), a T 47-class destroyer launched in 1951 and struck in 1982
Ships of the French Navy named Bouvet
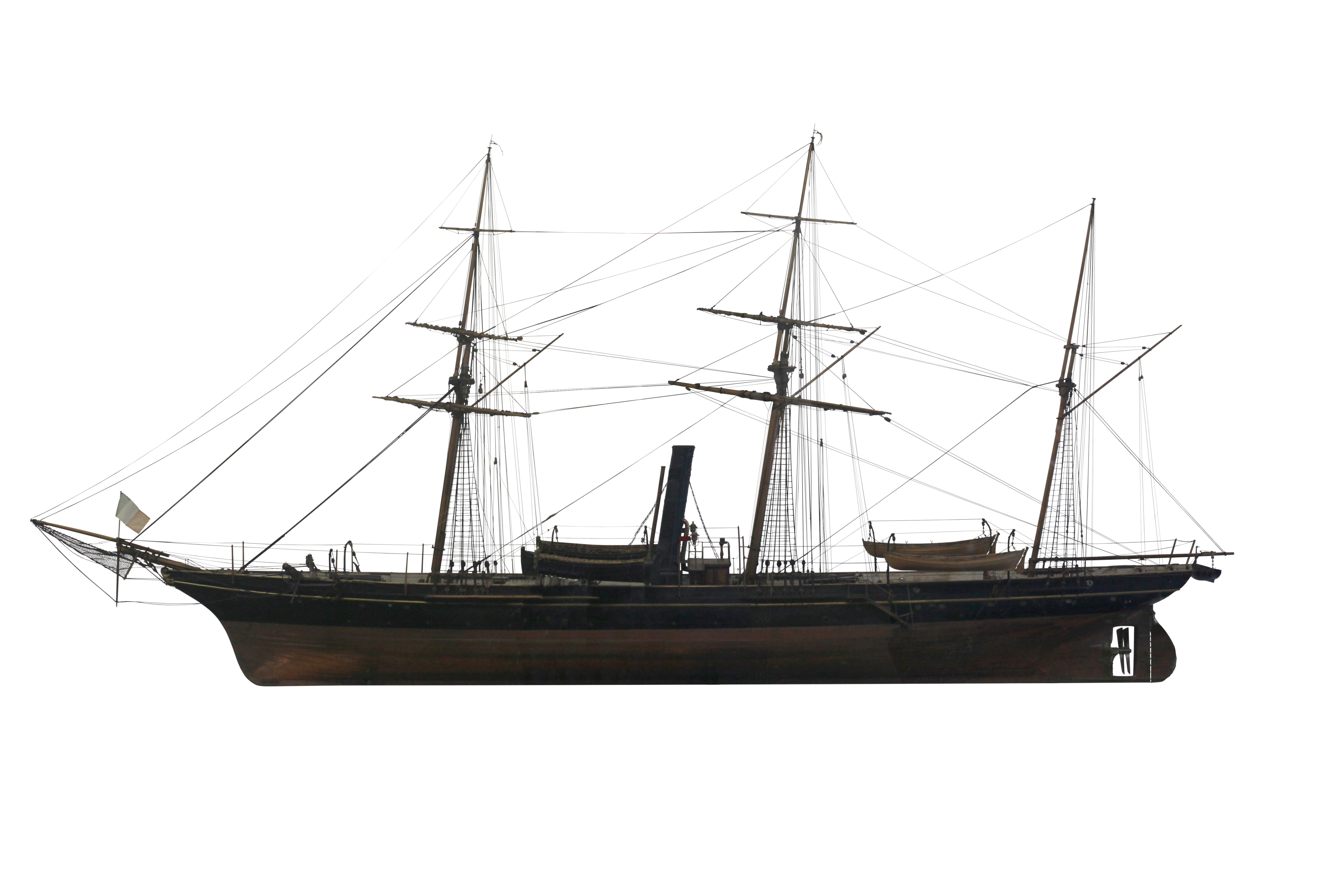
1/25th scale model of Bouvet (1865)

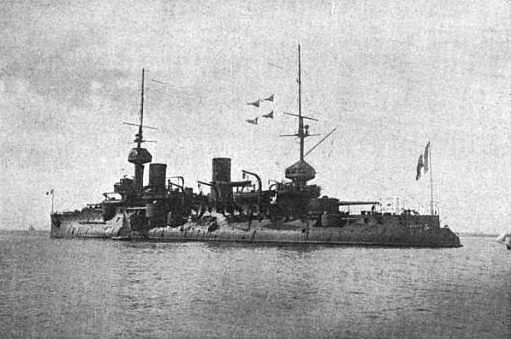
Bouvet (1896)

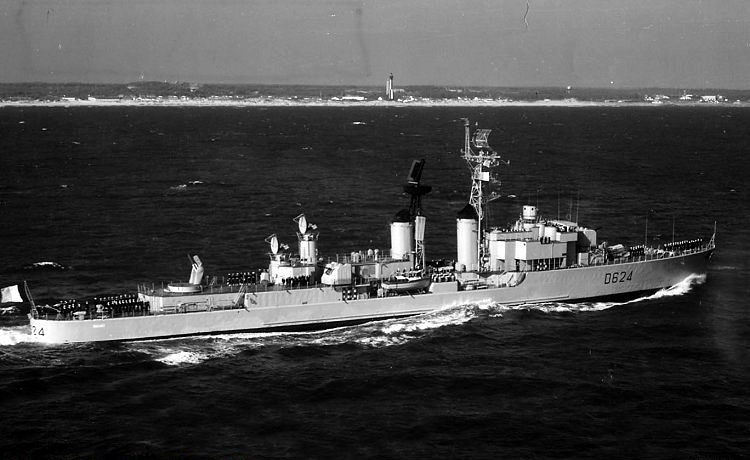
Bouvet (1951)

== Notes and references ==
=== Bibliography ===
- Roche, Jean-Michel (2005). Dictionnaire des bâtiments de la flotte de guerre française de Colbert à nos jours. Vol. 1. Group Retozel-Maury Millau. ISBN 978-2-9525917-0-6. OCLC 165892922.
- Roche, Jean-Michel (2005). Dictionnaire des bâtiments de la flotte de guerre française de Colbert à nos jours. Vol. 2. Group Retozel-Maury Millau. ISBN 978-2-9525917-0-6. OCLC 165892922.
- Les bâtiments ayant porté le nom de Bouvet, netmarine.net
