= Battle of Tres Forcas =

1856 naval battle between Prussia and Morocco

Coordinates: 35°26′18″N 2°58′28″W

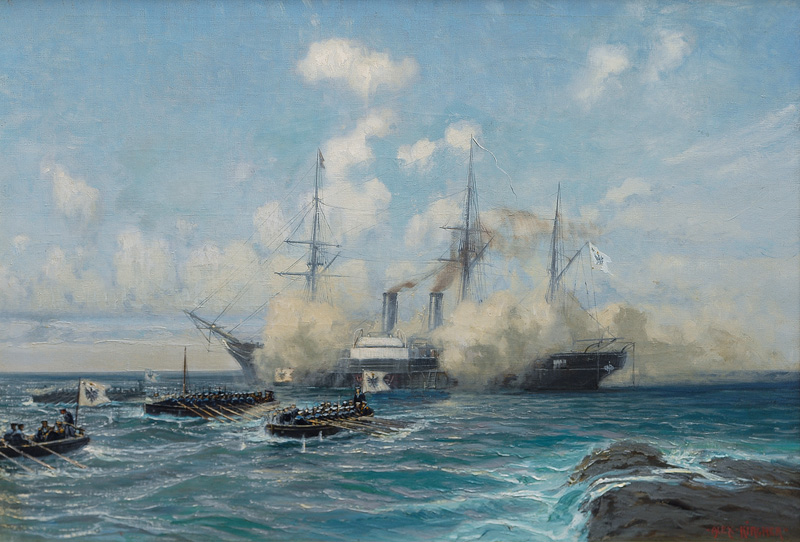
- Battle of Tres Forcas by Alexander Kircher
Date	7 August 1856
Location	Cape Tres Forcas, Morocco
Result	Moroccan victory

Belligerents
Prussia	Morocco

Commanders and leaders
Prince Adalbert of Prussia (WIA); Eduard von Knorr (WIA)	

Strength
14 officers 53 non-commissioned officers, sailors, and marines 2 gunboats	

Casualties and losses
7 killed 22 wounded 2 gunboats damaged	

The Battle of Tres Forcas was a battle on 7 August 1856 between boat crews from the Prussian Navy corvette SMS Danzig (then on a foreign cruise, commanded by Heinrich Adalbert) and the Moroccans. It occurred at Cape Tres Forcas in Morocco, and was one of the first examples of Prussian or German gunboat diplomacy.

The Treaty of Paris of 1856 had decided that a Prussian warship should be deployed to the River Danube's outlet into the Black Sea and, on its way there, Prince Adalbert decided to explore the Rif coast of Morocco. There, four years earlier, on 7 December 1852, the Prussian warship Flora had been shot at by pirates, with one sailor killed and its captain injured.

On 7 August 1856, Prince Adalbert manned two boats and deployed them along the coast. After the boats came under fire from the moroccans, Danzig moved to only 600 metres from the shore to give the boat crews supporting fire. Adalbert then ordered a landing operation by 14 officers and 53 non-commissioned officers, sailors, and marines, led by Adalbert in person. Around noon, he led a surprise attack on a steep rock face nearly 40 metres high under heavy enemy fire. This attack was successful and the Moroccans were forced back to a plateau. However, they were also receiving continuous reinforcements, forcing Adalbert to withdraw in order to prevent himself and his troops from being cut off from the shore.

Prussian casualties amounted to seven dead and 22 wounded, including Adalbert, who was shot through the thigh. Three of the seven bodies had to be left onshore. A subscription from the whole Prussian Navy raised a monument to the dead of the battle in Gibraltar in the form of an eagle, set up in 1863. Despite being a complete tactical failure, the landing and the courage of Adalbert and his sailors were praised for decades to come by the Prussian people and particularly within the Prussian and German Imperial navies.
