= Beaumont le Maître =

Naval officer

Beaumont le Maître was a French Navy officer. He fought in the Indian Ocean under Suffren during the War of American Independence, notably captaining the 64-gun Ajax at the Battle of Trincomalee from 25 August to 3 September 1782 and Saint Michel at the Battle of Cuddalore on 20 June 1783.

== Biography ==
Born the family of a gally captain, Beaumont le Maître joined the Navy as a Garde-Marine on 12 January 1766. He was promoted to Lieutenant on 13 March 1779.

With the outbreak of the Fourth Anglo-Dutch War, France and the Dutch Republic found themselves allied against the Kingdom of Great Britain. The Dutch expected the British to send an expeditionary force to try and capture their Dutch Cape Colony, and Suffren was given command of a 5-ship squadron to reinforce it. Beaumont le Maître was a Lieutenant on the 64-gun Vengeur, under Forbin).

After the Battle of Negapatam of 6 July 1782, Suffren replaced four of his captain, among whom the ailing and possibly senile Bouvet de Précourt. Suffren chose Beaumont le Maître to replace him as captain of Ajax.

Beaumont le Maître commanded Ajax at the Battle of Trincomalee. Suffren was pleased with his performance.

Beaumont le Maître then transferred to Saint Michel, which he commanded at the Battle of Cuddalore on 20 June 1783, again with distinction.
