= René Joseph Bouvet de Précourt =

- Died: 6 October 1782 Trincomalee
- Branch: French Navy
- Conflicts: Battle of Sadras
- Children: François Joseph Bouvet de Précourt

René Joseph Bouvet de Précourt ( — Trincomalee, 6 October 1782) was a French Navy officer. He was captain of the 64-gun Ajax in Suffren's squadron in the Indian Ocean during the War of American Independence, and fought at the Battle of Sadras on 17 February 1782.

== Biography ==
Bouvet-Précourt was a French officer. He served in the French East India Company, making 12 journeys in 18 years and 2 months.

He was the father of François Joseph Bouvet de Précourt.

He served in the French Royal Navy under Admiral d'Aché in 1758 and 1759, rising to Captain.

On 16 February 1780, Bouvet departed Lorient at the command of the 64-gun Ajax, along with Protée, Éléphant and Charmante, escorting a convoy bound for India. In late February, off Spain, the convoy met Rodney's fleet; Protée sacrificed herself to hold the British back and was captured on 24, while Charmante returned to Lorient, arriving on 3 March, and the convoy escaped under the protection of Ajax.

At the Battle of Sadras, on 17 February 1782, Suffren ordered Ajax and Flamand, under Cuverville, to attack the British line to leeward. They both maneuvered to this effect, but then Tromelin, on Annibal, countermanded the order by signaling Ajax and Flamand to return to their post in the line of battle. While Ajax obeyed the order, Flamand sailed on and Saint-Félix, of Brillant, requested permission to replace Ajax. After the battle, Suffren apologised to Bouvet for the confusion in his orders that had frustrated him from a prime role in the battle, promising to make up for it at the next occasion.

However, Bouvet's age and failing health limited his ability to fight. In the following months, his health deteriorated further. In the run-up to the Battle of Negapatam on 6 July 1782, Bouvet requested authorisation to retreat to harbour to effect repairs because the rigging of Ajax had been damaged by a gale the night before. When Suffren refused, Ajax remained with her squadron but without taking part in the action. Suffren was furious. Later in July, Suffren appointed Lieutenant de Beaumont le Maître to replace Bouvet. Suffren described Bouvet as "very ill" and "senile". (Note: Bouvet, « fort malade », qui, pour lui, était atteint de « radotage ».)

Bouvet went to found passage from Cuddalore to Trincomalee, where he hoped to find a ship to Isle de France (Mauritius), but he died in Trincomalee from scurvy.
