= Heliotropium macrodon =

Scientific classification
- Kingdom: Plantae
- Clade: Embryophytes
- Clade: Tracheophytes
- Clade: Spermatophytes
- Clade: Angiosperms
- Clade: Eudicots
- Clade: Asterids
- Order: Boraginales
- Family: Heliotropiaceae
- Genus: Heliotropium
- Species: H. macrodon

Binomial name
- Heliotropium macrodon (Fresen.) Gürke

Synonyms
- Parabouchetia brasiliensis Baill.; Schleidenia macrodon Fresen.

Species of flowering plants

Heliotropium macrodon is a species of flowering plant in the family Boraginaceae, native to central Brazil. It was first described as Schleidenia macrodon. Parabouchetia brasiliensis, formerly the sole species placed in the genus Parabouchetia, has been synonymized with this species.

== Description ==
Heliotropium macrodon is a slender herb with small narrow leaves and bearing small flowers.

== Taxonomy ==
Heliotropium macrodon was first described by Georg Fresenius in 1857 as Schleidenia macrodon. It was transferred to the genus Heliotropium by Max Gürke in 1894.

On 26 October 1828, the English explorer and naturalist William John Burchell of Fulham collected a plant growing in a location in central Brazil between São Bento and Rio Cangalho in the state of Goiás, towards the north-northeast of Brasília. The specimen was described in 1887 by Henri Ernest Baillon as Parabouchetia brasiliensis, the sole species in his new genus Parabouchetia. Under this name it was said to be of "astounding rarity". As of March 2024, Plants of the World Online regarded Parabouchetia brasiliensis as a synonym of Heliotropium macrodon.
