= French aviso Bouvet (1865) =

Ship of the French Navy

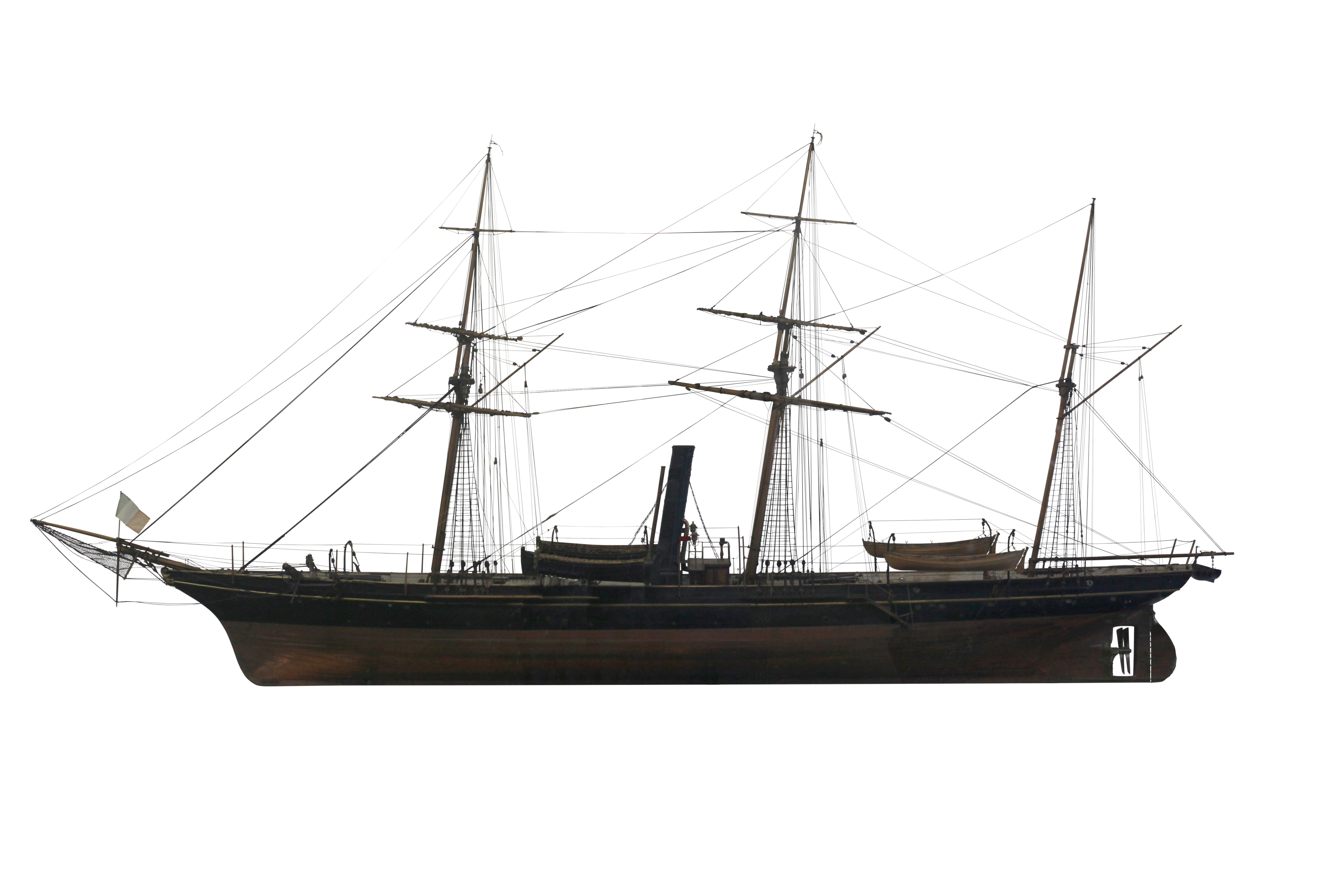
- 1/25th scale model of the steam aviso Bouvet, on display at the Musée national de la Marine in Paris

History

France
- Name: Bouvet
- Namesake: François Joseph Bouvet.
- Builder: Rochefort
- Laid down: 2 October 1863
- Launched: 24 May 1865
- Fate: Wrecked on 17 September 1871 off Île-à-Vache

General characteristics
- Class & type: Bouvet class aviso
- Displacement: 760 tonnes
- Length: 55.75 m (182.9 ft)
- Beam: 8.5 m (28 ft)
- Propulsion: 700 shp (520 kW)
- Complement: 85
- Armament: 1 × 16cm gun; 2 × 12cm gun

Bouvet was a sail and steam aviso of the French Navy, lead ship of her class. She is remembered as the opponent of the German gunboat SMS Meteor during the Battle of Havana in 1870, at the outbreak of the Franco-Prussian War.

== Career ==
Commissioned on 18 June 1866, Bouvet served in Mexico, in the Caribbean and off Terre-Neuve.

At the outbreak of the Franco-Prussian War, she was sent to the Caribbean, where she intervened to rescue the liner SS Nouveau Monde. Under Commander Franquet, she fought against SMS Meteor during the Battle of Havana, managing to ram her opponent and knocking out two of her masts, but suffering herself a shot in a steam pipe which forced her to return into Cuban waters and avoid capture.

Bouvet was wrecked on 17 September 1871 off Île-à-Vache, when a gust of wind sent her onto a reef. The crew managed to safely abandon ship.
