= George Montgomery White =

American politician (1828–1860)

Member of the North Carolina House of Commons from Bladen County
- In office November 20, 1854 – February 3, 1857
- Preceded by: John G. McDugald
- Succeeded by: John Wesley Purdie

Personal details
- Born: March 25, 1828 Bladen County, North Carolina, U.S.
- Died: June 26, 1860 (aged 32) Bladen County, North Carolina, U.S.
- Spouse: Victoria Harrison Lewis (m. 1858)
- Education: University of North Carolina (AB)
- Occupation: Attorney; politician
- Burial place: Hendon Cemetery; 34.60310°N 78.64250°W

George Montgomery White (March 25, 1828 – June 26, 1860) was an American politician in North Carolina who was a two-term member of the North Carolina House of Commons from Bladen County.

== Biography ==
George Montgomery White was born on March 25, 1828, and was the son of Griffith John White and Mary Jane Hendon. He was listed as a freshman at the University of North Carolina in the 1849–1850 academic year and received a Bachelor of Arts degree in 1853. White was reported to have obtained a North Carolina Superior Court license in 1855. He was considered to be a lawyer of prominence and was a leader of the bar in the Cape Fear region. He was a member of the North Carolina House of Commons from Bladen County from 1854 to 1857.

He died on June 26, 1860, aged 32 years, 3 months, and 1 day.

== Personal life ==
White married Victoria Harrison Lewis in 1858.

His brother William Hendon White was later elected as the democratic sheriff of Bladen County after the American Civil War, but was removed by reconstruction officials. William "became conspicuous during war times and in the violent scenes which characterized the reconstruction period."

Preceded by John G. McDugald	Member of the North Carolina House of Commons from Bladen County; 1854–1857	Succeeded by John Wesley Purdie
