= François Joseph Bouvet =

French admiral (1753–1832)

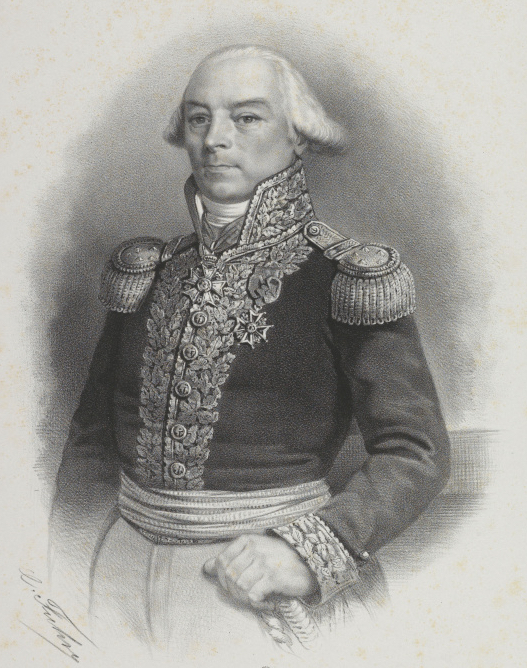

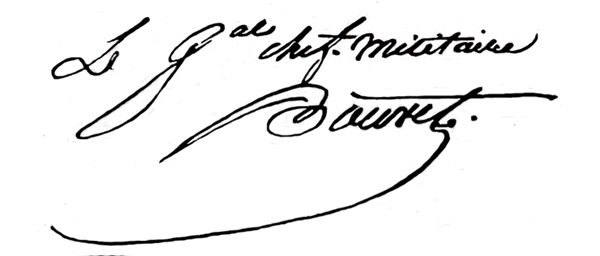
- Signature

François Joseph Bouvet (French pronunciation: [fʁɑ̃swa ʒozɛf buvɛ]; 1753–1832) was a French admiral.

== Early life ==
Son of René Joseph Bouvet de Précourt, a captain in the service of the French East India Company and of the French Royal Navy under Suffren, François Joseph Bouvet went to sea at the age of twelve with his father aboard the Villevault in 1765. In 1780, Bouvet served in the East Indies in the famous campaign of 1781–83 under the command of Suffren. He was promoted to lieutenant (Lieutenant de vaisseau) in 1785.

== Naval career ==
On the outbreak of the French Revolution he very naturally took a Republican stance. In 1790, he became second officer aboard the Prudence. In 1790, he was promoted captain (capitaine de vaisseau) and received the command of the Audacieux (80) in the first great fleet collected by the Republic. In the same year (1793) he was promoted to rear-admiral, and command the Second Squadron of the fleet in Brest, which fought the Battle of the First of June (1794) against Lord Howe.

Until the close of 1796 he continued in command of a squadron in the French Channel fleet. In the December of that year he was entrusted with the van division of the fleet which was sent from Brest to attempt to land General Hoche with an expeditionary force in the south of Ireland. The stormy weather scattered the French as soon as they left Brest. Bouvet, who found himself at daybreak on 17 December separated with nine sail of the line from the rest of the fleet, opened his secret orders, and found that he was to make his way to Mizen Head. He took a wide course to avoid meeting British cruisers, and on the 19th fell in with a considerable part of the rest of the fleet and some of the transports. On 21 December he arrived off Dursey Island at the entry to Bantry Bay. On 24 December he anchored near Bere Island with part of his fleet. The continued storms which blew down Bantry Bay made it impossible to land the troops he had with him. On the evening of 25 December the storm increased to such a pitch of violence that the frigate Immortalité in which Bouvet had hoisted his flag was blown out to sea. The wind moderated by 29 December, but Bouvet, being convinced that none of the ships of his squadron could have remained at the anchorage, steered for Brest, where he arrived on 1 January 1797.

His fortune had been very much that of his colleagues in this storm-tossed expedition, and on the whole he had shown more energy than most of them. He was wrong, however, in thinking that all his squadron had failed to keep their anchorage in Bantry Bay. The government, displeased by his precipitate return to Brest, dismissed him from command soon afterwards. He was compelled to open a school to support himself. Napoleon restored him to the service, and he commanded the 2-ships of the line and 4-frigates squadron sent to occupy Guadeloupe during the peace of Amiens, hoisting his flag on the Redoutable.

In 1803, he was promoted to military chief of Brest harbour, and later préfet maritime of Brest, in 1813. In December 1813, distrusted by Napoleon, he was replaced by Cosmao-Kerjulien.

At the Restoration, he was made a baron by Louis XVIII, in July 1814. Promoted to vice-admiral in 1816, he was préfet maritime of Lorient, and left active service in November 1817. He died in 1832.

== Sources and references ==
=== Bibliography ===
- Cunat, Charles (1852). Histoire du Bailli de Suffren. Rennes: A. Marteville et Lefas. p. 447.
- Troude, Onésime-Joachim (1867). Batailles navales de la France (in French). Vol. 2. Challamel ainé.
- Troude, Onésime-Joachim (1867). Batailles navales de la France (in French). Vol. 3. Challamel ainé.
- James, William (1826). The naval history of Great Britain from the declaration of war by France in February 1793 to the accession of George IV in January 1820 : with an account of the origin and progressive increase of the British Navy. Vol. 1. London: Harding, Lepard and Co. 567 pages
- James, William (1822). The naval history of Great Britain from the declaration of war by France in February 1793 to the accession of George IV in January 1820 : with an account of the origin and progressive increase of the British Navy. Vol. 2. London: Harding, Lepard and Co. 646 pages
