= Japan–Netherlands relations =

- Japan: Netherlands

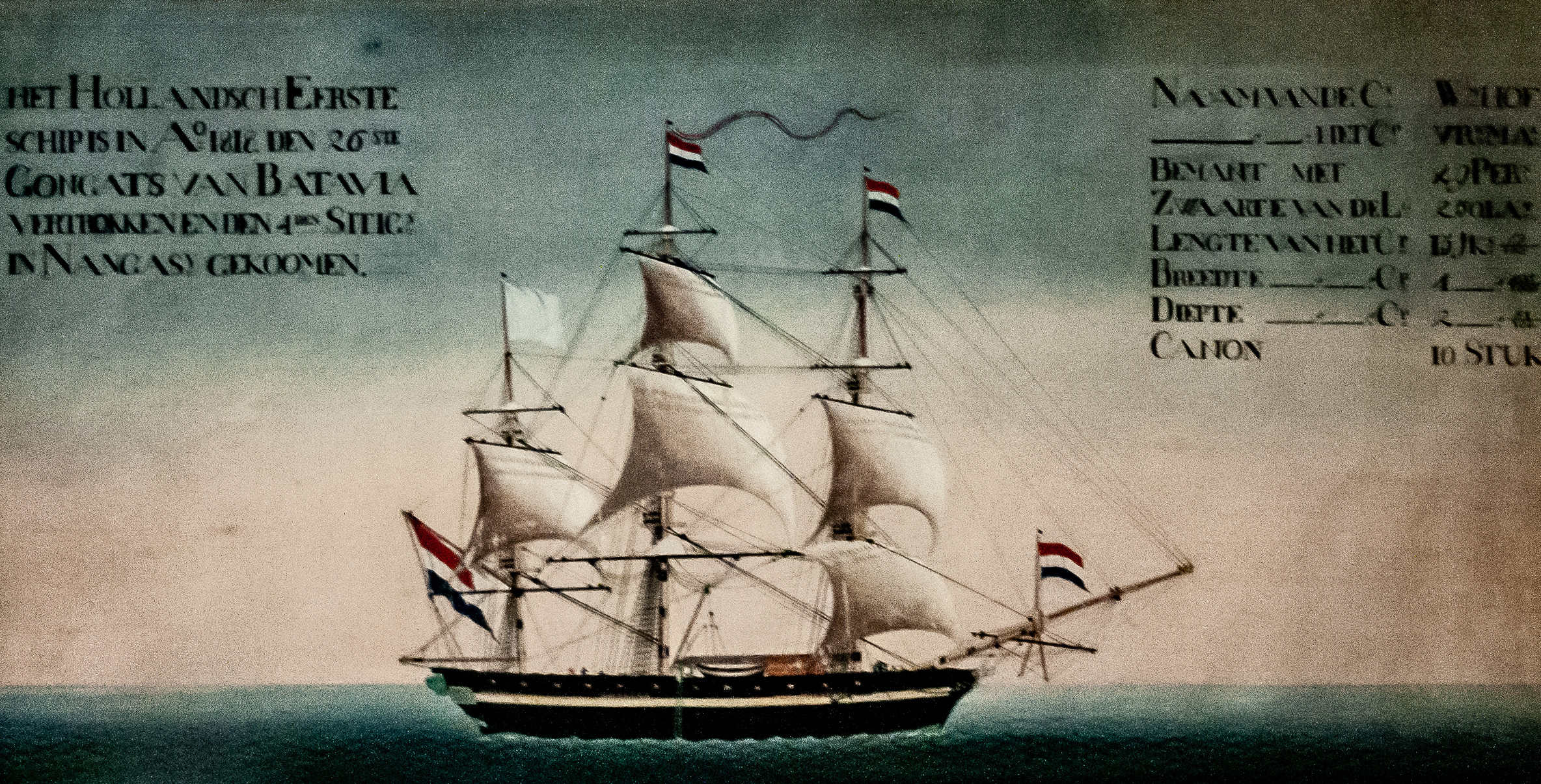
Dutch ship arriving in Nagasaki in 1818

Japan–Netherlands relations are the bilateral relations between Japan and the Netherlands. Relations between Japan and the Netherlands date back to 1609, when the first formal trade relations were established.

== History ==
=== Early trade ===
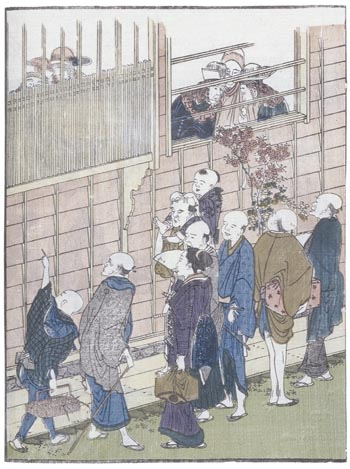
Curious Japanese watching Dutchmen in the Nagasakiya in Edo

In April 1600, the ship "de Liefde" arrived on the coast of Bungo (present-day Usuki), with a dwindled, exhausted and sickly crew of survivors, the only ship remaining of the initial five vessels that departed from Rotterdam in 1598. This crew included Jacob Quaeckernaeck, Melchior van Santvoort, Jan Joosten and William Adams. The crew and ship's contents were seized under orders from Tokugawa Ieyasu, the ruler at the time, and upon extracting information from some of the members brought to court about foreign affairs and the purpose of their mission, he permitted some to ship out on Red Seal Ships, thus starting the first trading collaborations between the Dutch and the Japanese.

When formal trade relations were established in 1609 at the behest of William Adams, the Dutch were granted extensive trading rights and established a trading outpost at Hirado, operated by the Dutch East India Company. They traded in Asian goods such as spices, textiles, porcelain, and silk.

In 1637, the Shimabara uprising broke out following a revolt by peasants, farmers and hidden Christians against the Tokugawa shogunate. What began as resistance to heavy taxation and local abuses—including the alleged seizure and torture of a farmer's daughter for tax arrears—quickly escalated into a broader rebellion in which Christian believers and impoverished farmers allied against the shogunate. Fearing that the revolt might inspire similar uprisings elsewhere in the country, the shogunate adopted an increasingly intolerant stance toward Christianity.

Although reluctant to become involved, the Dutch were ordered by the shogunate to assist in suppressing the rebellion in order to preserve their trading privileges. They complied by using a ship to bombard the besieged castle, though this assistance had little practical effect. In the aftermath, all Christian nations that had supported the rebels were expelled, leaving the Dutch as the sole remaining commercial partner from the West.

Consequently, during the isolationist period known as Sakoku, the shogunate removed Dutch trade from the control of the Hirado domain and relocated the entire Dutch trading post segregated away from Japanese society to the artificial island of Dejima, where commercial activities were subjected to strict supervision, under scrutiny and tight regulation. Though commercial partners, the Dutch were not allowed to set foot in Japan, and the Japanese were not to enter Dejima. This artificial island had become the only meeting point between the Dutch and Japanese authorities.

=== Military cooperation ===
After the forcible opening of Japan by an American fleet commanded by Commodore Perry in 1854, the Netherlands was one of five countries to conclude a treaty with Japan in 1858, the so-called Ansei Treaties.

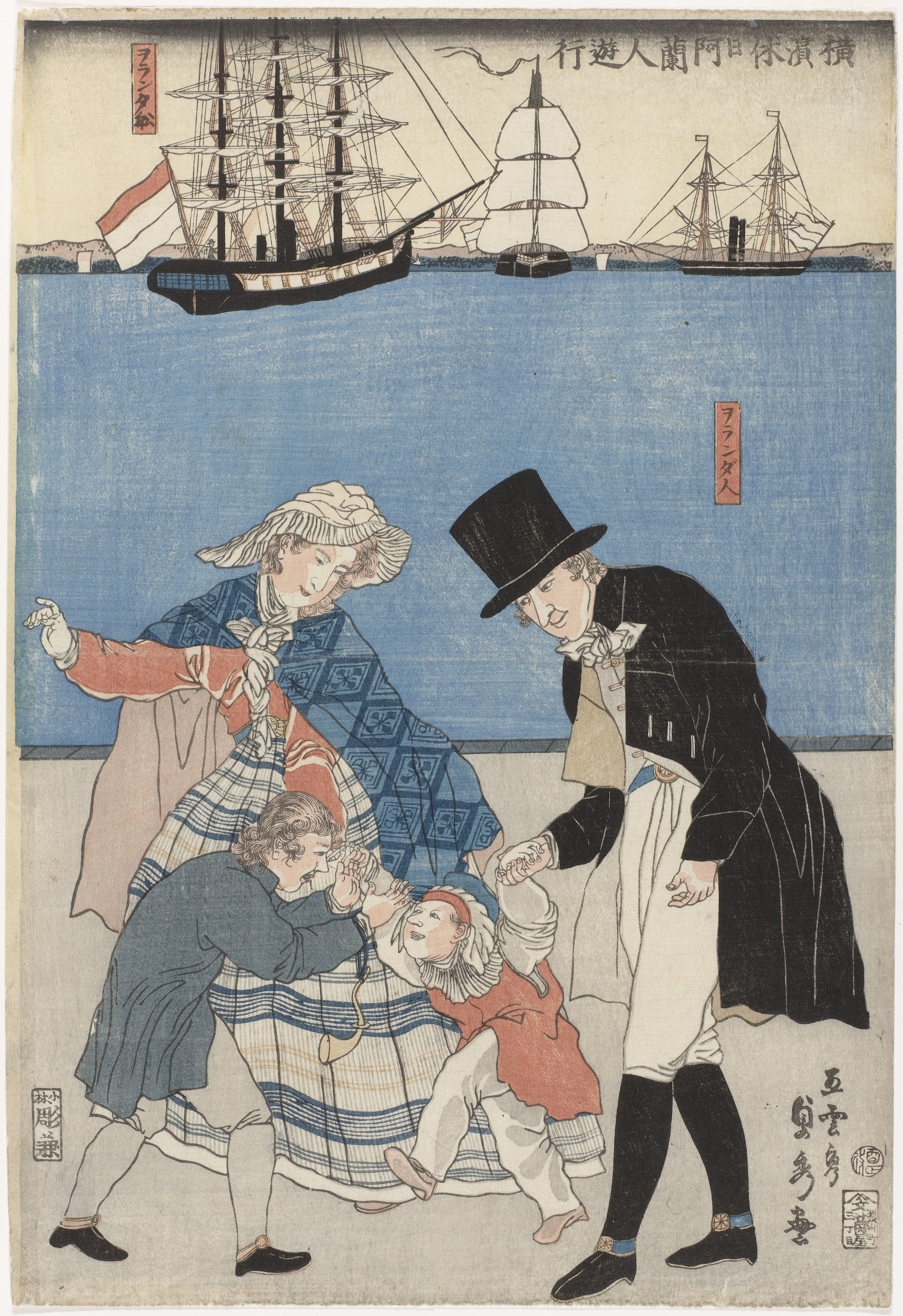
Dutch family in Yokohama, 1861

In 1860s, the Tokugawa Shogunate decided to modernize the Japanese fleet. To do this, orders were placed for modern steam powered warships. The first of which was the ZM SS Soembing, a gift from King William III of the Netherlands, which was renamed the Kankō Maru. To train Japanese sailors in the use of these new and powerful ships the Nagasaki Naval Training Center was established at the entrance of Dejima, to maximize interaction with Dutch naval know-how. Among the students at the Nagasaki Naval Training Center was Enomoto Takeaki, one of the founders of the Imperial Japanese Navy. Following the opening of Japan to trade, the Dutch special mission in Nagasaki was closed down in 1860 and first Dutch Consulate was opened in Edo.

=== World War II ===
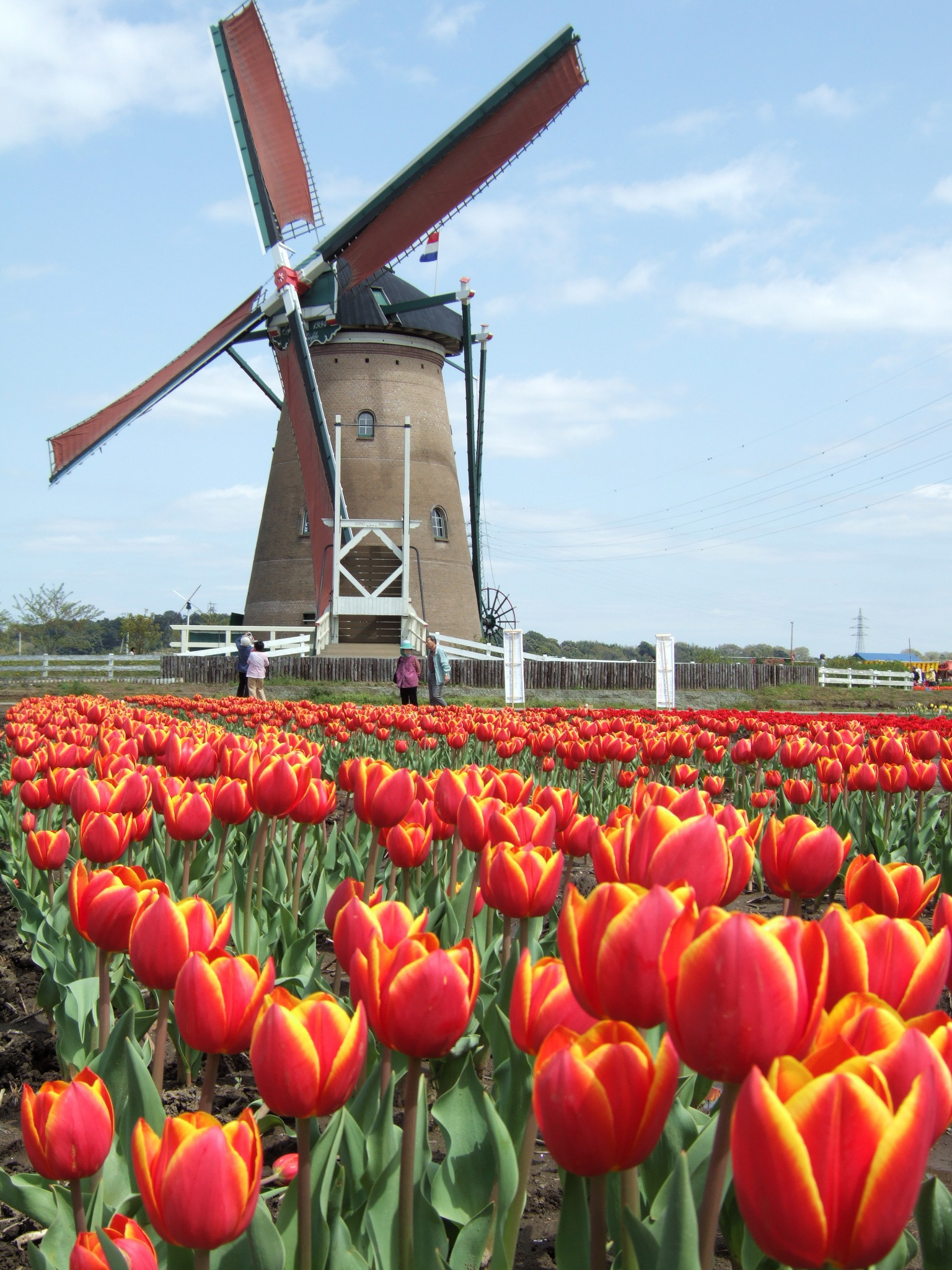
A replica 18th century Dutch windmill fabricated in the Netherlands and then assembled on the shore of Lake Imba near Sakura, Japan in 1994, named in honour of 'The Love' (De Liefde), the first Dutch sailing vessel to reach Japan in 1600. Also notable are the many tulips on the foreground.

=== Post war Japanese–Dutch relations ===
The relations between Japan and the Netherlands after 1945 have been complicated. The invasion and occupation of the Netherlands East Indies during World War II, brought about the destruction of the colonial state in Indonesia, as the Japanese removed as much of the Dutch government as they could, weakening the post war grip the Netherlands had over the territory. Under diplomatic pressure from the United States, the Netherlands recognised Indonesian sovereignty in 1949 (see United States of Indonesia).

Emperor Hirohito landed in the Netherlands for a state visit on 8 October 1971. The visit was controversial because of the World War II troubles, and his delegation had to be protected from protesters. Japanese flags were burned by radical far-left activists of the Red Youth in front of the media and a bomb alert was reported when the Japanese embassy was threatened. The Japanese press reacted furiously to the reception. After the visit, the Dutch government repeatedly apologised to Japan, and the mood in Japan turned positive when Hirohito called the visit a "success."

Increasingly positive relations were largely felt in the consumer electronics industry, where the Netherlands's Philips and Japan's Sony - both major electronics companies at the time - worked together in making several popular mass market technologies such as the compact disc (CD).

On the 24 August 2009, the Netherlands released a commemorative 5 euro coin to celebrate 400 years of relations.

== Education ==
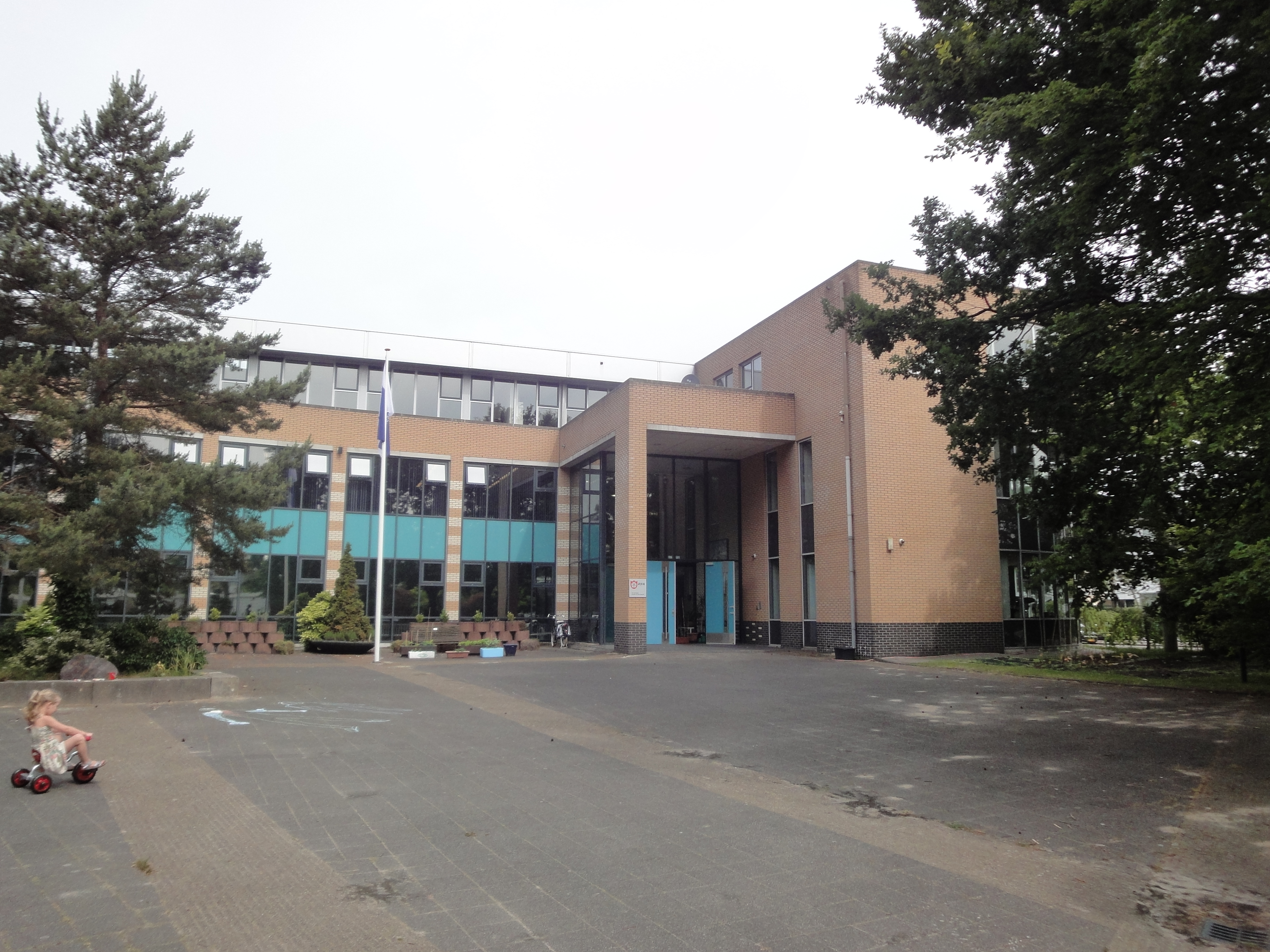
The Japanese School of Rotterdam

Amsterdam has one Japanese-medium day school, the Japanese School of Amsterdam. There is also a school in Rotterdam, the Japanese School of Rotterdam.

The Saturday Japanese supplementary schools in the Netherlands include Japanese Saturday School Amsterdam, Den Haag-Rotterdam Japanese Saturday School in Rotterdam, Stichting the Japanese School of Tilburg, and Stichting Maastricht Japanese Supplementary School. The Maastricht school was founded in 1992 as an outgrowth of the Joppenhoff International School. It began with 15 students, and grew as large as 30, but declined in concert with the economy, and as of 2004 enrolled just 20 students. The Saturday School of The Hague and Rotterdam was formed in 1996 from a merger of the two separate Saturday Japanese schools of those cities.

== Diplomacy ==
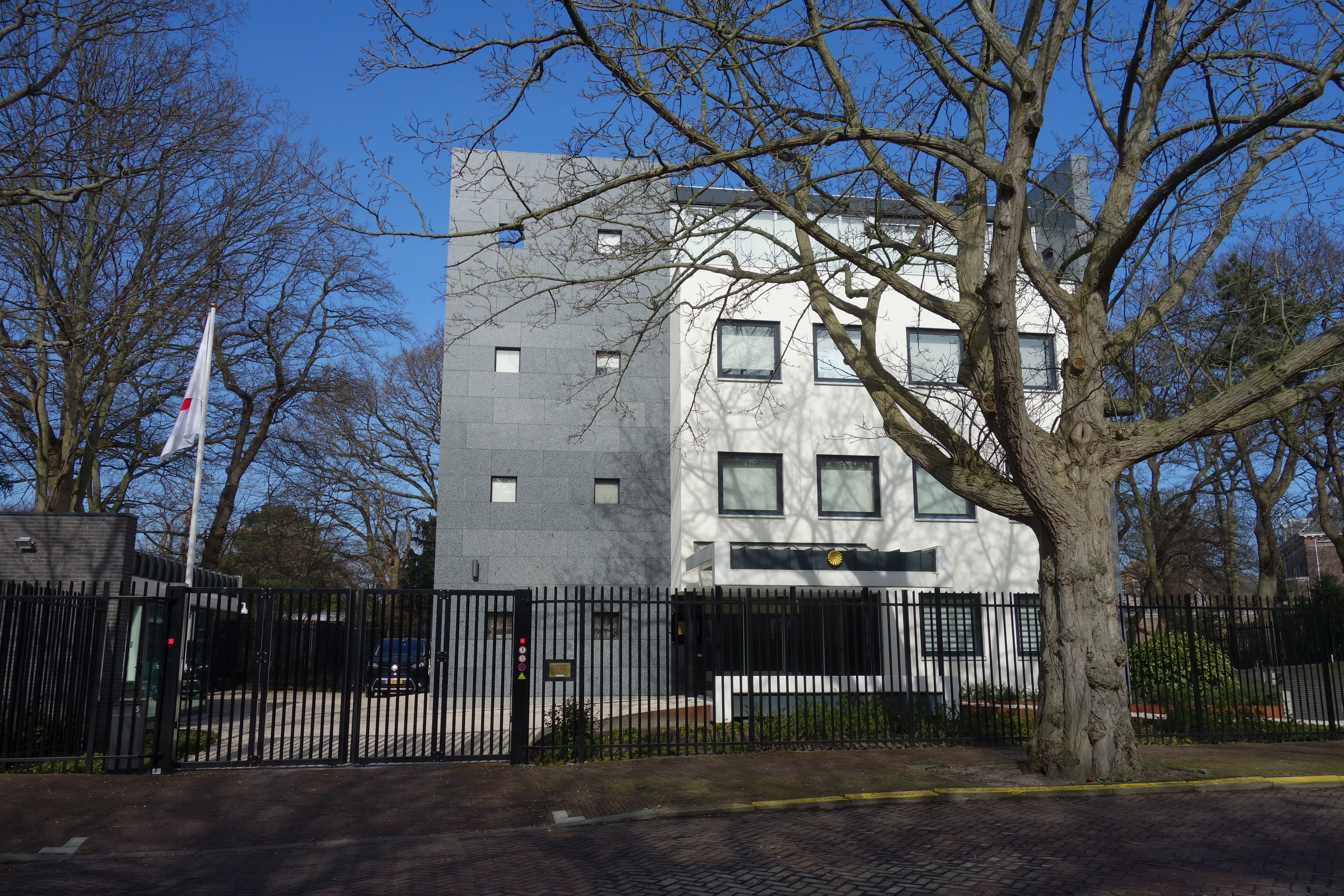
Embassy of Japan in The Hague

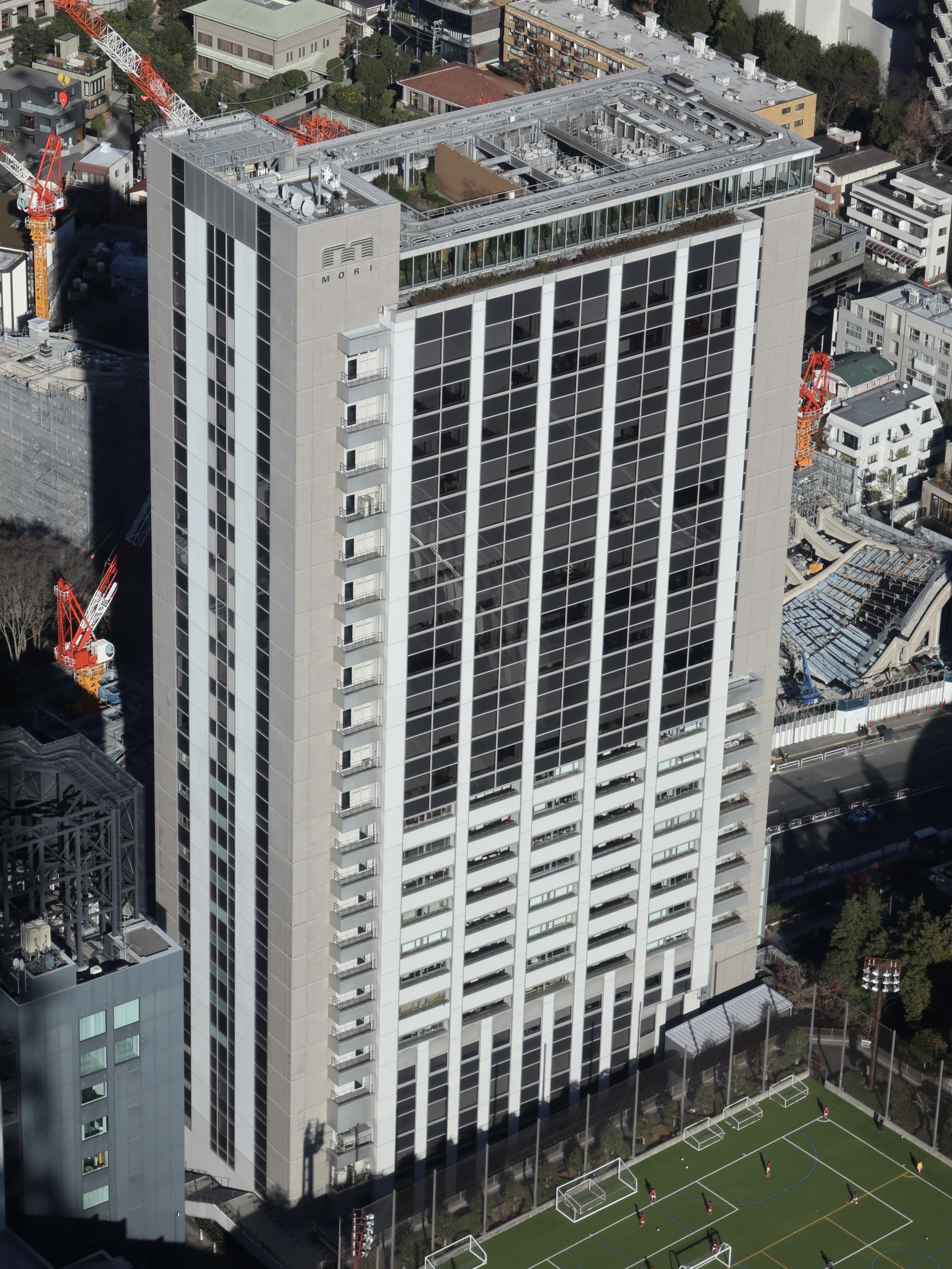
Holland Hills building, and embassy in the foreground

Japan has an embassy in The Hague. The Netherlands has an embassy in Tokyo and a Consulate-general in Osaka.

== See also ==
- Foreign relations of Japan
- Foreign relations of the Netherlands
- Dutch Empire
- Huis Ten Bosch
- Japanese people in the Netherlands
- Japan-Netherlands Institute
