= JPP (disambiguation) =

JPP is a group of Finnish folk musicians, formerly called Järvelän Pikkupelimannit.

JPP may also refer to:

== People ==
- Jean Casimir-Perier (1847–1907), President of France from 1894 to 1895
- Jean-Pierre Pernaut (1950-2022), French news reader and broadcaster
- Jean-Pierre Papin (born 1963), French former football player
- Jason Pierre-Paul (born 1989), American football defensive end, primarily with the New York Giants

== Politics ==
- Japan Progressive Party
- Jharkhand People's Party, a political party in India
- Together for the People (Portuguese: Juntos pelo Povo), a Portuguese political party

== Other ==
- Jaipur Pink Panthers, an Indian kabaddi team
- James Price Point, a headland in the Kimberley Region of Western Australia
- Japan Prizewinners Programme, an award for Dutch graduates in Japan
- Japan Pulp and Paper Company
- The Joe Perry Project, an American rock band formed by Aerosmith lead guitarist Joe Perry
- Journal of Pediatric Psychology
- Journal of Porphyrins and Phthalocyanines
- JPP Development Committee, involved in the JUMP geographic information system
