= Japanese barque Kankō Maru =

1852 Japanese steam-powered warship

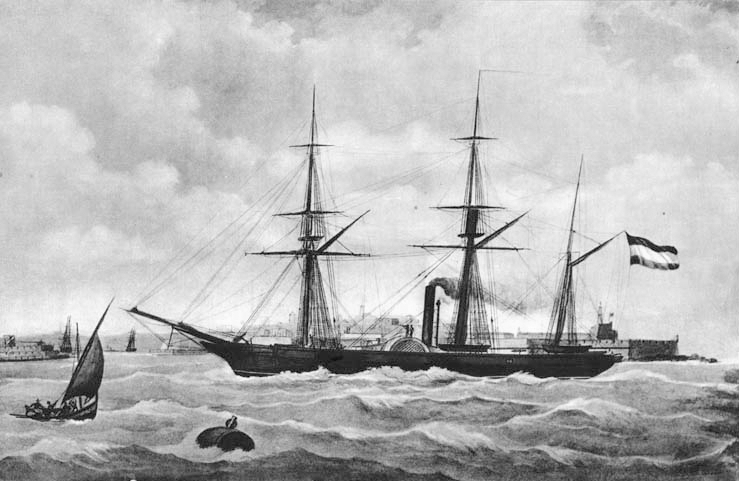
- Kankō Maru, Japan's first steam warship, 1855

History

Netherlands
- Name: Soembing
- Owner: Royal Netherlands Navy
- Builder: Amsterdam Naval Yards
- Laid down: 25 October 1850
- Launched: 9 June 1852
- Commissioned: 21 February 1853
- Fate: Presented to Japan 1855

Empire of Japan
- Name: Kankō Maru
- Acquired: 25 August 1855
- Decommissioned: March 1876
- Fate: Scrapped 1876

General characteristics
- Displacement: 781 t (769 long tons)
- Length: 66 m (216 ft 6 in) o/a
- Beam: 9.1 m (29 ft 10 in)
- Draught: 4.2 m (13 ft 9 in)
- Propulsion: Coal-fired steam engine, 150 hp (110 kW)
- Sail plan: Jackass-barque-rigged
- Armament: 1 × 60 pdr muzzle-loading gun, 2 × 30 pdr long barrel muzzle-loading gun, 1 × 30 pdr muzzle-loading gun

Kankō Maru (観光丸; Vision) was Japan's first steam-powered warship. It was presented to the Tokugawa shogunate ruling Japan during the Bakumatsu period as a gift from King William III of the Netherlands to assist Janus Henricus Donker Curtius, head of the Nederlandsche Handel-Maatschappij (Netherlands Trading Society) in Japan in his efforts to establish formal diplomatic relations and the opening of Japanese ports to Dutch merchant vessels.

== Background ==
Since the beginning of the seventeenth century, the Tokugawa shogunate ruling Japan pursued a policy of isolating the country from outside influences. Foreign trade was maintained only with the Dutch and the Chinese and was conducted exclusively at Nagasaki under a strict government monopoly. No foreigners were allowed to set foot in Japan, and no Japanese was permitted to travel abroad. In June 1635, a law was proclaimed prohibiting the construction of large, ocean-capable vessels. However, by the early nineteenth century, this policy of isolation was increasingly under challenge. In 1844, King William II of the Netherlands sent a letter urging Japan to end the isolation policy on its own before change would be forced from the outside.

Following the July 1853 visit of Commodore Perry, an intense debate erupted within the Japanese government on how to handle the unprecedented threat to the national's capital, and the only universal consensus was that steps be taken immediately to bolster Japan's coastal defenses. The law forbidding construction of large vessels was repealed, and many of the feudal domains took immediate steps to construct or purchase warships. However, the ships produced within Japan were based on reverse-engineering of designs some decades old, and the ships were already obsolete by the time of their completion. The need for steam-powered warships to match the foreign "Black Ships" was a pressing issue, and the Tokugawa shogunate approached the Dutch for the supply of such vessels.

Aware that it would take time to either construct or purchase ships from overseas, Donker Curtius asked for one of the warships of the Royal Netherlands Navy stationed in the Netherlands East Indies to be presented to the Japanese government.

The Dutch warship named Soembing (スームビング), the name of a volcano on Java, was sent with Naval captain Gerhardus Fabius to introduce the Japanese to navigation techniques in 1854, and the ship was formally presented to the government of shōgun Tokugawa Iesada at Nagasaki in the name of the Dutch King, Willem III in 1855. The gift was the subject of heated debates within the Dutch government, as many ministers felt that the expense was too great. She was renamed Kankō Maru (観光丸), after a line in the I Ching : Kankoku shi kō (觀國之光, to view the light of the country).

== Design ==
Kankō Maru was a three-masted jackass-barque-rigged sailing vessel, with an auxiliary single-cylinder coal-fired 150 horsepower (110 kW) reciprocating steam engine turning side paddlewheels. She had an overall length of 66.8 metres (219 ft 2 in) and a displacement of 781 tons. Her armament consisted of six muzzle-loading cannon.

== Operational history ==
Kankō Maru was assigned to be a training ship to the newly formed Nagasaki Naval Training Center, under Nagai Naoyuki. At this time, 22 Dutch sailors, including Lieutenant G. C. C. Pels Rijcken provided training, and this training was continued by Lieutenant H. van Kattendijke who arrived in Japan on Kanrin Maru. This was the first time that the Japanese had received formal military training from the Dutch.

She was then transferred to the new Tsukiji Naval Training Center in Edo in April 1857, with a Japanese-only crew of 103 students.

Following the Meiji Restoration, she was taken over by the Meiji government on 28 April 1868 and became one of the first ships of the fledgling Imperial Japanese Navy. She remained based at the Imperial Japanese Naval Academy at Tsukiji until she was scrapped in 1876.

=== Replica ===
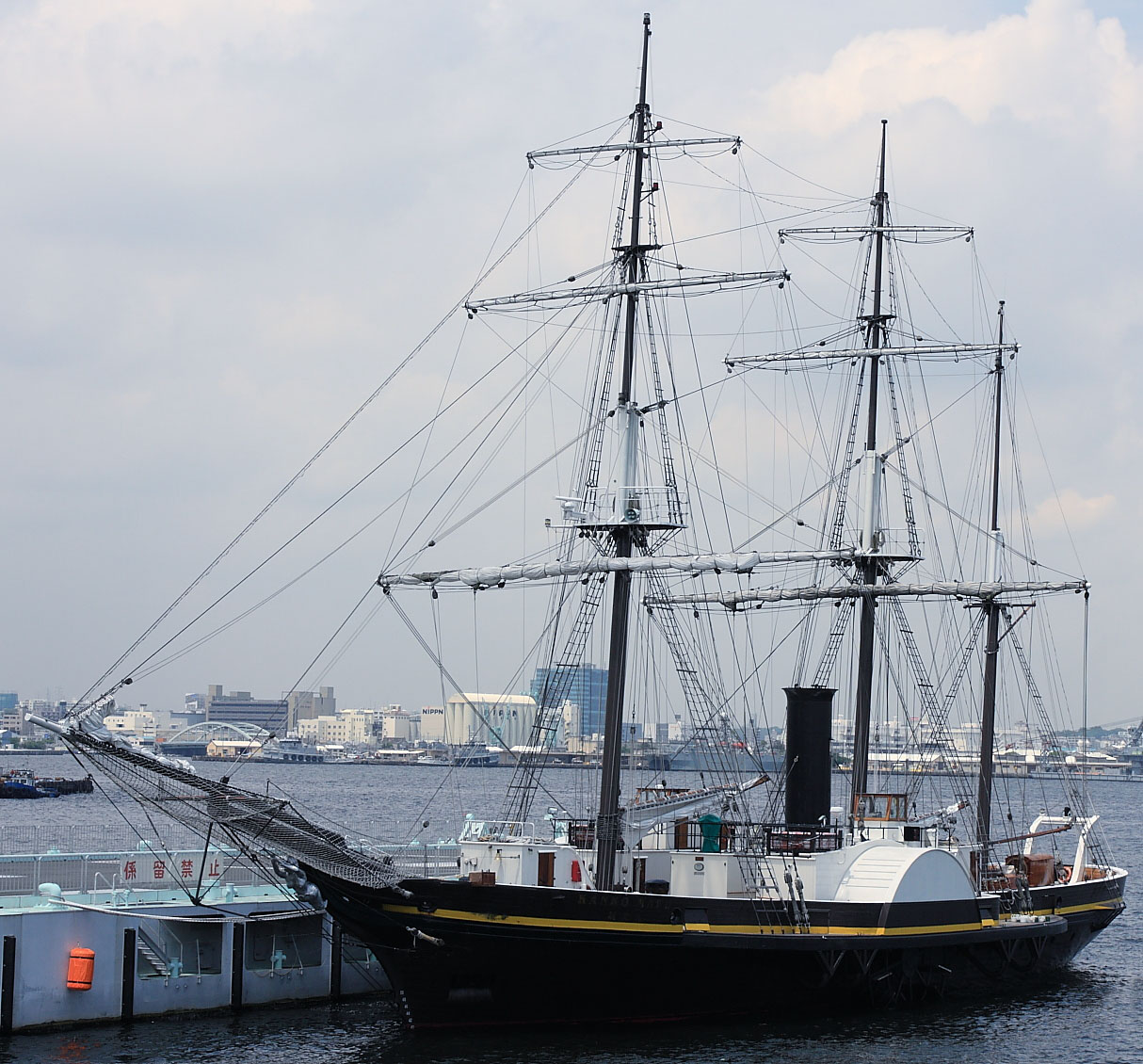
Kankō Maru (replica)

A faithful replica of the original Kankō Maru was built at the Verolme Shipyards in the Netherlands in 1987 based on the original plans for the Soembing preserved at the National Maritime Museum in Amsterdam. She was used as a tourism ship in the Huis Ten Bosch theme park in Sasebo, Nagasaki, and has been sailing along the coast of Japan since. The ship requires a 14-man crew, and can carry up to 300 passengers on short day cruises.

=== Spaceship project ===
Kankoh-maru is also the name of a proposed Japanese spaceship concept for space tourism.
