= Pels Rijcken =

Dutch Navy officer and politician

Gerhard Christiaan Coenraad (Gerrit) Pels Rijcken
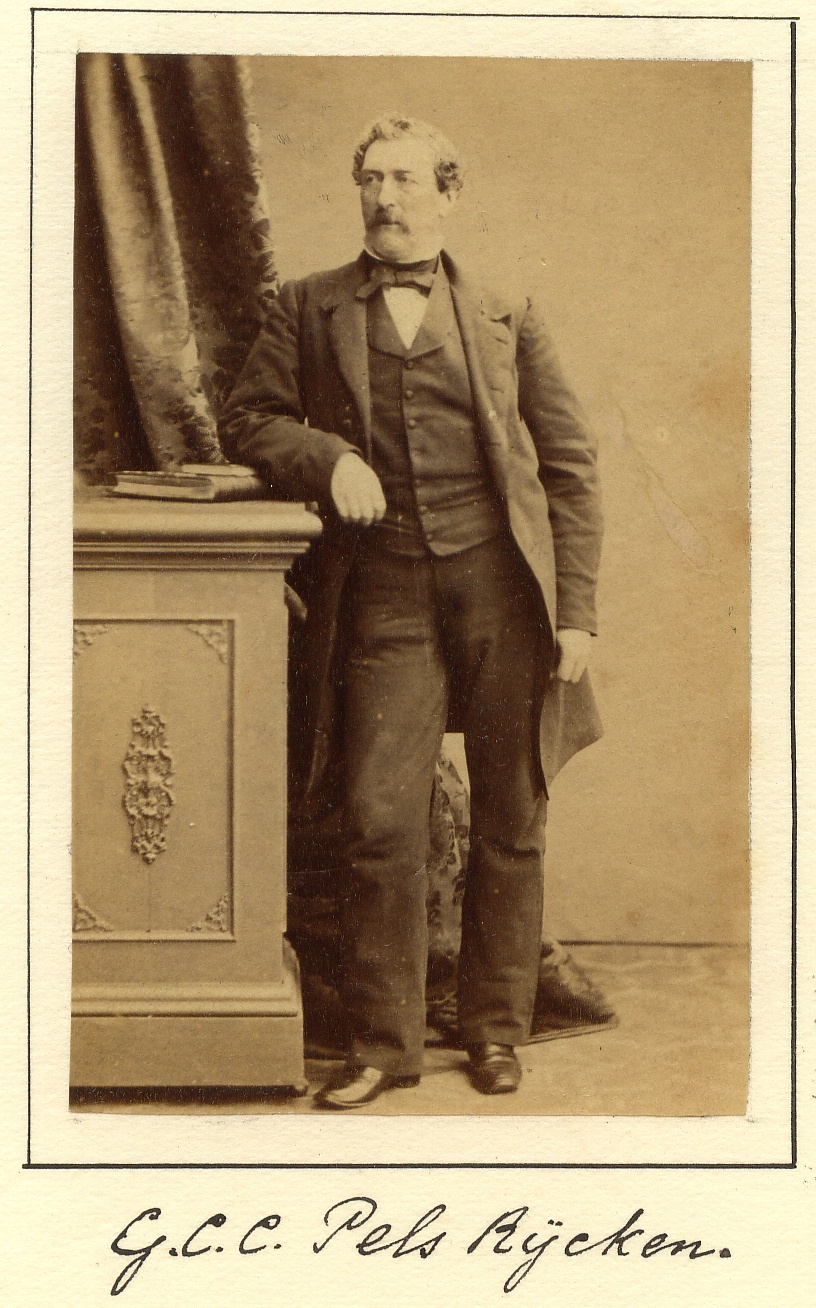
- Captain Pels Rijcken in 1860
- Born: 10 January 1810; Princenhage, Netherlands
- Died: 2 May 1889 (aged 79) Breda, Netherlands
- Allegiance: Netherlands
- Branch: Royal Netherlands Navy
- Service years: 1826–1868
- Rank: Vice Admiral
- Other work: Minister of the Navy

Gerhard Christiaan Coenraad (Gerrit) Pels Rijcken (10 January 1810 – 2 May 1889) was a career officer of the Royal Dutch Navy and a politician. As an officer, Pels Rijcken reached the rank of Vice-Admiral. He was Dutch Navy Minister from 1866 to 1868.

== Biography ==
Pels Rijcken was born in Princenhage, Netherlands, where his father was sheriff as well as an alderman of nearby Breda. His brother later became mayor of Arnhem (1874-1844). He entered the Royal Dutch Navy, becoming a midshipman in 1826, and rose through the ranks by serving on several vessels. He became a lieutenant, 2nd class in April 1831 and was promoted to lieutenant, 1st class in December 1845. He served as a training officer at the KIM (Royal Naval Institute) in Medemblik from 1847.

From 1855 to 1857, Pels Rijcken was assigned as commandant of the Nagasaki Naval Training Center, teaching the principles of a modern naval science (navigation, cannonry, ship-handling) to samurai including Katsu Kaishu. He arrived as captain of the Gedeh which accompanied the steam warship, the ZM SS Soembing, a gift from King William III of the Netherlands to Shōgun Tokugawa Iesada. Under the name of Kankō Maru, Soembing was used at the Nagasaki Naval Training Center as a training vessel. While in Japan, he was promoted to commander in May 1856. He was succeeded in this post by Willem Huyssen van Kattendijke from 1857 and returned to the Netherlands.

Pels Rijcken was promoted to captain in February 1861. On 1 June 1862 he was captain of the steamship Ardjoeno. From 1863 to 1864 he commanded the frigate Zeeland. He then was appointed as an adjutant to King William III, a post which he held until his death.

After his promotion to rear admiral and assignment as commandant of the naval base at Willemsoord from 1 July 1865 to 1 June 1866, Pels Rijcken was named Minister of the Navy in the cabinet of Prime Minister Julius van Zuylen van Nijevelt from 1 June 1866 to 4 June 1868. He was promoted to vice admiral on his retirement from active service on 1 August 1868.

After retirement, he ran unsuccessfully for public office in Amsterdam, but was defeated in the elections of 1869. He was also a candidate for Minister of the Navy in 1874, but was rejected for showing symptoms of senility during his interviews. He died in Breda in 1889.

== Honors and decorations ==
- – Commander of the Order of the Netherlands Lion, August 15, 1867
- – Grand Cross Order of the Oak Crown, June 2, 1868
