= Nagai Naoyuki =

Japanese samurai

- 永井 尚志
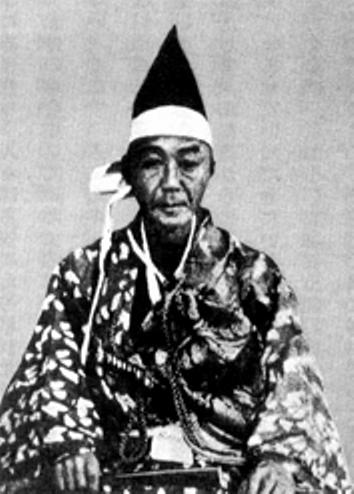
- Born: December 21, 1816; Mikawa, Japan
- Died: July 1, 1896 (aged 79); Tokyo, Japan
- Other names: Nagai Genba, Nagai Mondonoshō

Nagai Naoyuki (永井 尚志; December 21, 1816 – July 1, 1896), also known as Nagai Genba (永井 玄蕃) or Nagai Mondonoshō (永井 主水正), was a Japanese hatamoto under the Tokugawa of Bakumatsu period Japan.

His great-great-grandchild was Yukio Mishima. Naoyuki's adopted son, Iwanojō Nagai, was the father of Natsu, who was Mishima's grandmother. Iwanojō's real father was Nagasumi Miyoshi (Miyoshi clan) who was a Tokugawa retainer.

== Early life ==
Nagai Naoyuki, or as he was first known, Matsudaira Iwanojō (松平 岩之丞), was born in the Nukada district of the Okutono Domain by a concubine to daimyō Matsudaira Noritada (松平 乗尹). Noritada, while head of a collateral branch of the Tokugawa clan, was not classified as shinpan, like the Matsudaira of Aizu, but was instead a fudai daimyo. Iwanojō, Noritada's second son, lost his father at the age of three. Subsequently, he was moved to Edo, to the Okutono domain's main residence in Azabu, where he was in the care of his adoptive brother, Matsudaira Noriyoshi (松平 乗羨), before being adopted by 2000 koku Tokugawa hatamoto Nagai Naonori at the age of 25. Following his adoption he took the adult name of Naoyuki (also read "Naomune").

== Career ==
After completing a thorough education in literature, art, and military training, Nagai entered the ranks of the Tokugawa bureaucracy. He served from 1851 to 1852 as an instructor at the Kitenkan, a branch of the Shogunate's Shoheizaka academy, located in Kōfu, Kai Province. Shortly after the arrival of the Perry Expedition challenging Japan national isolation policy, Nagai was appointed as a metsuke and was placed in charge of casting new cannons for coastal defense.

In 1855, Nagai was transferred to the newly formed Nagasaki Naval Training Center, where he served as its director, overseeing a group of Dutch military advisors and students from various domains around Japan in studies of western warship technologies. Katsu Kaishū later credited Nagai for much of the training center's progress, as well as the construction of the Nagasaki Iron Works, and one of its training ships, the Kottoru. In 1857, with the opening of the Tsukiji Naval Training Center, Nagai returned to Edo on board the Kankō Maru, Japan's first steam warship, together with 103 of his students.

In December 1857, Nagai was appointed Kanjō-bugyō. In July 1858, Nagai (along with Iwase Tadanari) was appointed one of the first Gaikoku bugyō (Commissioner for Foreign Affairs). He served from August 1858 through March 1859., during which time the difficult negotiations for the Ansei Treaties took place with the United States, United Kingdom, Russia and France. In February 1859, he added Gunkan-bugyō to his list of titles. However, in August, following the death of Shōgun Tokugawa Iesada, Nagai was purged from office by the Tairō Ii Naosuke for his support of the Hitotsubashi faction over the Kishu faction for the shogunal succession.

After Ii's assassination, Nagai was recalled to public office and was appointed to serve as one of the city magistrates of Kyoto (Kyoto Higashimachi-bugyō) from August 1862 through March 1864. This was a difficult and violent period in Kyoto, with many daimyo establishing residences in Kyoto and maneuvering for political connections with various of the nobility. The city was filled with numerous rōnin, many of whom supported the sonnō jōi movement and who did not hesitate to use assassination or terrorist tactics to further their political agenda. During his tenure, the Shinsengumi became active in Kyoto.

Following his two-year stint in the capital, he was made ōmetsuke from March 1864 through May 1865. He served again as Gaikoku bugyō from November 1865 through April 1867. Nagai was promoted to the position of wakadoshiyori-kaku (aide to the junior counselors) from April 1867 through January 1868 and was in Kyoto on November 9, 1867 when Shōgun Tokugawa Yoshinobu formally surrendered his office; thereafter, Nagai served as one of the wakadoshiyori from January to March 1868 when the Meiji Restoration signaled the end of the Tokugawa shogunate.

== Under the Ezo Republic ==
Returning to Edo following the Battle of Toba–Fushimi, Nagai joined Enomoto Takeaki and the remnants of the Tokugawa navy, boarding the Kaiten and heading to Ezo by way of Matsushima, in Sendai Domain. In Hokkaido, Nagai was chosen to be one of the city magistrates of Hakodate by the new Ezo Republic. However, the Imperial Army soon began its attack on Hokkaido, and Nagai surrendered at the small fortress of Benten Daiba, along with the survivors of the Shinsengumi. He attempted to commit seppuku, but was stopped by those surrounding him.

== Later life ==
After a period of three years in prison, he was pardoned by the Meiji government in January 1871, and again rose to positions of political prominence, serving most notably as the secretary to the Genrōin from July 1875 to October 1876. He died in July 1891.

One of his descendants, through his adopted son Iwanojō, was the famous author Yukio Mishima.

== See also ==
- Gaikoku bugyō, commissioners appointed to oversee trade and diplomatic relations with foreign countries
