= Ronald Hanson =

Dutch physicist

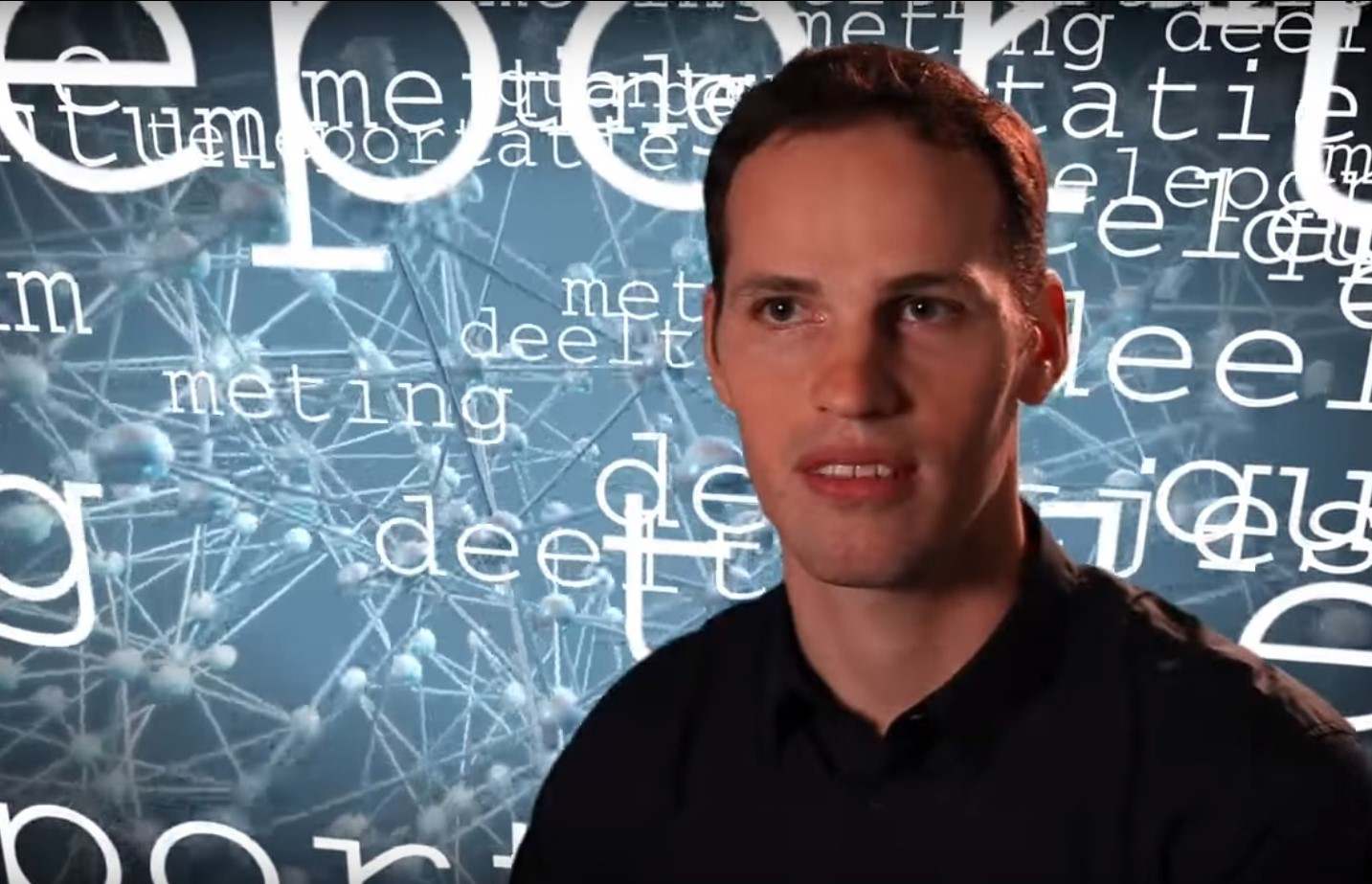
- Hanson in 2015
- Born: 20 November 1976 (age 49)
- Education: University of Groningen (MSc 1999); Delft University of Technology (PhD 2005)
- Awards: John Stewart Bell Prize (2017) Spinoza Prize (2019)
- Scientific career
- Fields: Quantum communication, quantum networks, condensed-matter physics, quantum information, quantum optics

Ronald Hanson (born 20 November 1976) is a Dutch experimental physicist. He is best known for his work on the foundations and applications of quantum entanglement. He is a Professor at the Kavli Institute of Nanoscience at Delft University of Technology and scientific director of QuTech. the Dutch Quantum Institute for quantum computing and quantum internet, founded by Delft University of Technology and the Netherlands Organisation for Applied Research.

== Biography ==
Hanson graduated from the University of Groningen with a MSc degree in applied physics. He was recruited for the Japan Prizewinners Programme, a one-year postgraduate course for outstanding Dutch graduates with a university master's degree. In 2005 he graduated in a PhD in physics from Delft University of Technology, supervised by Leo Kouwenhoven. During 2005–2007 he worked as a postdoctoral fellow at the University of California, Santa Barbara, supervised by David Awschalom. In 2007 he accepted an assistant professorship in Delft. He obtained full professorship in 2012.

Hanson is a co-founder of QuTech. He served as its first roadmap leader on Quantum Internet and Networked Computing from 2014 to 2017. In 2017 he was appointed Scientific Director of QuTech.

== Research ==
Hanson's PhD work pioneered control of electron spins in semiconductor quantum dots, laying groundwork for later progress towards scalable quantum computer architectures. Hanson's work since 2006 focuses on controlling single electron spins, single nuclear spins and single photons using diamond defect centers. In 2014, he achieved the first reliable teleportation of a quantum data from one chip to another, ref. 27 and ref. 28. In 2015, he reported the first loophole-free Bell inequality violation. Both Science and Nature put this work in their list of top science breakthroughs of 2015.

In 2017, Hanson realized distillation of quantum entanglement on a rudimentary two-node quantum network. In 2018, Hanson's group demonstrated the deterministic delivery of entanglement. This work showed faster generation than loss of entanglement between separaterate chips. Jointly with Stephanie Wehner and David Elkouss, Hanson has published a roadmap towards a future quantum Internet

== Memberships and affiliations ==
From 2010 until 2015, Hanson was elected member of De Jonge Akademie (the Young Academy) of the Royal Netherlands Academy of Arts and Sciences (KNAW).

In 2018, he became a member of the Koninklijke Hollandsche Maatschappij der Wetenschappen (KHMW).

In 2019 he was elected member of the KNAW.

== Awards ==
In 2019, Hanson was named one of the four winners of the Spinoza Prize. He is recipient of the John Stewart Bell Prize (2017), the Huibregtsen Award for Excellence in Science and Society (2016) and the KNAW Ammodo science award (2015), the Nicholas Kurti European Science Prize (2012) and the QIPC Young Investigator Award (2012).
