= Japanese people in the Netherlands =

Japanese people in the Netherlands Japanners in Nederland
- (Japan) (Netherlands)

Total population
- 10,460 (2024)

Regions with significant populations
- Amsterdam, Rotterdam, and Maastricht

Languages
- Dutch, Japanese, English

Religion
- See Religion in Japan

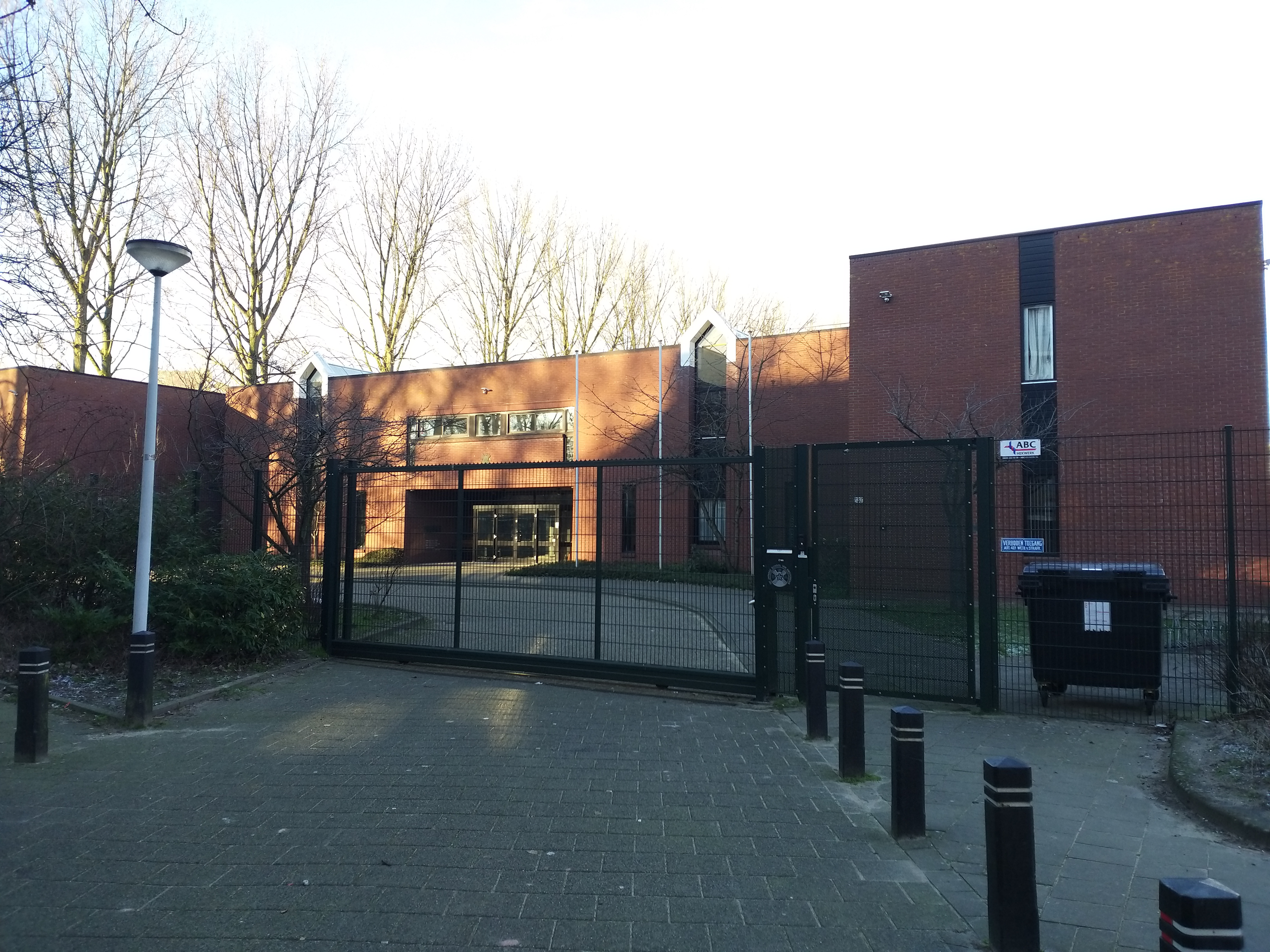
The Japanese School of Amsterdam

Japanese people in the Netherlands (Dutch: Japanners in Nederland) include expatriates from Japan and their descendants, as well as Dutch citizens of Japanese ancestry.

As of 2009, there were 7,524 persons of Japanese origin living in the Netherlands, according to the figures of the Statistics Netherlands office. In general, they are transient foreign residents employed by Japanese companies.

== Demography and distribution ==
According to a 1996 survey, 80% of Japanese in the Netherlands consisted of Japanese company employees and their families. Another 10% were Japanese civil servants on overseas postings, researchers, and students. The remainder were long-term residents, largely Japanese women married to Dutch men. Most live in Amsterdam. However, there are also about 150 living in Maastricht, mostly employees of Mitsubishi and their spouses and children.

Statistics Netherlands' 2009 figures with regards to persons of Japanese background show:

- 5,985 persons born in Japan (2,691 men, 3,294 women)
- 1,539 locally born persons of Japanese background (783 men, 756 women), of which:
  - 1,140 had one parent born outside of the Netherlands (582 men, 558 women)
  - 399 had both parents born outside of the Netherlands (201 men, 198 women)

For a total of 7,524 persons. This represented growth of about 2.4% over the previous year's total, and about 18% over the total for 1996, the earliest year for which statistics are made available. However, they still form only a minute proportion, little over two-tenths of a percent, of all persons of foreign background in the Netherlands.

== Education ==
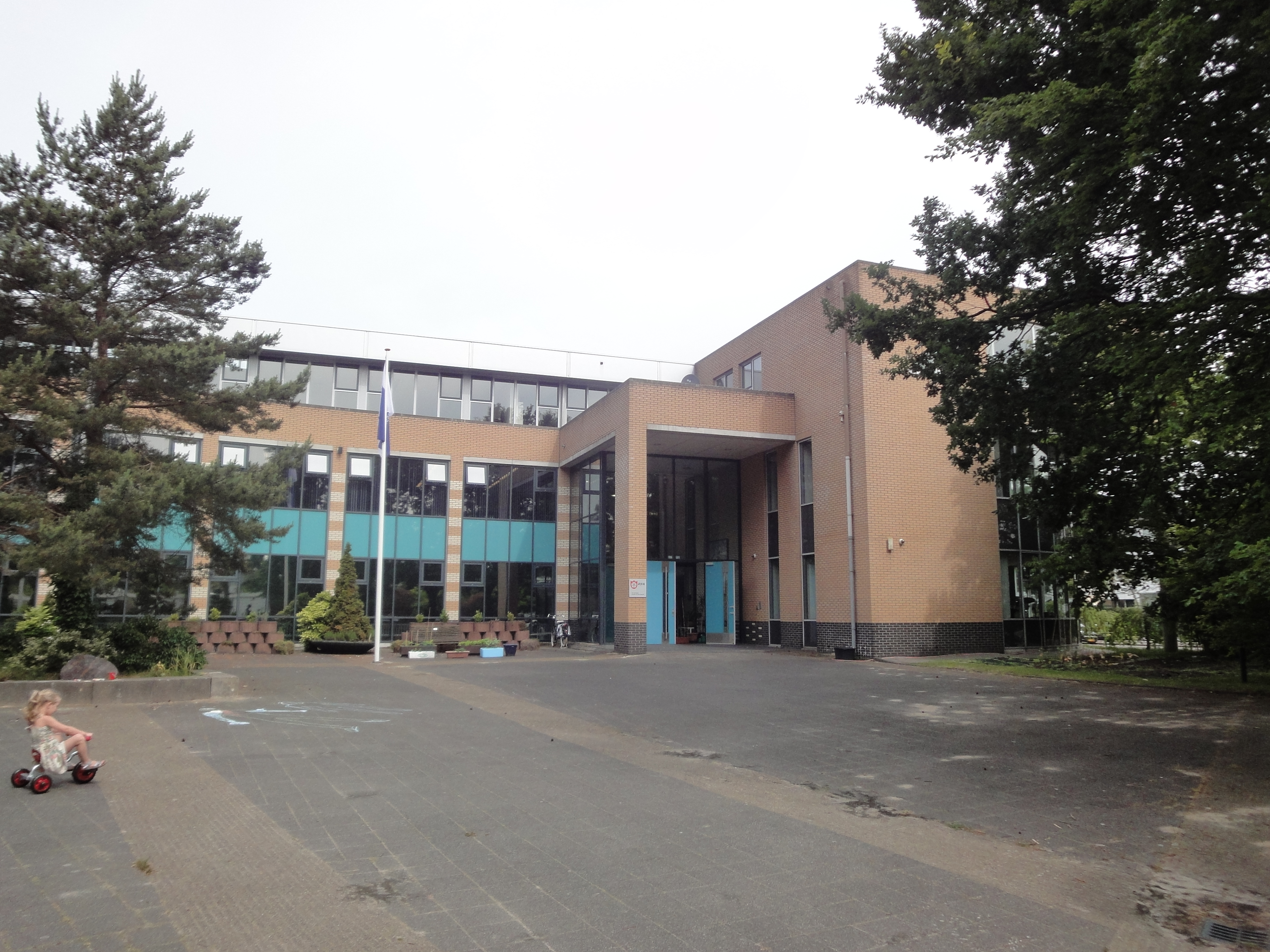
The Japanese School of Rotterdam

Locations of full-time and part-time Japanese schools in the Netherlands designated by the Japanese Ministry of Education

Amsterdam has one Japanese-medium day school, the Japanese School of Amsterdam. There is also the Japanese School of Rotterdam.

The Saturday Japanese supplementary schools in the Netherlands include: Japanese Saturday School Amsterdam (JSSA; アムステルダム日本語補習授業校 Amusuterdamu Nihongo Hoshū Jugyō Kō), The Hague-Rotterdam Japanese Saturday School (ハーグ・ロッテルダム日本語補習授業校 Hāgu Rotterudamu Nihongo Hoshū Jugyō Kō) in Rotterdam, Stichting the Japanese School of Tilburg (ティルブルグ日本語補習授業校 Tiruburugu Nihongo Hoshū Jugyō Kō), and Stichting Maastricht Japanese Supplementary School (ティルブルグ日本語補習授業校 Tiruburugu Nihongo Hoshū Jugyō Kō).

- The Maastricht school was founded in 1992 as an outgrowth of the Joppenhoff International School. It began with 15 students, and grew as large as 30, but declined in concert with the economy, and as of 2004 enrolled just 20 students. The Saturday School of The Hague and Rotterdam was formed in 1996 from a merger of the two separate Saturday Japanese schools of those cities.
- The Tilburg school is held at Beatrix College, and formerly at 2College.

== Employment ==
The workplace is one of the most important sites of cross-cultural encounters for Japanese working in the Netherlands. Japanese company offices in the Netherlands are generally small in size, numbering less than 100 employees. The decision-making processes in Japanese and Dutch corporate cultures are superficially similar, both relying on achieving consensus from stakeholders and subordinates rather than devolving decision-making authority to a single person. The need for Japanese expatriate middle-managers to refer plans back to headquarters in Japan, in addition to the emphasis on collective responsibility for the results of plans agreed to by consensus, means that decision-making in Japanese companies proceeds more slowly than in Dutch companies. Nevertheless, Dutch employees in Japanese companies perceive the decision-making process as achieving better and more thorough results despite its slow pace.

Japanese expatriate employees in the Netherlands put in longer hours than local employees. Dutch employees feel that their Japanese superiors and colleagues put in such long hours because they use their time inefficiently; furthermore, they feel little pressure to adopt those same working hours, asserting that the Japanese managers simply receive more benefits and salary in line with their increased responsibility. However, their Japanese colleagues resent this attitude, feeling that Dutch colleagues "leave work undone on their desk and go home", leaving it for the late-working Japanese to complete. Japanese managers find they have to delineate job requirements and responsibilities more explicitly for Dutch employees than they would for Japanese employees in Japan, due to the local cultural emphasis on individual responsibility above collective responsibility.

== Cuisine ==
As of 2000, when eating outside the home, Japanese expatriates in the Netherlands most commonly patronised Chinese restaurants (29% of meals eaten out); Japanese restaurants run a close second at 25%, Italian restaurants at 19%, and French restaurants at 10%. However, they derided the Japanese restaurants of the Netherlands as low-quality and expensive. They also cook Japanese food at home, though in a pattern different from that in Japan; they consumed less fish and more meat dishes (especially nikujaga), and often have to find substitutes for preferred vegetables which are unavailable locally. Preparing Japanese food was often viewed as troublesome due to these limitations, and many Japanese wives expressed that they only prepare such dishes because their husbands prefer them; when the husbands are away, they cook Western-style food instead. However, the community in Amsterdam at least had some Japanese-style grocery stores available locally. For the community in Maastricht, fewer such options were available; many crossed the border to Germany to do their shopping in Düsseldorf and took advantage of the many specialised grocery shops which have popped up to serve the city's significant Japanese community, or banded together and order groceries—especially fish prepared in the Japanese style—to be shipped down from Amsterdam. Another common option was to grow herb seasonings, especially garland chrysanthemum, perilla, and cryptotaenia, in one's own back garden.

== Notable individuals ==
- Saartje Specx (1617–1636), Dutch East India Company officer's daughter
- Cornelia van Nijenroode (1629 – c. 1692), merchant
- Teiko Kiwa (1902–1983), opera singer
- Hiromi Tojo (born 1947), martial artist and actor
- Mariko Peters (born 1969), politician and lawyer
- Aki Watano (born 1972), journalist and writer
- Kazuma Eekman (born 1989), contemporary artist
- Sai van Wermeskerken (born 1994), football player
- Kai Verbij (born 1994), speed skater
- Yuya Ikeshita (born 2002), football player

== See also ==
- Japan–Netherlands relations
- Japanese diaspora
- Immigration to the Netherlands
