= Kobe Naval Training Center =

Japanese naval training institute

Coordinates: 34°41′08.75″N 135°11′36.54″E

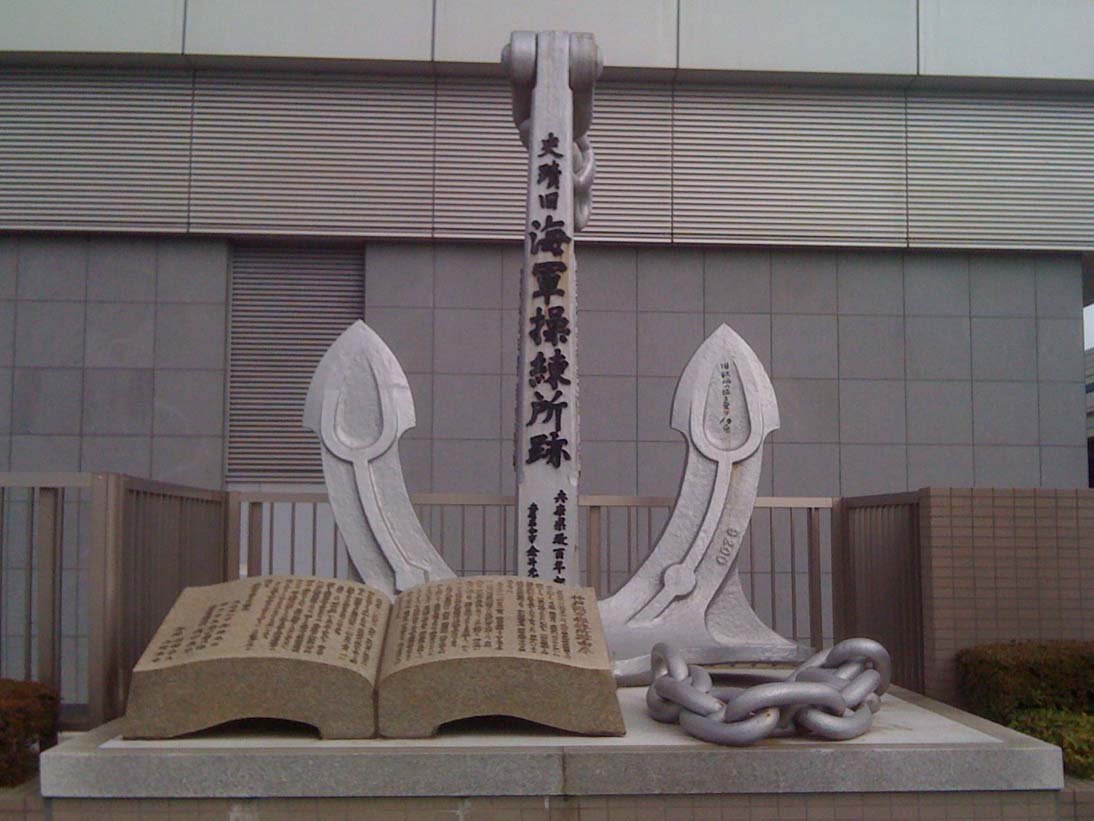
Monument marking the site of the Kobe Naval Training Center.

The Kobe Naval Training Center (神戸海軍操練所, Kobe Kaigun Sōren-jō) was a naval training institute in Bakumatsu period Japan, established by the Military Commissioner of the Tokugawa shogunate, Katsu Kaishū in May 1864, and dissolved in 1865.

== Institutional History ==
Following the closure of the Nagasaki Naval Training Center by his political opponents within the Tokugawa shogunate, Katsu Kaishū made a visit to the United States aboard the Japanese steamship Kanrin Maru, and returned even more determined that Japan needed to build a modern navy in order to prevent colonization by the Western imperialist powers. He obtained official permission to establish a training school at what was then the small fishing village of Kobe in Settsu Province with the three-fold purpose of creating an officer’s training academy, a shipyard for the construction of modern warships, and a modern seaport.

From the beginning, Katsu encountered opposition to his plans from within the shogunate, and as official funding was withheld, he was forced to support the center largely out of his own funds and the donations of a few sympathetic daimyō. The presence of a large number of pro-Sonnō jōi rōnin within the membership of the center also brought the project under suspicion, especially in the wake of the Kinmon Incident and the Ikedaya Incident (wherein one of its students, Mochizuki Kameyata of Tosa was among the jōi shishi casualties). The center was closed in mid-1865.

A number of students of the Kobe Naval Training Center subsequently went on to play a major role in the Meiji Restoration, including Sakamoto Ryōma, Mutsu Munemitsu and Itō Sukeyuki. Sakamoto and Mutsu would be later instrumental in the foundation of the Kaientai, a shipping company that would play a major part in bridging the alliance between the domains of Satsuma and Choshu. Indirectly, the activities of Sakamoto and the Kaientai would also influence Tosa trading official Iwasaki Yatarō in contributing to Japan's naval expansion–which became one of the central industries Mitsubishi (the company he will found) will be involved.

== See also ==
- Nagasaki Naval Training Center
