= Willem Huyssen van Kattendijke =

Dutch naval officer

Willem Johan Cornelis Huijssen van Kattendijke
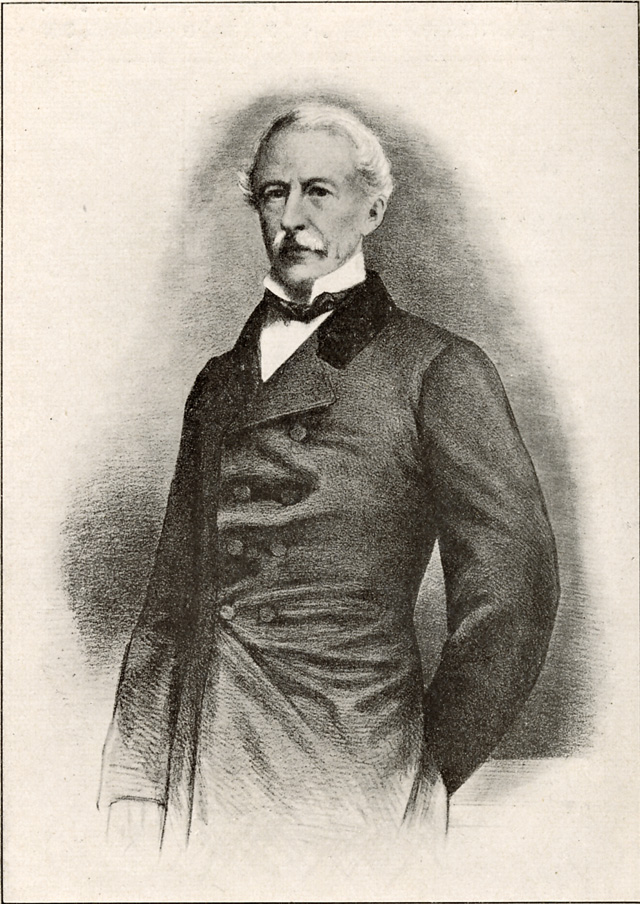
- Born: 22 January 1816; The Hague, Netherlands
- Died: 6 February 1866 (aged 50) The Hague, Netherlands
- Allegiance: Netherlands
- Branch: Royal Netherlands Navy
- Service years: 1839–1866
- Rank: Commander
- Other work: Minister of the Navy, Foreign Minister

Willem Johan Cornelis, Ridder Huijssen van Kattendijke (22 January 1816 – 6 February 1866) was a career officer of the Royal Dutch Navy and a politician. As an officer, he reached the rank of Commander. He was Dutch Naval Minister from 1861 to 1866, and interim Dutch Foreign Minister in 1864.

== Biography ==
van Kattendijke was born in Princenhage, Netherlands, as the son of Jan Willem Huyssen van Kattendijke, foreign minister of the Netherlands from 1841 to 1843. He entered the Royal Dutch Navy, becoming a midshipman in 1831, and attended the KIM (Royal Naval Institute) in Medemblik from 1831 to 1839. He became a lieutenant 2nd class in 1839 and served on various vessels until 1842. From 1842 to 1846, he was adjutant to the Director-General of the Navy, and from 1846 to 1849 an aide to the Minister of the Navy, and from 1846 to 1851 to King William III of the Netherlands. He was promoted to lieutenant-commander 1st class in January 1851.

In 1859, van Kattendijke replaced Pels Rijcken as commandant of the Nagasaki Naval Training Center, teaching the principles of a modern naval science (navigation, cannonry, ship-handling) to samurai including Katsu Kaishu. He arrived as captain of the Kanrin Maru, a steam warship that had been purchased by the ruling Tokugawa shogunate of Japan.

He was promoted to commander on 1 May 1858. On the closure of Nagasaki Naval Training Center in 1859, he returned to the Netherlands. In 1860 he published a memoir of his experiences in and around Nagasaki in 1857-59, the last years of the isolationist Sakoku policy. A Japanese translation of his memoir was published in 1964.

From 14 March 1861 until 6 February 1866 he was Navy Minister for the Netherlands, first in the cabinet of Jacob van Zuylen van Nijevelt and then in the second cabinet of Prime Minister Johan Rudolph Thorbecke. In the latter he also served as interim Foreign Minister from 2 January 1864 to 15 March 1864. He died in The Hague as Navy Minister at the age of 50.

== Honors and decorations ==
- - Commander of the Order of the Netherlands Lion

== See also ==
Political offices
Preceded by Johannes Servaas Lotsy	Minister of the Navy; 1861-1866	Succeeded by Johan Wilhelm Blanken (interim)
