= Japanese School of Rotterdam =

- ロッテルダム日本人学校; De Japanse School van Rotterdam
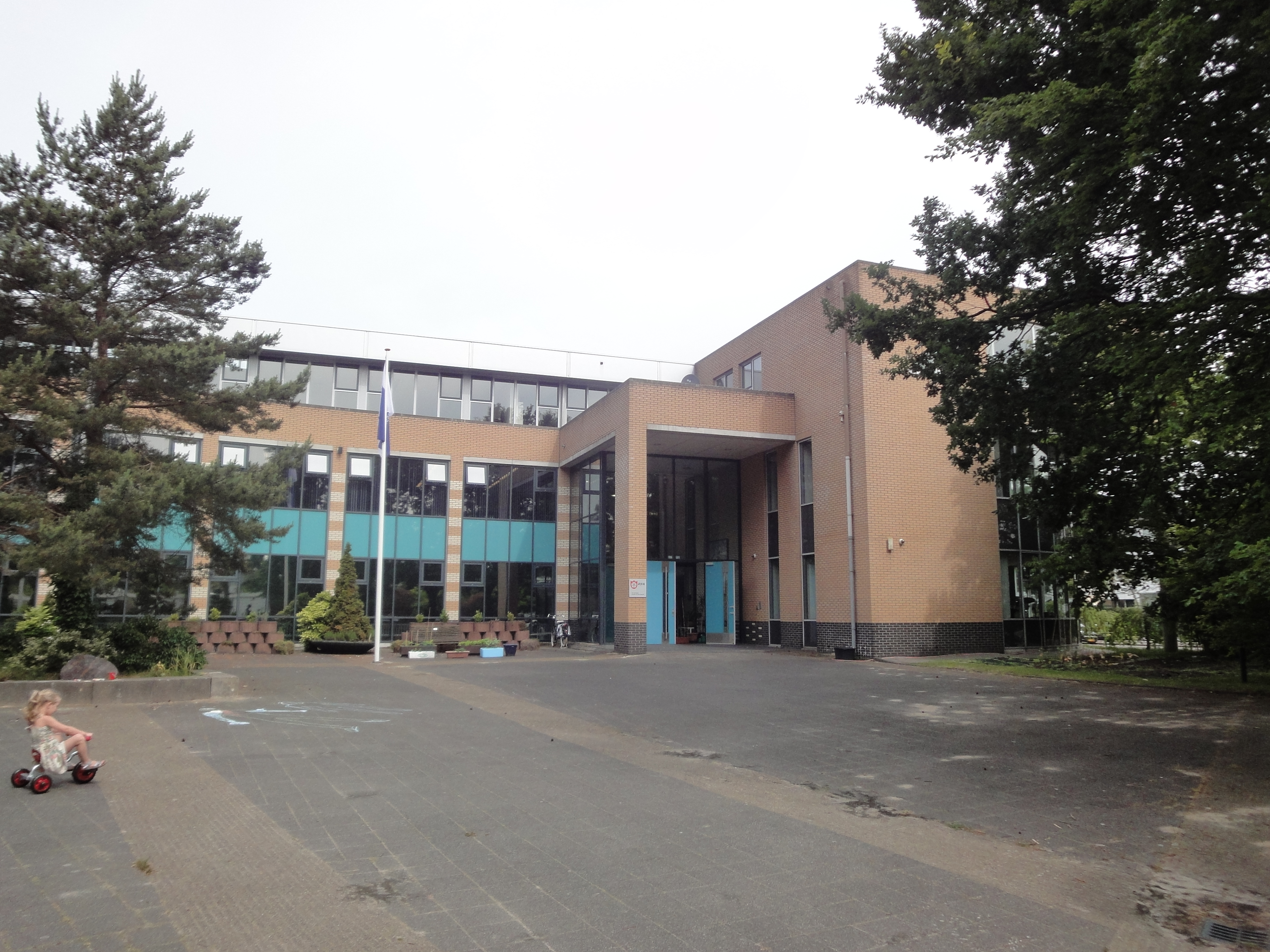

Location
- Verhulstlaan 19 3055WJ, Rotterdam; Rotterdam; Netherlands; 51°57′51″N 4°30′09″E

Information
- Type: Japanese international school
- Website: jsrotte.nl

The Japanese School of Rotterdam (Dutch: De Japanse School van Rotterdam, Japanese: ロッテルダム日本人学校 Rotterudamu Nihonjin Gakkō) is a Japanese international school in Hillegersberg, Rotterdam.

The Hague-Rotterdam Japanese Saturday School (ハーグ・ロッテルダム日本語補習授業校 Hāgu Rotterudamu Nihongo Hoshū Jugyō Kō), a Japanese Saturday school formed in 1996 by the merger of existing Saturday schools in The Hague and Rotterdam, holds its classes at the Rotterdam Japanese day school. The Saturday school rents from the day school and has done so since 2003.

== See also ==
- Japanese people in the Netherlands
- Japanese School of Amsterdam
- Japan–Netherlands relations
