= Nagasaki Naval Training Center =

Coordinates: 32°44′42.12″N 129°52′24.53″E

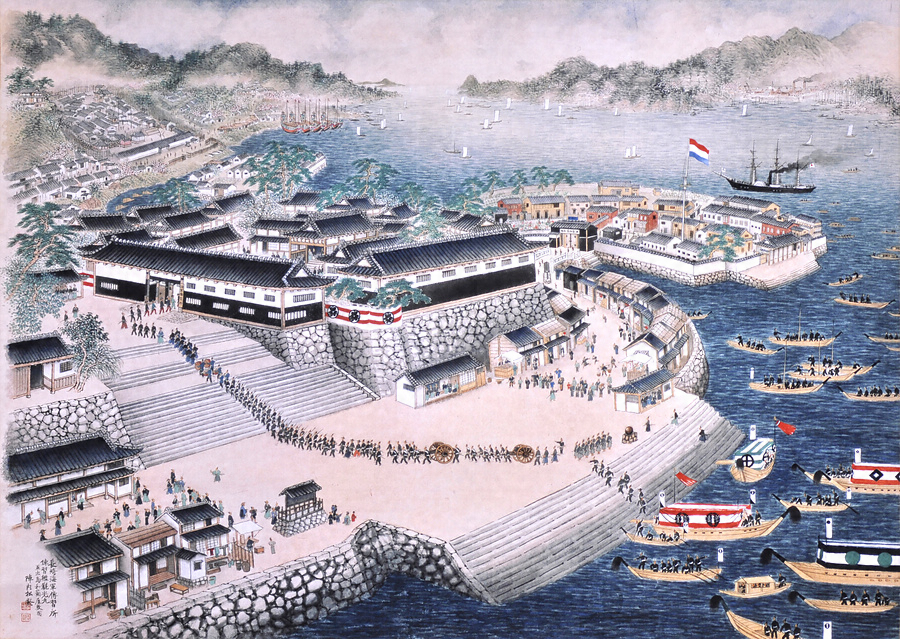
The Nagasaki Training Center, in Nagasaki, near Dejima

The Nagasaki Naval Training Center (長崎海軍伝習所, Nagasaki Kaigun Denshū-jo) was a naval training institute, between 1855 when it was established by the government of the Tokugawa shogunate, until 1859, when it was transferred to Tsukiji in Edo.

During the Bakumatsu period, the Japanese government faced increasing incursions by ships from the Western world, intent on ending the country's two centuries of isolationist foreign policy. These efforts cumulated in the landing of United States commodore Matthew Perry in 1854, resulting in the Treaty of Kanagawa and the opening of Japan to foreign trade. The Tokugawa government decided to order modern steam warships and to build a naval training center as part of its modernization efforts to meet the perceived military threat posed by the more advanced Western navies.

== History ==
The training center was established near the Dutch settlement on the artificial island Dejima in Nagasaki, where maximum interaction with Dutch naval technology would be possible. Nagai Naoyuki was appointed the first director with a first class of 37 cadets from the various hatamoto with fealty directly to the Shōgun, and 128 cadets sent from the various feudal han (16 from Satsuma Domain, 28 from Fukuoka Domain, 15 from Chōshū Domain, 47 from Saga Domain, 5 from Kumamoto Domain, 12 from Tsu Domain, 4 from Fukuyama Domain and one from Kakegawa Domain). Katsu Kaishū was director of training under Nagai starting from 1855, until 1859, when he was commissioned as an officer in the Shogunal navy the following year.

Officers of the Royal Netherlands Navy were in charge of education, the first being Pels Rijcken (from 1855 to 1857), and the second Willem Huyssen van Kattendijke (from 1857 to 1859). Western medical science was taught by J. L. C. Pompe van Meerdervoort. The curriculum was weighed towards navigation and Western science. The training institute was also equipped with Japan's first steamship, Kankō Maru given by the King of the Netherlands in 1855. It was later joined by the Kanrin Maru and the Chōyō.

The Nagasaki Naval Training Center provided not only samurai students but also local domain students with opportunities to pursue systematic Western-style naval training. The students gradually overcame language and other barriers and learned various modern naval skills and marine technology and organization . Under the guidance of Dutch instructors, the Shogunate built a factory for the repair of naval ships as a part of the School's supporting facilities. This was the first modern factory in Japan utilizing imported European machinery.

The number of cadets from various domains proved unwieldy, and the second class of 1856 was reduced to only 12 cadets, all from the hatamoto in Edo. In 1857 another naval training academy was opened at Tsukiji in Edo. The director of the center Nagai moved to the new center, and Kimura Kaishū was promoted to director of the Nagasaki center. The third class of 1857 has 26 cadets. The future Admiral Enomoto Takeaki was one of the students of the Nagasaki Training Center. The Training Center was closed in 1859, and all education transferred to the Tsukiji Naval Training Center, where the Kankō Maru was also sailed by a Japanese-only crew.

The decision to terminate the School was made for political reasons, arising from the Japanese side as well as from the Dutch side. While the Netherlands feared that the other Western powers would suspect that they were helping the Japanese accumulate naval power to repulse Westerners, the Shogunate became reluctant to give samurai from traditionally anti-Tokugawa domains opportunities to learn modern naval technology.

Although the Nagasaki Naval Training Center was short-lived, it had considerable direct and indirect influence on future Japanese society. The Nagasaki Naval Training Center educated many naval officers and engineers who would later become not only founders of the Imperial Japanese Navy but also promoters of Japan's shipbuilding and other industries.

== See also ==
- Kobe Naval Training Center, a successor institution under Katsu Kaishū
