= Teiko Kiwa =

Japanese-Dutch opera singer

- 喜波貞子
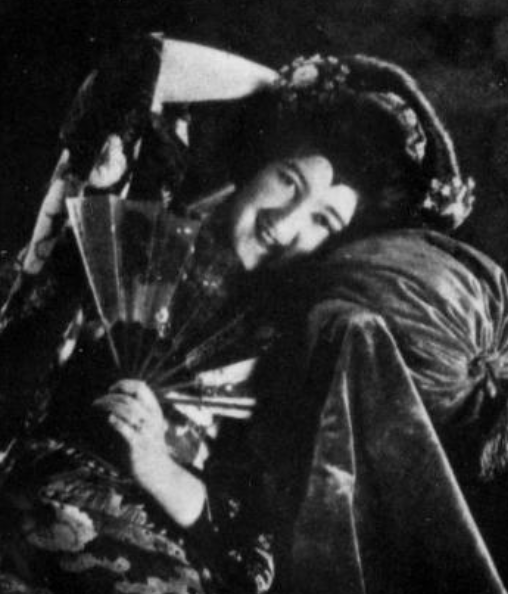
- Teiko Kiwa as "Cio-Cio-San" from a 1926 publication
- Born: Laetitia Jacoba Wjlhelmina Klingen; November 20, 1902; Yokohama, Japan
- Died: May 29, 1983 (aged 80); Nice, France
- Other names: Sadako Kiba, Teiko Rawita-Proszowska
- Occupation: Opera singer

Teiko Kiwa (Japanese: 喜波貞子, romanized: Kiwa Teiko; November 20, 1902 – May 29, 1983), born Laetitia Jacoba Wilhelmina Klingen, was a Japanese-Dutch opera singer. She was known as "the Japanese Duse", a reference to Italian actress Eleanora Duse.

== Early life ==
Klingen was born in Yokohama, the daughter of a Dutch official, Hermanus Klingen, and dressmaker Tsuru Antonia Klingen; her maternal grandmother was Japanese. She moved to Italy in 1920, to train as a singer.

== Career ==
Kiwa (also known as Sadako Kiba) specialized in playing Japanese opera roles, including Cio-Cio San in Puccini's Madama Butterfly, wearing her own authentic kimonos and accessories, rather than the usual European costumes. She starred in Madama Butterfly in her professional debut in 1922, at the Teatro Nacional de São Carlos in Lisbon. She was the first Japanese woman to sing the role at the Polish National Opera, and at the Finnish National Opera and Ballet, and the second to sing the role in Brazil. She also sang the role in many other European cities, including Rome and Vienna. "The exquisite Japanese soprano proved herself beyond dispute the most impassioned actress who has ever interpreted this role," wrote one reviewer in 1926.

She also played Norina in Don Pasquale and Mimi in La bohème. She made recordings for the Victor label in the 1930s. In April 1927, she was described as "the only singer who dares to travel by areoplane." She appeared on the covers of the American magazine Musical Courier in August and September 1927.

== Personal life and legacy ==
Kiwa married Czesław Rawita-Proszowski, a Polish tenor who was also her manager. After World War II, she moved to Nice, and taught singing. Her husband died in 1973, and she died in Nice in 1983, aged 80 years. In 1990, a documentary aired on Japanese television, titled "Mrs. Chocho: Opera Singer Teiko Kiwa's Life", and a CD of her recordings was released. Her remains were returned to Yokohama in 2003. Materials related to her career were part of an exhibit at the Polish National Opera in 2016.
