= Jackass-barque =

Type of sailing ship

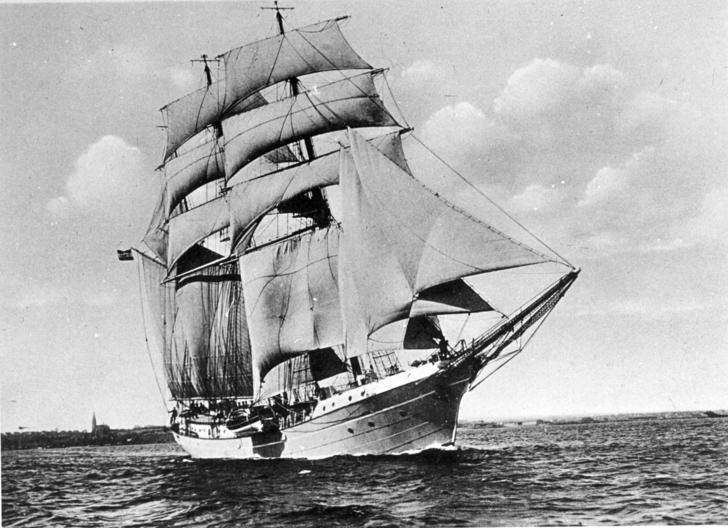
Niobe, training ship of the German navy, here rigged as jackass-barque (1930)

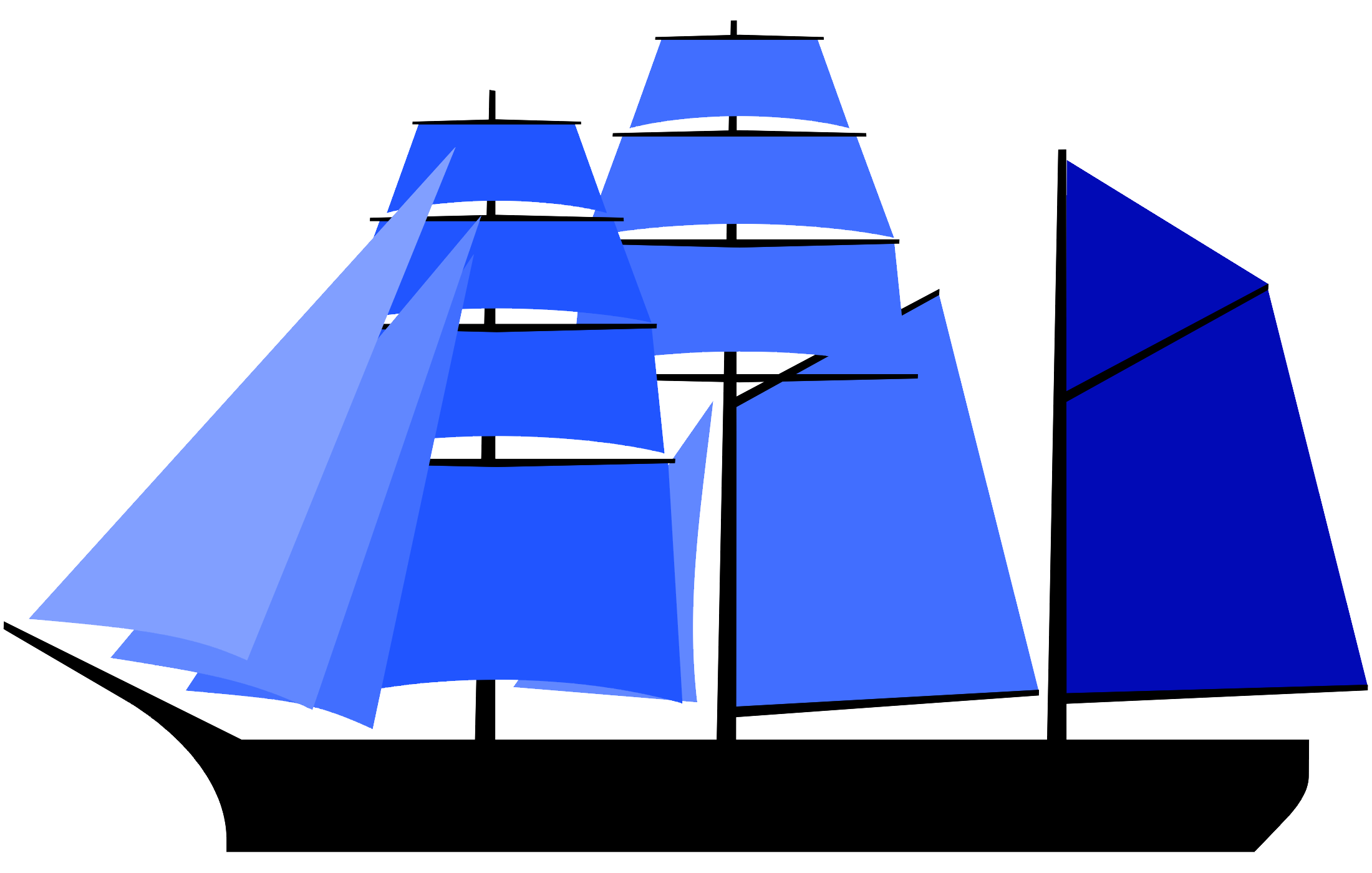
Schematic view of a three-masted jackass barque sailing rig.

A jackass-barque, sometimes spelled jackass bark, is a sailing ship with three (or more) masts, of which the foremast is square-rigged and the main is partially square-rigged (topsail, topgallant, etc.) and partially fore-and-aft rigged (course). The mizzen mast is fore-and-aft rigged.

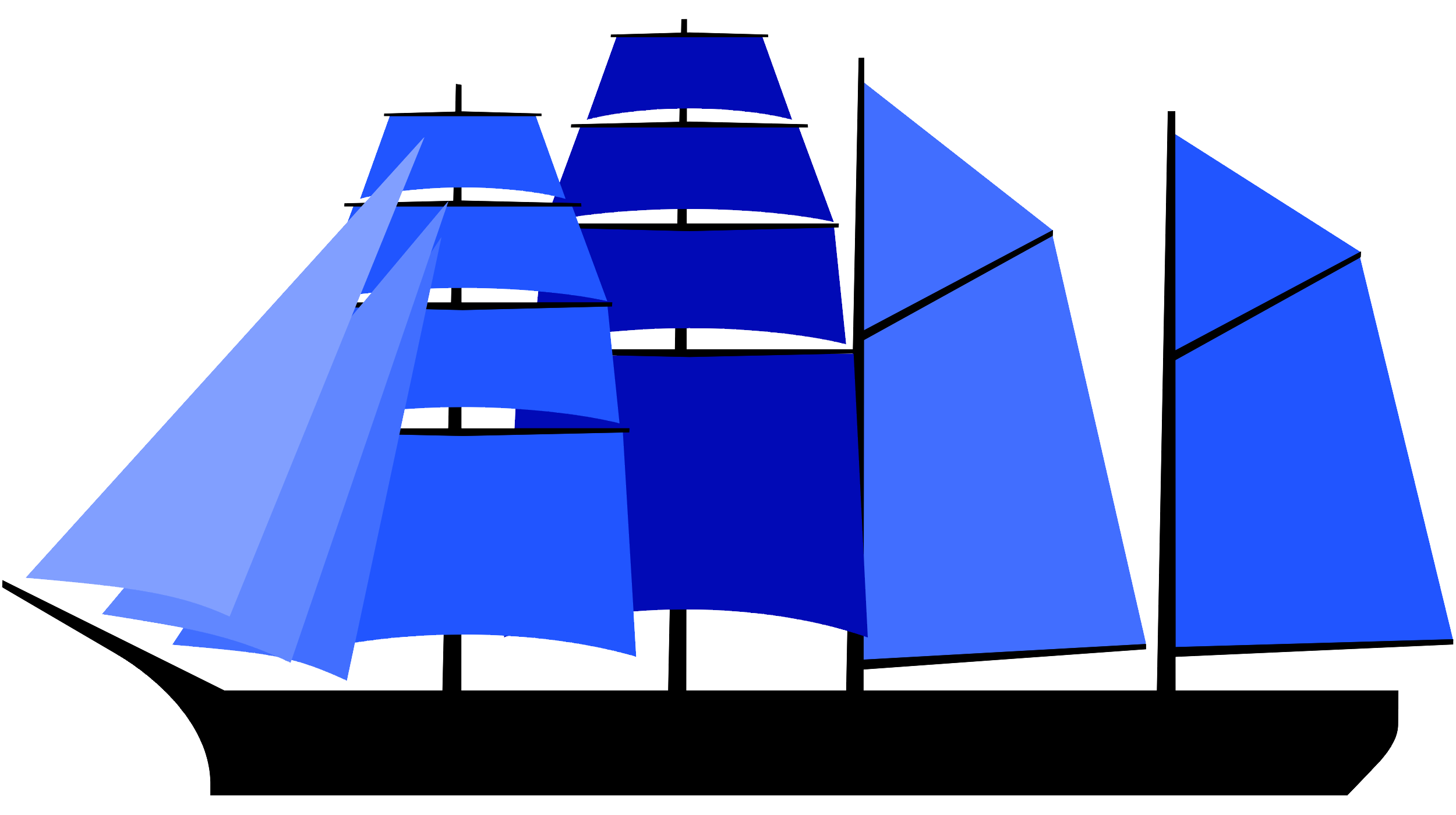
Schematic view of a four-masted jackass barque sailing rig.

A four-masted jackass barque is square-rigged on the two foremost masts (fore and main masts) and fore-and-aft rigged on the two after masts (the mizzen and spanker or jiggermasts). Some 19th-century sailors called such a ship "a fore-and-aft schooner chasing a brig". In general a jackass barque is a sailing ship which is half square-rigged and half fore-and-aft rigged. The name appears to be an erroneous reference to a mule, which is half horse and half donkey.

A five-masted jackass barque, which has probably never been built, would be equipped with square-rigged fore and main masts, with a partially square-rigged and partially fore-and-aft rigged mizzen mast, and fore-and-aft rigged jigger and spanker masts.

== The Olympic ==
A well-known example of a (white wood-hulled) four-masted jackass-barque was the Olympic, a 1,402 GRT "Down Easter" (a square-rigged sailing ship from the dockyards of the downeastern ports, preferably made of timber). Said to be the only one in the world, she was launched in 1892 at the shipyard of the New England Ship Building Company, Bath, ME, for Captain W. H. Besse of New Bedford, Massachusetts.^{1} Her maiden voyage under her first master, Captain Stephen Bourne Gibbs, led her from Bath to New York City, South Street Seaport, with "clean swept holds" and without any ballast, then with a cargo of iron rails and plates around Cape Horn to Portland, Oregon. She carried steel, nitrate, and other cargoes. Captain Gibbs was an experienced square-rigged skipper, and took great care of best stowage of the cargo, having the stevedores put 2/3 of it in the 'tween decks. For her new owner, Hackfield & Co. of Honolulu, managed by Williams, Dimond & Co., the Olympic ran in the sugar trade between Hawaii, California, and Australia from 1901 to 1912. Originally rigged with royal sails over double top and topgallant sails on both square-rigged masts and the main mast equipped with an additional single sky sail, she was re-fitted with royal sails over double top but single topgallant sails on both square-rigged masts and no main sky sail after being dismasted in 1901 during a voyage from Hawaii to San Francisco under Captain Gibbs, who retired from the sea in the same year. Under her new master Captain T. H. Evans she sailed between New Zealand, Australia and the US west coast in the timber trade. Towards the end of World War I she changed hands to Thomas Crowley & Co. In that time she was re-rigged as a four-masted barquentine with a square-rigged foremast and three fore-and-aft rigged other masts. During the slump years cargo space of a sailing ship wasn't needed anymore. After being laid up for some years the 30-year-old ship was converted into a towing barge.

== The California ==
A well-known example of a steel four-masted jackass-barque was the California (1890), the last and largest of the White Star sailing ships. The use of steel enabled the addition of another hundred feet to the two hundred foot effective maximum length of a wooden vessel. A fourth mast, called the jigger, provided the driving power for the increased length. The lower and topmast were built in one steel tubular piece. Mechanical improvements were introduced to the rigging.

== On the Great Lakes ==
The City of Grand Haven had two masts "set far apart to accommodate high piles of lumber on the deck and to make it easier to load and unload the vessel. This rig was called the Grand Haven Rig or (Jack Ass Rig)..." It was said to have been the result of a serendipity, when the master of a three-masted schooner had its mainmast removed due to rot, and found how well the ship sailed. There "were at least a dozen craft with this rig many of them in Lake Michigan." Similar rigs might be called a "jackass schooner."

== Bibliography ==
- Lubbock, Capt. Alfred Basil (June 1987) [1929]. The Down Easters, American deep-water sailing ships, 1868-1919' (Paperback). Boston: Charles E. Lauriat Co, Dover Pubns. p. 284. ISBN 0486253384. ISBN 978-0486253381.

== See also ==
- Barque
- Barquentine
- Schooner
- SS Great Eastern, a ship with paddle wheels and a screw propeller, also rigged with six masts, three (1,5,6) fore-and-aft rigged and three (2,3,4) square-rigged
- Brig
