= Japanese School of Amsterdam =

The Japanese School of Amsterdam
- アムステルダム日本人学校; De Japanse School van Amsterdam

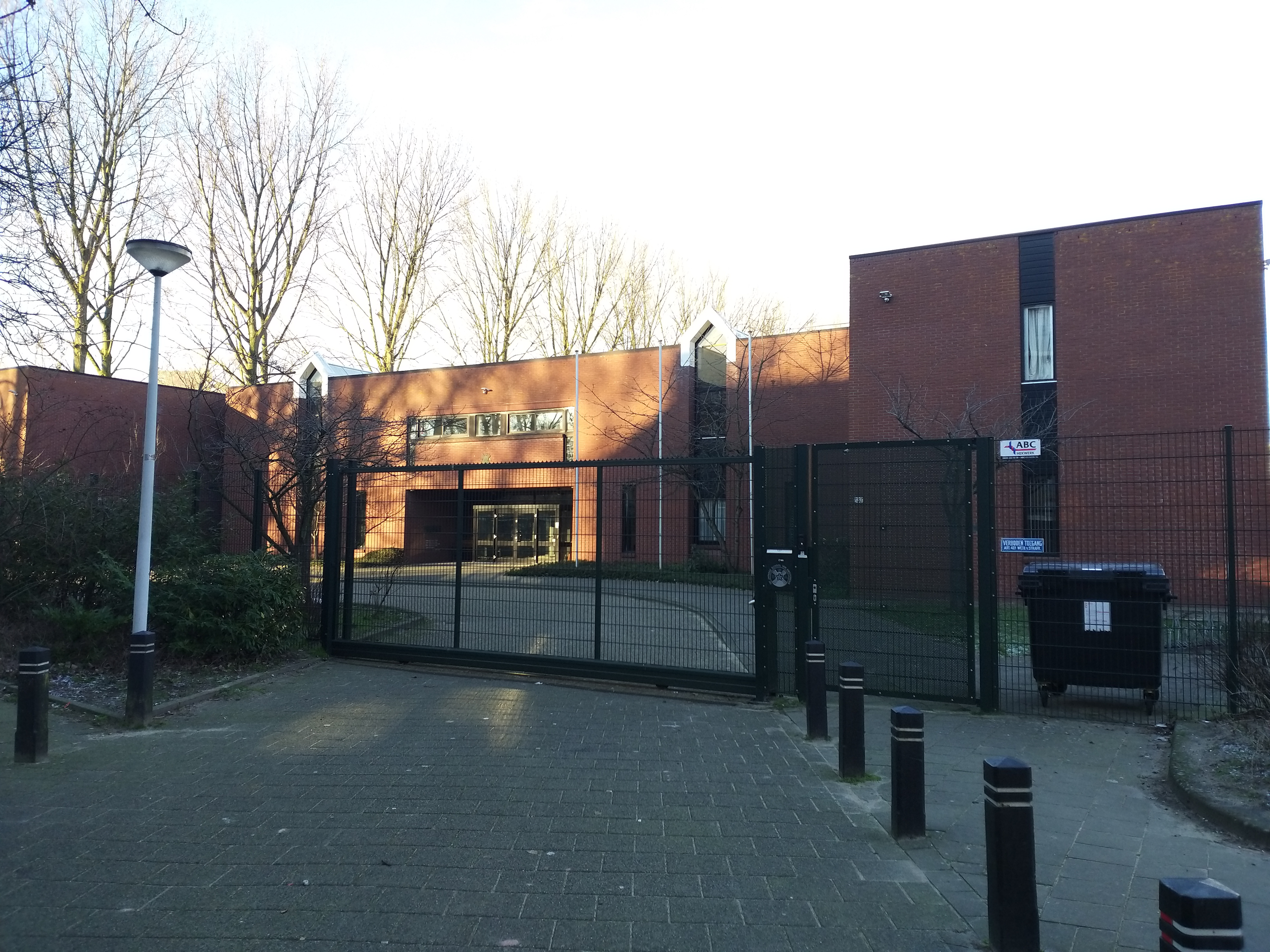

Location
- Karel Klinkenbergstraat 137, 1061AL Amsterdam; Amsterdam; Netherlands; 52.3680°N 4.8353°E

Information
- Type: Japanese international school
- Established: 1979; 47 years ago
- Website: jsa.nl

The Japanese School of Amsterdam (JSA, Dutch: De Japanse School van Amsterdam, Japanese: アムステルダム日本人学校 Amusuterudamu Nihonjin Gakkō) is a Japanese international school in Amsterdam. As of 1997, the JSA is the Japanese school for about 66% of the Japanese nationals in the country. The Japanese government subsidizes the school.

== History ==
It was founded in 1979 with 42 students in elementary and junior high school levels.

Its original location was on Frans Halsstraat.

The school was established to provide a Japanese-style education to children of Japanese national employees living in the city. It had 320 students in 1989.

As of April 2022, there were about 170 students enrolled at the JSA.

== Culture ==
As of 1989, the students at the school had some baseball tournaments in which local Dutch schools and international schools using the United States system were opponents, but otherwise, according to Rozemarie de Ruiter of Leeuwarder Courant, the students did not mingle with local children often.

== Curriculum ==
Students in grades 1-5 are required to take Dutch classes. In 1989, each student, every week, had two hours of Dutch as a second language classes. The school also has English classes.

== Demographics ==
Most of the students' parents are diplomats, businesspeople, and teachers. As of 1989, many students return to Japan after the final year of junior high school.

== Operations ==
The school has had a longstanding exchange programme with the Oudvaart School in Sneek. The programme originated from the parents of one student who previously attended the Fenneport School but later transferred to JSA; they continued to have contact with their child's former school and developed contacts between the two institutions.

== See also ==
- Japanese people in the Netherlands
- Japanese School of Rotterdam
