= Japan Prizewinners Programme =

Former award for Dutch graduates in Japan

The Japan Prizewinners Programme (JPP) was a one-year postgraduate course for outstanding Dutch graduates with a university master's degree, who may aspire to become leaders in Dutch society. Each year up to 20 participants were recruited among the best university graduates in various fields of study.

The programme consisted of a 4-month high-intensity course of Japanese language and culture at Leiden University, The Netherlands. Upon successful completion of the exams, the students would travel to Tokyo, Japan where they would follow an advanced course of Japanese language for 2 months at the Japan-Netherlands Institute in Tokyo. After this specialist language training the students continued with the core of the programme: an internship at a Japanese company or institution, related to their field of study.

The first group of students of the Japan Prizewinners Programme started their training in September 1995. The Dutch Ministry of Education, Culture and Science terminated its support for the program in 2008; the last group of JPP graduates obtained their diplomas in September 2008.
