= Japan-Netherlands Institute =

Research center focused on Dutch-Japanese relations

- 日蘭学会
- Successor: Leiden University Office Tokyo
- Formation: 1975
- Dissolved: 2013; 13 years ago
- Purpose: Focus on historical Dutch-Japanese relations and to foster and promote modern academic and cultural exchange
- Coordinates: 35.6655666°N 139.7283067°E

The Japan-Netherlands Institute (日蘭学会) was a research institute founded in 1975 to carry out research on historical Dutch-Japanese relations and to foster and promote modern academic and cultural exchange. In 1986, they received the Japan Foundation's special prize for contributions to cultural exchange and mutual understanding between Japan and other countries.

The Japan-Netherlands Institute was dissolved in 2013, and many of its activities have since been continued by the Leiden University Office Tokyo.

== Work ==
Intercultural-academic exchange

In 1986, the Japan-Netherlands Institute began a program to enable Dutch students and researchers to carry out an integral part of their research in Japan. Starting in 1994 the Dutch Ministry of Education, Culture and Science began supporting the institute eventually leading to its Japan Prizewinners Program (JPP) from 1995–2008 wherein Dutch students were selected to study modern Japan for a year before being sent to Japan to study and carry out their research plans. 210 students ultimately passed through the JPP before its conclusion in 2008. Study abroad programs are still supported by the institute however.

In addition to their exchange programs, the Japan-Netherlands Institute held symposiums on a wide range of topics, organized lectures at their site or at Japanese universities by prominent Dutch scientists, published notices of the findings of young Japanese and Dutch scholars, and offered aide and assistance to Japanese and Dutch scholars within either country.

Research

Research on Dutch-Japanese studies was both supported and carried out by the institute, and formed the basis for a majority of their publications.
