= Katsu Kaishū =

Japanese noble, statesman and naval engineer (1823–1899)

Count Katsu Yasuyoshi
- 勝 安芳
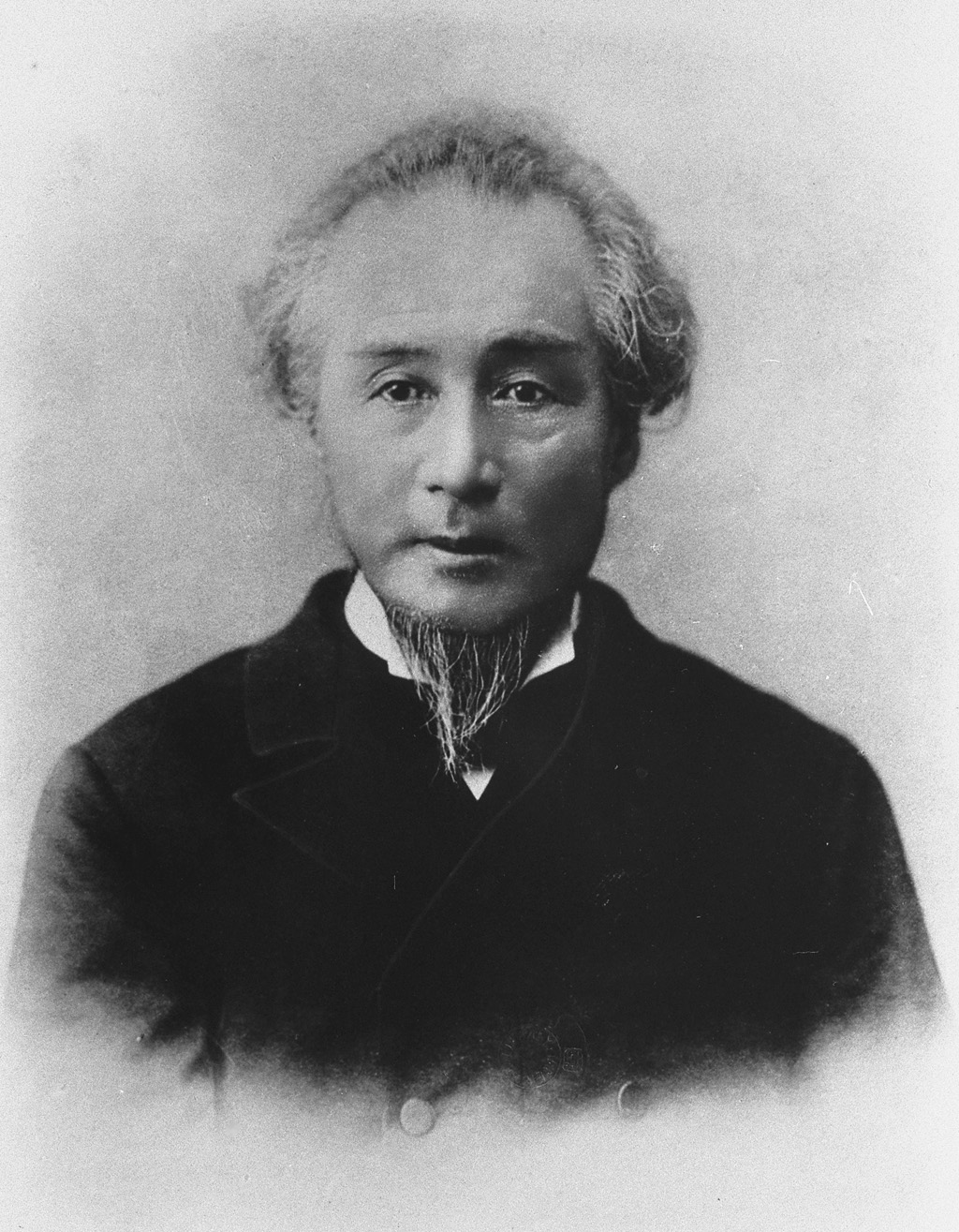
- Born: Katsu Yoshikuni; March 12, 1823; Honjo, Edo, Japan
- Died: January 21, 1899 (aged 75); Akasaka, Tokyo, Japan
- Burial place: Senzoku Pond Public Park, Tokyo, Japan
- Other name: Katsu Rintarō
- Spouse(s): Katsu Tamiko, Masuda Ito, 4 other concubines
- Children: 9 children
- Relatives: Katsu Kokichi (father); Katsu Nobuko (mother)
- Military career
- Allegiance: Tokugawa Shogunate; Empire of Japan
- Branch: Imperial Japanese Navy
- Service years: 1855–1868 (Tokugawa), 1872–1899 (Japanese Empire)
- Rank: Gunkan-bugyō (commissioner), Vice Minister, Naval Lord (海軍卿)
- Nicknames: Katsu Kaishū (勝 海舟); Awa Katsū
- Commands: Kanrin-maru (warship), Kobe Naval School
- Conflicts: Boshin War
- Awards: See Honours
- Other work: Military theorist

Count Katsu Yasuyoshi (勝 安芳; March 12, 1823—January 21, 1899), born Katsu Yoshikuni (勝 義邦), best known by his nickname Katsu Kaishū (勝 海舟; Japanese pronunciation: [kaꜜ.tsɯ | kaꜜi.ɕɯː]), was a Japanese statesman, naval engineer and military commander in the 19th century, during the late Tokugawa shogunate and early Meiji period.

Kaishū was a nickname which he took from a piece of calligraphy (Kaishū Shooku 海舟書屋) by Sakuma Shōzan. He went through a series of given names throughout his life; his childhood name was Rintarō (麟太郎). He was often called Awa (安房) from his ceremonial title Awa-no-kami (安房守) during the late Tokugawa shogunate and later changed his name to Yasuyoshi after the Meiji Restoration.

An advocate of modernization and westernization, Katsu was an influential figure during the end of the Tokugawa Shogunate (Bakumatsu) and subsequent Meiji Restoration. He eventually rose to occupy the position of commissioner (Gunkan-bugyō) in the Tokugawa navy and was a chief negotiator of the bakufu. As a major Tokugawa commander during the Boshin War, he is particularly known for his surrender of Edo to Imperial forces commanded by Saigō Takamori.

== Early life ==
Born Katsu Yoshikuni on March 12, 1823, in Edo to a low-ranking retainer of the Tokugawa shogunate. His father, Katsu Kokichi, the subject of the autobiography, Musui's Story, was the ill-behaved head of a minor samurai family. As a youth whose given childhood name was Katsu Rintarō (Kaishu was a pseudonym), he studied Dutch and European military science, and was eventually appointed translator by the government when European powers attempted to open contact with Japan. Katsu developed the reputation as an expert in western military technology.

Under the advice of Dutch naval officers, Katsu served as head naval cadet at the Nagasaki Naval Academy between 1855 and 1859.

== Military service ==
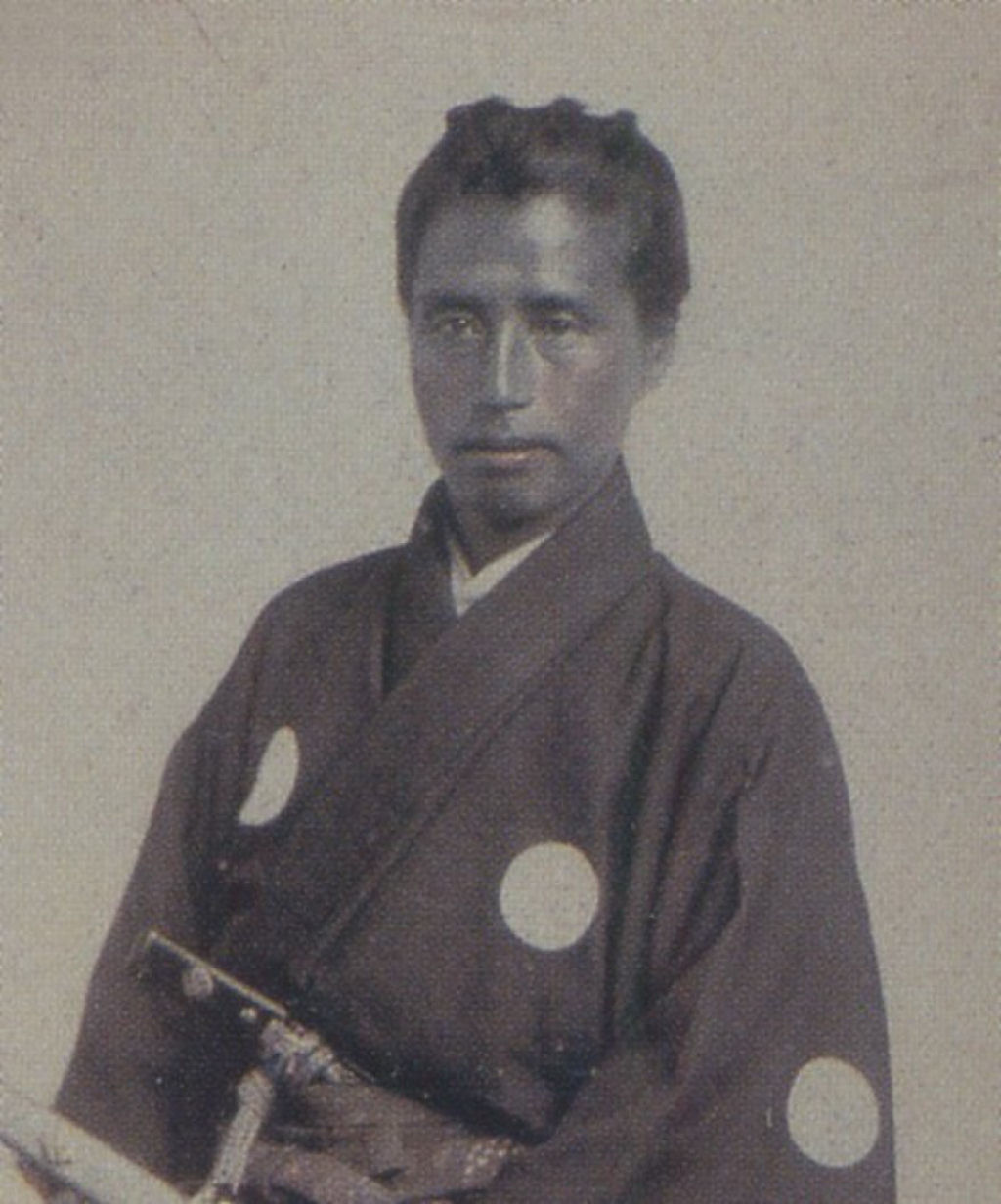
Katsu in San Francisco, 1860

In 1860, Katsu served as captain of the warship Kanrin-maru (with assistance from US naval officer Lt. John M. Brooke), to escort the first Japanese delegation to San Francisco, California, en route to Washington, DC, for the formal ratification of the Harris Treaty. The Kanrin Maru, built by the Dutch, was the first Japanese vessel to sail to the Western world. Kaishū remained in San Francisco for nearly two months, observing American society, culture and technology. There is a well-known quote regarding this matter. Shortly after his return to Japan, he was summoned to the court of Shogun (Tokugawa Iemochi) and was asked by the senior councilors about the "clear differences between the United States and Japan". He replied before the councilors and shogun: "In (the United States of) America, unlike our country, everyone who holds a high position is intelligent enough to deserve that position, sir."

Following his return to Japan, Katsu held a series of high-ranking posts in the Tokugawa navy, arguing before government councils in favor of a unified Japanese naval force led by professionally trained officers in disregard of promotion and assignment due to hereditary status. During his command as director of the Kobe Naval School, the institute would become a major source of activity for progressive thinking and reformists between 1863 and 1864.

In 1862, the then rōnin Sakamoto Ryōma decided to assassinate Katsu due to his support of both modernization and westernization. However, Katsu persuaded Ryōma of the necessity of a long-term plan to increase Japan's military strength in the face of Western influence that led to the Convention of Kanagawa. Instead of killing Katsu, Ryōma started working as his assistant and protégé.

In 1866, Katsu was appointed negotiator between the bakufu forces and the anti-shogunal domain of Chōshū, and later served as chief negotiator for the Tokugawa bakufu, ensuring a relatively peaceful and orderly transition of power in the Meiji Restoration.

Although sympathetic to the anti-Tokugawa cause, Katsu remained loyal to the Tokugawa bakufu during the Boshin War. After the collapse of the Tokugawa forces in late 1867, Katsu negotiated the surrender of Edo castle to Saigō Takamori on 11 April 1868.

== Later years ==
Katsu relocated to Shizuoka after the new Imperial government took control of the shogun's former capital, which was renamed Tokyo ("Eastern Capital"). He returned briefly to government service as Vice Minister of the Imperial Japanese Navy in 1872, followed by first Minister of the Navy from 1873 until 1878. As Katsu Yasuyoshi, he was among the most prominent of the former Tokugawa retainers who found employment within the new Meiji government, and was sangi (参議) between 1869 and 1885. Although his influence within the navy was minimal, as the Navy was largely dominated by a core of Satsuma officers, Katsu served in a senior advisory capacity on national policy. During the next two decades, Katsu served on the Privy Council and wrote extensively on naval issues.

He also made efforts to restore the honor of Tokugawa Yoshinobu and Saigō Takamori.

In 1887, he was elevated to the title of hakushaku (count) in the kazoku peerage system. Katsu recorded his memoirs in the book Hikawa Seiwa.

== Death ==
In 1891, through a connection of Tsuda Sen, the father of Tsuda Ume, Katsu Yasuyoshi purchased a plot of land at Senzoku-ike kôen (洗足池, Senzoku Pond), and built his retirement home there. Following his death in 1899, he was buried with his wife Tami near the site of their home, on the shores of Senzoku Pond, in what is today Senzoku-ike kôen (洗足池公園, Senzoku Pond Public Park) in Tokyo. The Katsu Kaishu Memorial Museum can also be found near the park.

== Honors ==
- Count (9 May 1887)

=== Order of precedence ===
- Fourth rank (15 June 1872)
- Senior fourth rank (18 February 1874)
- Third rank (December 1887)
- Senior third rank (October 1888)
- Junior Second rank (30 June 1894)
- Senior second rank (20 January 1899; posthumous)
- Grand Cordon of the Order of the Sacred Treasure (December 1889)
- Grand Cordon of the Order of the Rising Sun (26 February 1898)

== In popular culture ==
Katsu appears in the 2009–2011 TV series Jin, portrayed by actor Fumiyo Kohinata, and is also portrayed by actor Hiroshi Tamaki in the Time Travel comedy film Time Trip App as a young Kaishu fascinated by Western and modern technology but reluctant to take any political action.

Katsu appears in the Anime Rurouni Kenshin, where the Protagonist Himura Kenshin who once targeted him as an Imperial assassin, now reencounters him in the Meiji era and defends him from a group of vengeful Tokugawa retainers who blame him for their demise, and for having denied them a Samurai death in battle by surrendering the castle.

Katsu appears in the 2024 video game Rise of the Ronin , portrayed in English by actor Earl Baylon and in Japanese by actor Kazuhiro Yamaji.

The Filipino novel Revolution: 80 Days (2022) featured Katsu as one of Japan's top officials.

== Gallery ==
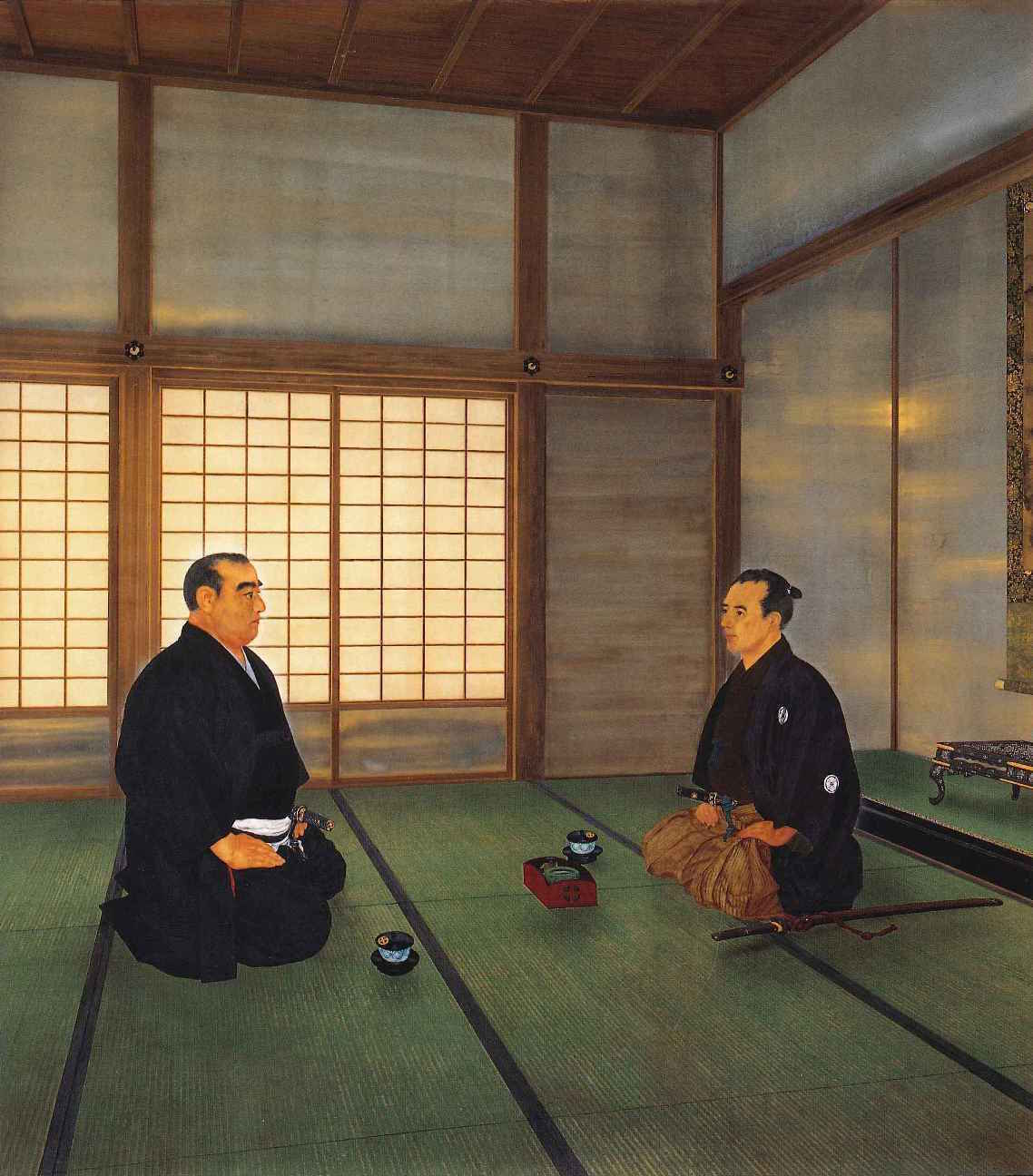
Negotiations between Saigō Takamori (left) and Katsu regarding the surrender of the capital.

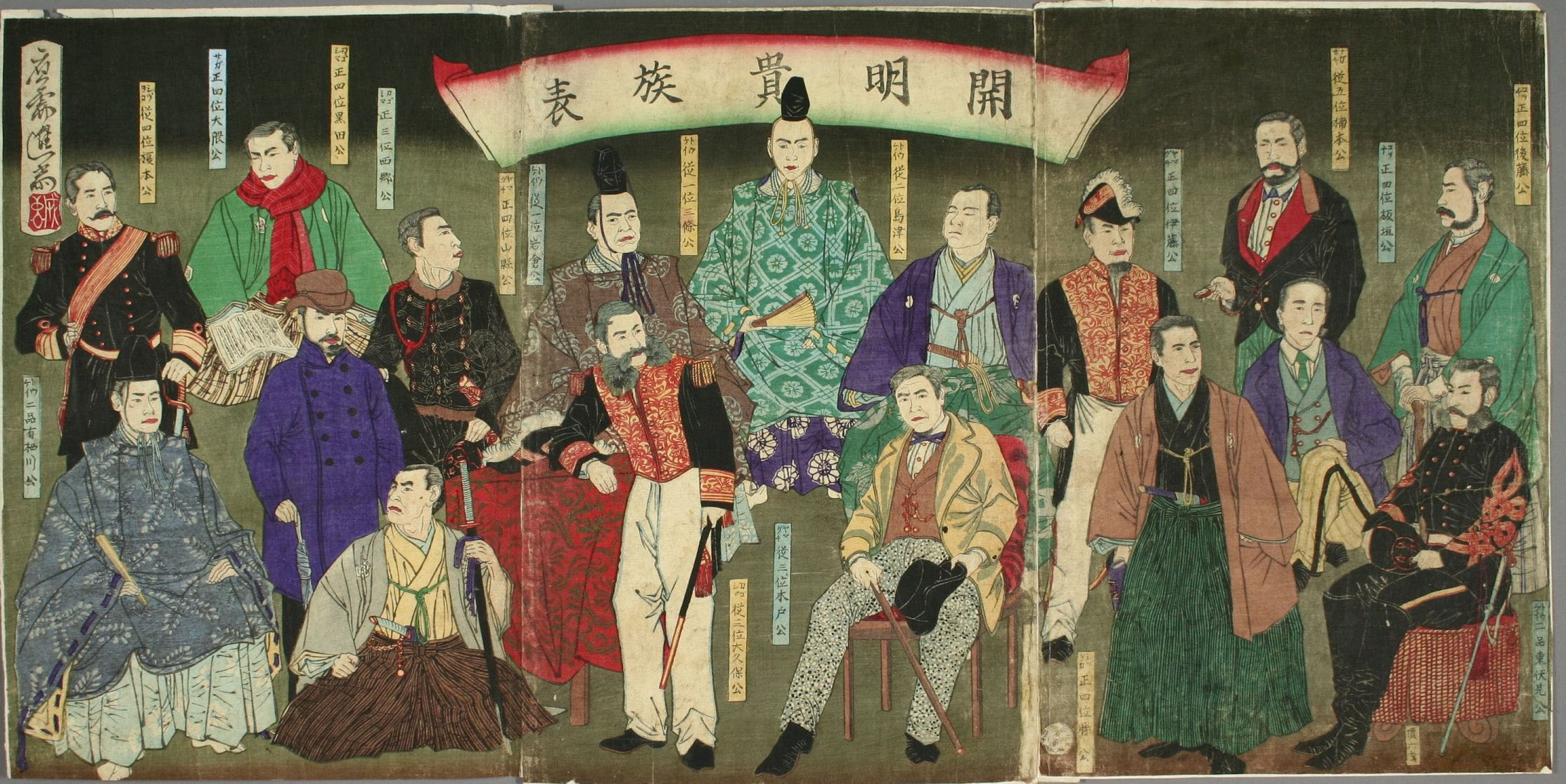
Katsu (bottom row, third from right) and other major figures of the Meiji era aristocracy.

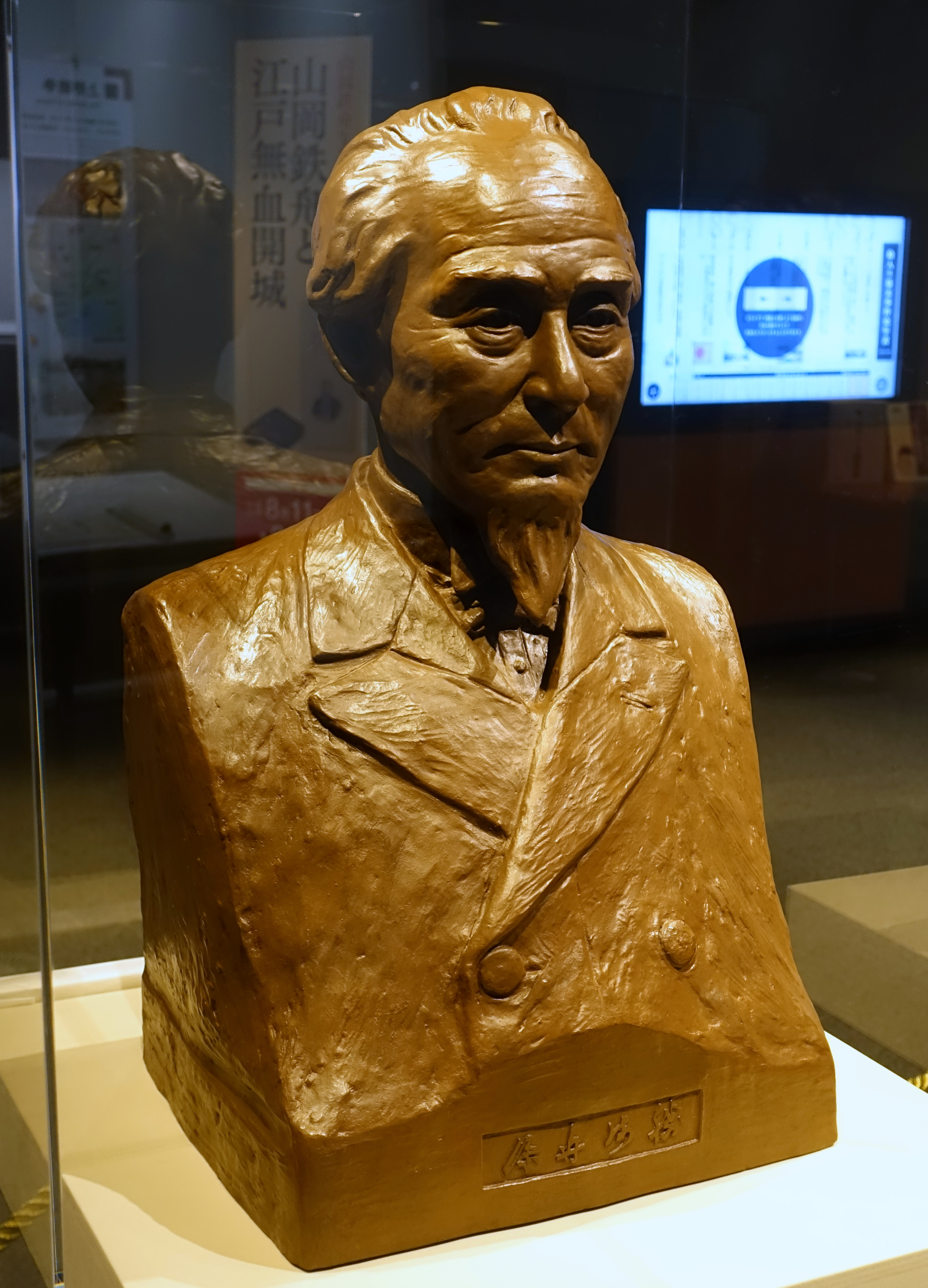
A bust of Katsu Kaishu by Motoyama Hakuun (1871–1952)

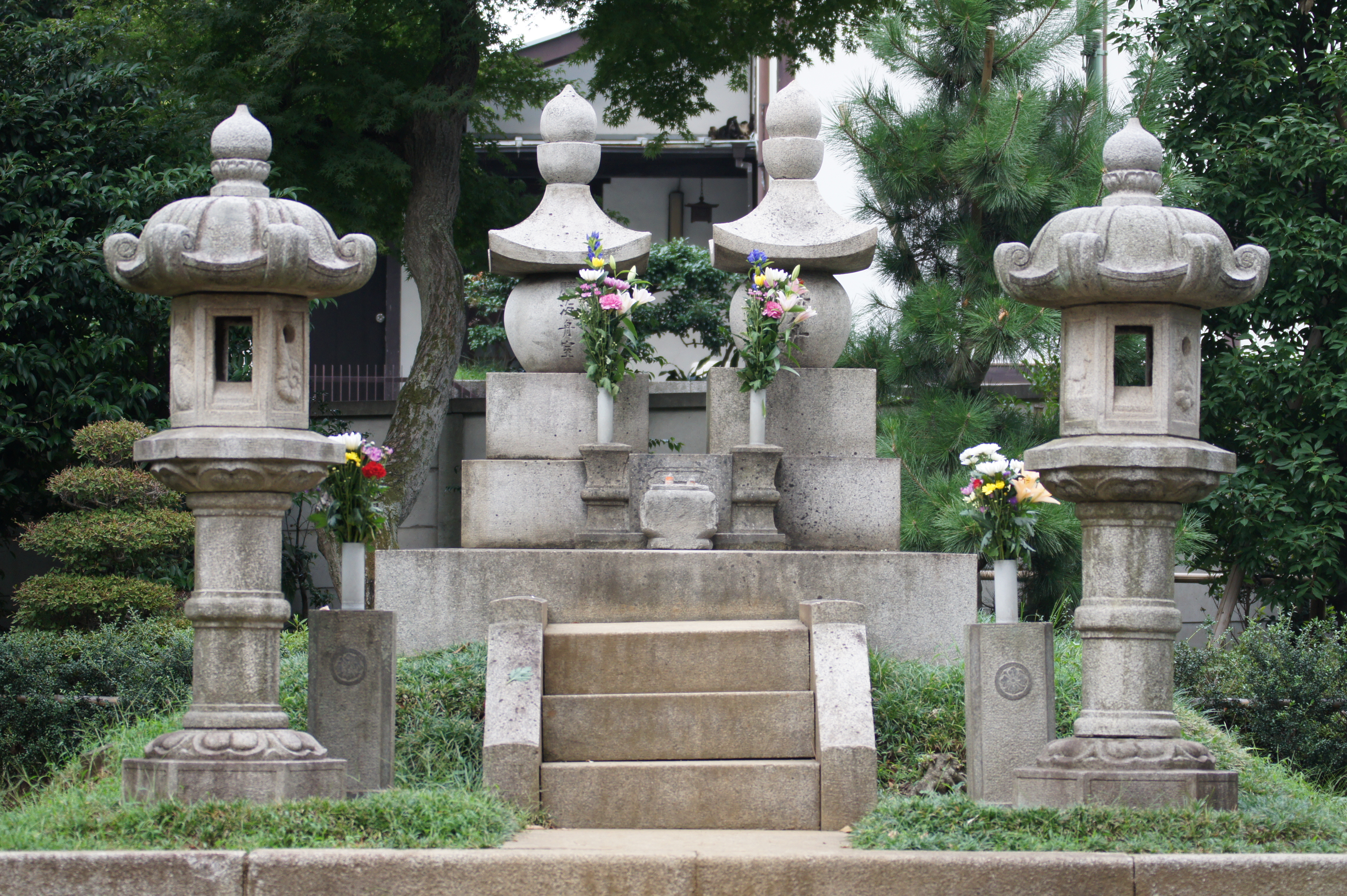
Grave of Katsu Kaishū at Senzoku Pond Public Park, Tokyo, Japan

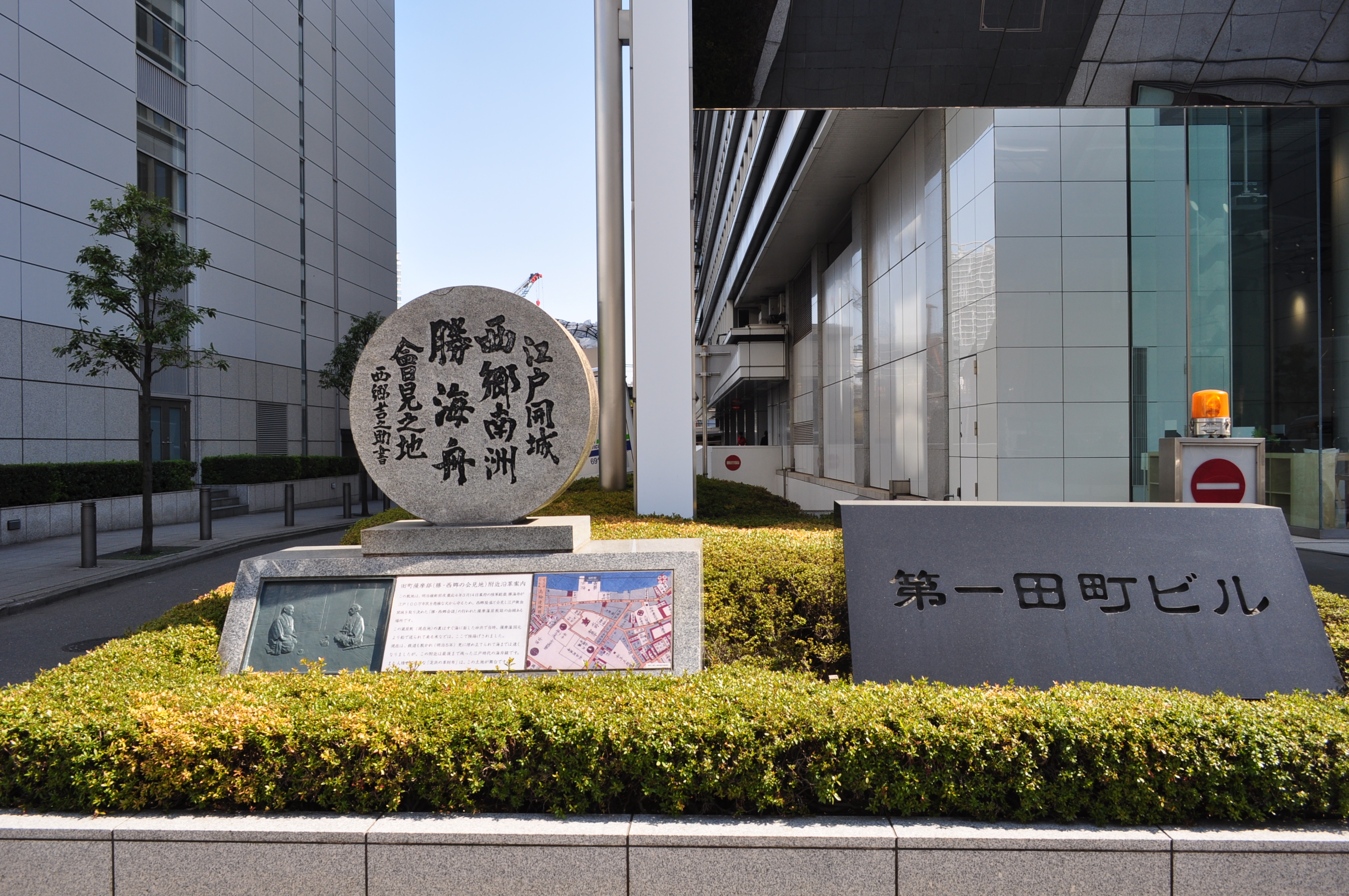
Memorial on the site of the meeting between Saigō Takamori and Katsu Kaishū, Shiba, Tokyo
