= Deaths in June 2000 =

The following is a list of notable deaths in June 2000.

Entries for each day are listed alphabetically by surname. A typical entry lists information in the following sequence:

- Name, age, country of citizenship at birth, subsequent country of citizenship (if applicable), reason for notability, cause of death (if known), and reference.

== June 2000 ==
=== 1 ===
- Angela Annabell, 71, New Zealand musicologist.
- Maud Berglund, 66, Swedish Olympic swimmer (1952).
- H. S. Bhabra, 44, British Asian writer and broadcaster, suicide by jumping.
- Karl-Walter Böhm, 61, German opera singer.
- Oskar Czerwenka, 75, Austrian operatic bass and academic teacher.
- Sir Raymond Ferrall, 94, Australian businessman and author.
- Edgar Z. Friedenberg, 79, American scholar of gender studies.
- Ralph Jones, 79, American drummer.
- Jim Shorter, 61, American gridiron football player (Cleveland Browns, Washington Redskins, Pittsburgh Steelers).
- Everett Swank, 87, American basketball player.

=== 2 ===
- Ali Akbar Aboutorabi Fard, 60-61, Iranian revolutionary, car crash.
- Ellis Clary, 83, American baseball player (Washington Senators, St. Louis Browns).
- Svyatoslav Fyodorov, 72, Russian ophthalmologist (a pioneer of refractive surgery) and politician, helicopter crash.
- Adolph Hofner, 83, American swing bandleader and singer.
- Werner Panitzki, 89, German Air Force general.
- Mikhail Schweitzer, 80, Soviet film director, traffic collision.
- Lepo Sumera, 50, Estonian composer.
- Gerald James Whitrow, 87, British mathematician, cosmologist and science historian.

=== 3 ===
- Leonard Baskin, 77, American sculptor, visual artist and writer.
- Ted Graber, 79-80, American interior designer, Alzheimer's disease.
- Jaishankar, 61, Indian actor, heart attack.
- Nevena Kokanova, 61, Bulgarian film actress, cancer.
- Max van Loon, 73, Dutch Olympic equestrian (1952).
- Merton Miller, 77, American Nobel Prize-winning economist.
- William E. Simon, 72, American politician and businessman, U.S. Secretary of the Treasury (1974-1977), respiratory disease.
- Ann Tse-kai, 87, Hong Kong industrialist and legislator.
- Fernand Viau, 91, Canadian politician, member of the House of Commons of Canada (1945-1957).

=== 4 ===
- Clarence Carter, 96, American artist.
- Emily Crofford, 73, American author.
- Sir James Glover, 71, British army general.
- Takashi Kano, 79, Japanese football player, heart failure.
- Richard A. Peterson, 77, United States Army Air Forces flying ace and architect, cancer.
- Mark Samaranayake, 86, Sri Lankan actor.
- Hiroji Satoh, 75, Japanese table tennis player.
- Augusta H. Teller, 91, American scientist and computer programmer, lung disease.
- Paul Zoungrana, 82, Burkinabé cardinal of the Roman Catholic Church.

=== 5 ===
- Isaak Bubis, 90, Moldavian Soviet engineer and architect.
- Carl-Erik Creutz, 88, Finnish radio announcer.
- Houshang Golshiri, 62, Iranian writer and critic, meningitis.
- Jeanne Hersch, 89, Swiss philosopher.
- Don Liddle, 75, American baseball player (Milwaukee Braves, New York Giants, St. Louis Cardinals).
- João Nogueira, 58, Brazilian samba singer and composer.
- Anna Birgitta Rooth, 81, Swedish academic.
- Franco Rossi, 81, Italian film screenwriter and director.
- Eugene M. Zuckert, 88, American Secretary of the Air Force, pneumonia

=== 6 ===
- Blair Clark, 82, American journalist and political activist.
- James S. Clark, 78, American politician.
- Frédéric Dard, 78, French writer.
- Arnie Johnson, 80, American professional basketball player (Rochester Royals).
- Seiroku Kajiyama, 74, Japanese politician.
- Alexander Evert Kawilarang, 80, Indonesian freedom fighter and military commander.
- Håkan Lidman, 85, Swedish athlete and Olympian (1936, 1948).
- Maria Laura Mainetti, 60, Italian Catholic sister, stabbed.
- William McMillan, 71, World-class American sport shooter and Olympic champion (1952, 1960, 1964, 1968, 1972, 1976).
- Sandy Stephens, 59, American football player (Minnesota Golden Gophers).
- Joan Tate, 77, English translator.
- Feltus Taylor, 38, American convicted murderer, execution by lethal injection.

=== 7 ===
- Ido Cattaneo, 94, Italian alpine skier.
- Selwyn Charles, 64, Trinidadian cricketer and parliamentarian.
- Matthew Coppolino, 70, American politician.
- Bennie Demps, 49, American serial killer, execution by lethat injection.
- Clint Houston, 53, American jazz double-bassist.
- Don Klosterman, 70, American gridiron football player and executive (Houston Oilers, Baltimore Colts, Los Angeles Rams).
- James Moore, 44, American gospel musician, colon cancer.
- Ljubiša Savić, 41, Bosnian Serb paramilitary commander and post-war politician, shot.
- Jock Tradd, 77, Australian rugby league footballer.
- Barbara Jo Walker, 74, American model and Miss America in 1947.

=== 8 ===
- Andy Aitken, 80, Scottish footballer and Olympian (1948).
- Hart Amos, 83, Australian comic strip writer and artist.
- Lucy May Cranwell, 92, New Zealand botanist.
- Doug Davies, 63, South African motorcycle rider.
- H. Jay Dinshah, 66, American veganism activist and natural hygiene proponent, heart attack.
- Norman A. Erbe, 80, American politician, Iowa governor from 1961 to 1963, congestive heart failure.
- Georges Fages, 66, French rugby player and coach.
- Jack Gaud, 42, Indian actor, heart attack.
- Donald Kalish, 80, American logician and anti-war activist.
- Jack Kroll, 74, American journalist and film critic, colon cancer.
- Jeff MacNelly, 52, American editorial cartoonist and the creator of the comic strip Shoe, lymphoma.
- Larry Nuber, 51, American auto racing announcer, cerebral hemorrhage.
- Kermit Roosevelt Jr., 84, American intelligence officer.
- Stephen Saunders, 52, British Army officer, drive-by shooting.
- Jaswinder Kaur Sidhu, 24, Indo-Canadian beautician, murder by slashing.
- Teuvo Tulio, 87, Finnish film director and actor.
- Klaus Weiß, 55, German Olympic handball player (1972).

=== 9 ===
- John Abramovic, 81, Croatian-American professional basketball player.
- Sir John Balcombe, 74, British jurist, Lord Justice of Appeal.
- Leif Björk, 92, Swedish economist.
- Shay Brennan, 63, Irish footballer, heart attack.
- Dennis Ciclitira, 81, British soldier and businessman of Greek descent.
- Ernst Jandl, 74, Austrian writer.
- Jacob Lawrence, 82, American painter and educator, lung cancer.
- Muhammad Noor, 75, Indian football player and Olympian (1952, 1956).
- Amédée Rolland, 86, French racing cyclist.
- George Segal, 75, American painter and sculptor, cancer.
- Asle Strand, 46, Norwegian luger and Olympian (1976, 1984).
- Alfred Weidenmann, 84, German film director, screenwriter, and children's author.

=== 10 ===
- Hafez al-Assad, 69, President of Syria, heart attack.
- Rômulo Arantes, 42, Brazilian swimmer, actor, and Olympian (1972, 1976, 1980), plane crash.
- Jack Brewer, 70, English bishop, cancer.
- Haim Cohen-Meguri, 87, Israeli politician.
- Roy Dunn, 89, American Olympic wrestler (1936).
- Terry Forrestal, 52, English actor (Titanic) and stuntman (Braveheart, Batman), BASE jumping accident.
- Jack Hoobin, 72, Australian cyclist and Olympian (1948).
- Victor Joly, 77, Belgian cyclist.
- Frank Patterson, 61, Irish tenor.
- Brian Statham, 69, English professional cricketer, leukemia.
- J. Watson Webb, Jr., 84, American film editor.

=== 11 ===
- Aud Alvær, 78, Norwegian politician.
- Geneviève Amyot, 55, Canadian poet and novelist, cancer.
- Michel Besnier, 71, French heir and businessman, heart attack.
- Guy Bowers, 67, New Zealand rugby union player.
- Henry Davis, 57, American gridiron football player (New York Giants, Pittsburgh Steelers).
- Lew Gallo, 71, American actor and television producer (Twelve O'Clock High, The Twilight Zone).
- Karl-Heinz Holze, 69, German football player.
- Elizabeth Lawrence, 77, American actress, cancer.
- Rajesh Pilot, 55, Indian Air Force officer and politician, traffic collision.
- Ruth Rubin, 93, Canadian-American Yiddish folklorist and singer.
- Earl Shinhoster, 49, American civil rights activist, traffic collision.
- Claus Westermann, 90, German theologian.

=== 12 ===
- Irving Anker, 88, American educator, natural causes.
- Leonard Appelbee, 85, English painter.
- Yun Bulong, 62, Chinese politician, Chairman of Inner Mongolia, traffic collision.
- Lemuel McPherson Christian, 87, Dominican music educator and composer.
- Sir Roualeyn Cumming-Bruce, 88, British jurist.
- Edwin R. Chess, 87, American major general and Chief of Chaplains of the US Air Force.
- Ram Dhani Das, 75, Indian politician.
- Purushottam Laxman Deshpande, 80, Indian writer, actor, and humorist, complications from Parkinson's disease.
- Bruno Martino, 74, Italian composer, singer, and pianist.
- Dave Russell, 86, Scottish football player and manager.

=== 13 ===
- Alberto Adriano, 38-39, Mozambican emigrant, beaten to death.
- Gustavo Albella, 74, Argentine football player.
- John Bramall, 76, English sound engineer.
- Mona Bruns, 100, American actress.
- Marion Campbell, 80, Scottish archaeologist.
- Robert Dienst, 72, Austrian football player.
- Yefim Gamburg, 75, Soviet and Russian animation director.
- Ruth Harrison, 79, English animal welfare activist and writer, cancer.
- Herbert Maschke, 69, German footballer.
- Mitchell Olenski, 80, American football player (Miami Seahawks, Detroit Tigers), and coach.
- Christian Pire, 69, French diver and Olympian (1956, 1960).
- Chaudhary Raghvendra Singh, 89, Indian real estate developer.
- Jock Shaw, 87, Scottish football player.
- Duane Thomas, 39, American welterweight boxer, murdered.
- Bobby Tiefenauer, 70, American baseball player.

=== 14 ===
- Attilio Bertolucci, 88, Italian poet and writer.
- Marshall J. Beverley, 88, American banker.
- Kurt Böwe, 71, German actor.
- Chan Caldwell, 80, American football coach.
- Frederic G. Cassidy, 92, Jamaican-American linguist and lexicographer.
- Paul Griffin, 62, American musician, heart attack.
- Robert Trent Jones, 93, British–American golf course designer.
- Uriah Jones, 75, American Olympic fencer (1968).
- Gianmatteo Matteotti, 79, Italian politician.
- Peter McWilliams, 50, American author, AIDS-related non-Hodgkin lymphoma.
- Harry Melville, 92, British chemist and academic.
- Karl Schmaderer, 85, Austrian Olympic cyclist (1936).
- Elsie Widdowson, 93, British chemist, dietitian and nutritionist, stroke.
- Greg Wilton, 44, Australian politician, suicide.

=== 15 ===
- James Montgomery Boice, 61, American theologian, liver cancer.
- Arkady Boytsov, 77, Soviet pilot and flying ace.
- Igor Bunich, 62, Russian historian
- Ciaran Clear, 80, Irish painter.
- John J. Daley, 76, American high school teacher and politician.
- Ingrid Dessau, 77, Swedish textile artist.
- Heinrich Fichtenau, 87, Austrian medievalist.
- Neville Ford, 93, English cricket player.
- Grigori Gorin, 60, Soviet and Russian playwright and writer, heart attack.
- Grant MacEwan, 97, Canadian farmer and politician.
- Thomas Ambrose Masterson, 72, American district judge (United States District Court for the Eastern District of Pennsylvania).
- Jules Roy, 92, Algerian-born French writer.
- Pedro Salas, 76, Argentine Olympic cyclist (1952).
- Mîna Urgan, 84, Turkish academic, author and politician.

=== 16 ===
- Ian MacLachlan Arrol, 76, Canadian politician, member of the House of Commons of Canada (1972-1974).
- Rachel Boymvol, 86, Soviet poet, children's book author, and translator.
- Elvin A. Kabat, 85, American microbiologist.
- Empress Nagako, 97, Japanese consort of Emperor Hirohito, old age.
- Nosrat Rahmani, 72, Iranian poet and writer.
- Mike Silliman, 56, American basketball player (Buffalo Braves), and Olympian (1968), heart attack.
- Jiang Weiqing, 89, Chinese politician.

=== 17 ===
- Joe Albanese, 66, American baseball player (Washington Senators).
- Bill Dodgin, Jr., 68, English football player and manager, Alzheimer's disease.
- Juozas Jagelavičius, 61, Lithuanian rower and Olympian medalist (1964, 1968).
- Jack Lindwall, 81, Australian rugby player.
- Ismail Mahomed, 68, South African lawyer (Chief Justice of South Africa), pancreatic cancer.
- Alex Moir, 80, New Zealand cricket player.
- Frank Sponberg, 88, Australian rugby league footballer.
- André Vacheresse, 72, French basketball player and coach.
- Clive Westlake, 67, British songwriter.

=== 18 ===
- Robert Abeles, 74, American biochemist.
- Ekrem Alican, Turkish politician, Deputy Prime Minister.
- Jane Bowers, 79, American folk singer and songwriter.
- Nancy Marchand, 71, American actress (Lou Grant, The Sopranos, Sabrina), four-time Emmy winner, lung cancer.
- Kaarle Pekkala, 80, Finnish Olympic sports shooter (1960).
- Boris Vasilyev, 63, Russian cyclist and Olympian (1960).

=== 19 ===
- Mary Benson, 80, South African civil rights activist.
- Ron Casey, 72, Australian sporting commentator and radio and television pioneer.
- Joseph Jefferson Fisher, 90, American district judge (United States District Court for the Eastern District of Texas).
- Anton Gorchev, 60, Bulgarian actor.
- Christiane Herzog, 63, wife of Roman Herzog, former President of Germany, cancer.
- Tokuji Iida, 76, Japanese baseball player.
- Jan Nawrocki, 86, Polish Olympic fencer (1948, 1952).
- William Papas, 72, South African-born British political cartoonist and caricaturist, flying accident.
- Harry Riccobene, 90, American mobster (Philadelphia crime family), sepsis.
- Louis Romand, 66, French Olympic biathlete (1968).
- Noboru Takeshita, 76, Japanese politician and the 74th Prime Minister of Japan (1987–1989), stroke.

=== 20 ===
- Dick Butler, 74, Canadian ice hockey player (Chicago Black Hawks).
- Basanta Choudhury, 72, Indian actor.
- Jim de Courcy, 73, Australian cricketer.
- Max Danz, 91, German Olympic middle-distance runner (1932).
- Alan Basil de Lastic, 70, Burmese Roman Catholic archbishop, traffic collision.
- Ron Lamb, 56, American football player (Denver Broncos, Cincinnati Bengals, Atlanta Falcons).
- Chanchal Kumar Majumdar, 61, Indian physicist, heart attack.
- Karl Mickel, 64, German writer.
- Carlota O'Neill, 95, Spanish feminist writer and journalist.
- James O'Rear, 86, American actor, natural causes.

=== 21 ===
- Ion Alecsandrescu, 71, Romanian footballer and executive.
- Claude Bissell, 84, Canadian author and educator.
- Ronny Coutteure, 48, Belgian actor, director, author, TV presenter and restaurateur, suicide by hanging.
- Ezequiel Ataucusi Gamonal, 82, Peruvian politician and self-proclaimed prophet, kidney failure.
- Alan Hovhaness, 89, American composer, stomach ailment.
- C. Stanley Ogilvy, 87, American mathematician, sailor, and author.
- Thomas Harrison Provenzano, 51, American convicted murderer, execution by lethal injection.
- Günther Sabetzki, 85, German ice hockey player and executive.
- Billy Sperrin, 78, English football player and coach.
- Bud Stewart, 84, American baseball player.
- Kamilló Szathmáry, 91, Romanian Olympic fencer (1936).

=== 22 ===
- Kedarnath Agarwal, 89, Indian poet and writer.
- Manoranjan Dhar, 96, Bangladeshi politician and diplomat.
- Michel Droit, 77, French novelist and journalist.
- Svein Finnerud, 54, Norwegian jazz pianist, painter and graphic artist.
- Shaka Sankofa, 36, American death-row inmate, execution by lethal injection.
- Osamu Takizawa, 93, Japanese actor, pneumonia.
- Harry Usher, 61, American attorney, heart attack.

=== 23 ===
- Shawkat Akbar, 63, Bangladeshi film actor.
- Scott Baker, 43, American racing driver, racing crash.
- Geng Biao, 90, Chinese politician.
- Mickey Blake, 87, Canadian ice hockey player (Montreal Maroons, St. Louis Eagles, Toronto Maple Leafs).
- Philippe Chatrier, 72, French tennis player and executive.
- Enrico Cuccia, 92, Italian banker.
- Peter Dubovský, 28, Slovak footballer, fall from cliff.
- Leesa Gray, 16, American murder victim, strangled.
- Ed Hughes, 72, American football player (Los Angeles Rams, New York Giants), and coach.
- Yehuda Kalmen Marlow, 68, German-American rabbi, heart attack.
- Ermanno Nogler, 78, Italian Olympic alpine skier (1952), and coach.
- Keith Reemtsma, 74, American transplant surgeon, liver cancer.
- Jerome Richardson, 79, American jazz musician, heart failure.
- Jim Roper, 83, American NASCAR driver, heart and liver failure caused by cancer.
- Bob Tillman, 63, American baseball player (Boston Red Sox, New York Yankees, Atlanta Braves), heart attack.

=== 24 ===
- Vera Atkins, 92, Romanian-British intelligence officer and SOE operative during World War II.
- Hanna Batatu, 74, Palestinian marxist historian.
- Rodrigo Bueno, 27, Argentine singer, car collision.
- Anatoly Chernousov, 63, Russian writer.
- Vintilă Cossini, 86, Romanian football midfielder.
- John Dawson-Damer, 59, British-born Australian racing driver, car crash.
- Enoch Dogolea, 48, Liberian politician, Vice President of Liberia (1997–2000), illness (disputed).
- Duncan Kyle, 70, British novelist.
- Charles Andrew MacGillivary, 83, American Medal of Honor recipient.
- Sadiq Hussain Qureshi, 72, Pakistani politician.
- Robert Ridder, 80, American media businessman and philanthropist.
- Mike Todorovich, 77, American basketball player and coach.
- David Tomlinson, 83, English actor (Mary Poppins, Bedknobs and Broomsticks, The Love Bug), stroke.

=== 25 ===
- Arnold Black, 77, American violinist and composer.
- Ed Brown, 80, American racing driver.
- Ken Burbridge, 88, Canadian diplomat.
- Barbara Christian, 56, American author and professor of African-American Studies, lung cancer.
- Wilson Simonal, 62, Brazilian singer, liver cirrhosis.
- Pascal Themanlys, 90, French-Israeli poet, zionist, and kabbalist.
- Austin Bernard Vaughan, 72, American prelate of the Catholic Church, complications following heart attack.
- Judith Wright, 85, Australian poet, environmentalist and aboriginal rights activist.

=== 26 ===
- Ken Bell, 85, Canadian war photographer.
- Diane Blair, 61, American political scientist.
- Pier Carpi, 60, Italian essayist, novelist, film director and screenwriter, heart attack.
- Stig Engström, 66, Swedish graphic designer and suspected murderer of Olof Palme, suicide.
- Lucien Laurin, 88, French-Canadian jockey and horse trainer.
- Corneliu Mănescu, 84, Romanian diplomat.
- Arne Thomas Olsen, 90, Norwegian actor, stage producer and theatre director.
- Logan Ramsey, 79, American character actor, heart attack.
- George Richardson, 83, Canadian politician, member of the House of Commons of Canada (1979-1980).
- Avraham Yosef Shapira, 79, Israeli politician and businessman.
- Joseph West, 79, Irish Olympic long-distance runner (1952).

=== 27 ===
- Harold Dexter, 79, British organist.
- Larry Kelley, 85, American football player, suicide by gunshot.
- David Neal, 68, English actor.
- Gerhard Pfeiffer, 77, German chess master.
- Pierre Pflimlin, 93, French politician.
- Harry Prowell, 63, Guyanese long distance runner and Olympian (1968).
- Krishna Riboud, 73, Indian historian and art collector.
- Tobin Rote, 72, American football player, heart attack.

=== 28 ===
- Jane Birdwood, Baroness Birdwood, 87, British politician, cancer.
- Haskell Cohen, 86, American basketball executive.
- John Terence Coppock, 79, British geographer.
- William Glock, 92, British arts administrator and music critic.
- Dick James, 66, American football player (Washington Redskins, New York Giants, Minnesota Vikings), prostate cancer.
- Nils Poppe, 92, Swedish actor, comedian, director, screenwriter and theatre manager, stroke.
- Michael Ripper, 87, English actor.
- Anton Tamarut, 67, Croatian Roman Catholic prelate.
- Józef Tischner, 69, Polish priest and philosopher, laryngeal cancer.
- Arnie Weinmeister, 77, American football player (New York Giants) and member of the Pro Football Hall of Fame, congestive heart failure.

=== 29 ===
- John Abineri, 72, English actor.
- C. Anbarasan, Indian politician.
- John Aspinall, 74, British zoo owner, cancer.
- Alex Berman, 86, American medical historian.
- Tomás Cerrate Hernández, 39, Guatemalan gangster, executed.
- Amílcar Cetino Pérez, 35, Guatemalan gangster, executed.
- Roy Gagnon, 87, American gridiron football player (Detroit Lions).
- Vittorio Gassman, 77, Italian actor, heart attack.
- Leo Martello, 69, American Wiccan priest, gay rights activist, and author, cancer.
- Germaine Montero, 90, French singer and actress.
- Rodney Nuckey, 71, English racing driver.

=== 30 ===
- Harold Aks, 78, American conductor and music educator.
- W. David Kingery, 73, American material scientist, heart attack.
- Robert L. Manahan, 43, American actor (Power Rangers), ventricular aneurysm.
- Franklin D. Miller, 55, American Special Forces staff sergeant during the Vietnam War, cancer.
- Vahé Oshagan, 77, Armenian poet, writer, literary critic, complications from heart surgery.
- Ampelio Sartor, 79, French Olympic rower (1948).
- Mikalay Yaromenka, 74, Soviet and Belarusian actor.
