= Crofford =

Crofford is a surname. Notable people with the surname include:

- Emily Crofford (born 1927), American children's writer
- Joanne Crofford (born 1957), Canadian politician
- Keith Crofford (born 1956), American television executive
- Leslie Crofford, American academic
