= Bubis =

Bubis is a surname. Notable people with the surname include:

- Ignatz Bubis (1927–1999), German Jewish leader
- Isaak Bubis (1910–2000), Moldavian Soviet engineer and architect
