= Manjirō =

- Gender: Male
- Language: Japanese

Origin
- Origin: Japanese
- Meaning: Different meanings depending on the kanji used

Other names
- Alternative spelling: 万次郎, 満次郎

Manjirō (written: 満次郎 or 万次郎) is a Japanese masculine given name, and may refer to:

- Nakahama Manjirō (中濱 万次郎; 1827–1898), one of the first Japanese people to visit the United States
- Inagaki Manjirō (稲垣 満次郎; 1861–1908), Japanese diplomat

== See also ==
- 4841 Manjiro, a minor planet named for Nakahama Manjirō
