= Tateishi Onojirō =

Japanese samurai and interpreter (1843–1917)

- 立石 斧次郎
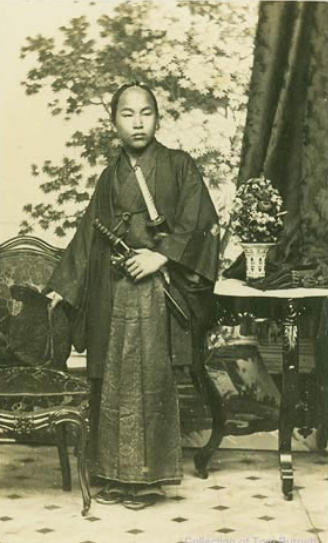
- Portrait of Tateishi Onojirō
- Born: 1843; Edo, Japan
- Died: 1917 (aged 73–74); Japan
- Other names: Nagano Keijirō (長野 桂次郎), "Tommy"
- Occupations: Samurai, interpreter, government official
- Known for: Media sensation during the 1860 Japanese Embassy to the United States

Tateishi Onojirō on the front page of the New York Illustrated News

Tateishi Onojirō (立石 斧次郎, 1843 – 1917), was a Japanese samurai and interpreter who became a major media celebrity in the United States during the 1860 Japanese Embassy to the United States. Affectionately nicknamed "Tommy" by the American public and press, he was celebrated for his affable, flirtatious, and charming personality, making him at the time one of the most famous members of the historic delegation.

== Early life and embassy ==
Born in Edo (modern-day Tokyo) into a samurai family, he was adopted by his uncle, Tateishi Tokujūrō, a Dutch-language interpreter for the Tokugawa shogunate.

In 1860, at the age of 17, Onojirō was chosen to accompany the shogunate's diplomatic mission to the United States as an apprentice interpreter. The primary purpose of the 72-member entourage was to ratify the Treaty of Amity and Commerce.

== "Tommy-Mania" in America ==
While senior Japanese officials maintained a traditional, stoic demeanor, Onojirō's youthful charm and willingness to engage with the public instantly captivated Americans.

Dubbed "Tommy" by the press, he sparked a wave of pop-culture obsession termed "Tommy-mania":

- Public Reception: Crowds of women frequently rushed to see him, standing on chairs at public receptions in Washington, D.C., and New York City. He reportedly received hundreds of love letters and portraits daily.
- Musical Tributes: His celebrity status inspired poems, stories, and sheet music. Composer Charles Grove dedicated a popular dance track to him titled the "Tommy Polka".
- Media Representation: Photography studios, including the famous Matthew Brady, captured portraits of Tommy smiling—a rarity in 19th-century photography—which further endeared him to the public.

Historical analysis notes that Onojirō's reception highlighted complex undercurrents regarding race and masculinity in antebellum America, offering unique perspectives on Asian identity immediately prior to the American Civil War.

== Later career and Meiji period ==
Upon returning to Japan, Onojirō utilized his military samurai training during the Boshin War (1868–1869). Following the Meiji Restoration, he changed his name to Nagano Keijirō.

He continued to serve the Japanese government as a high-level translator and secondary secretary, taking part in the prominent Iwakura Mission to Europe and the United States in 1871. In his later years, he assisted with Japanese immigration management in Hawaii before passing away in 1917 at the age of 73.
