= Kimura Kaishū =

Japanese admiral (1830–1901)

- 木村芥舟
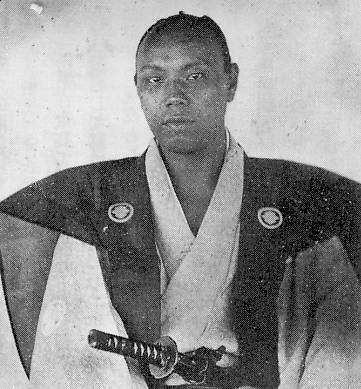
- Born: 27 February 1830
- Died: 9 December 1901 (aged 71)
- Other name: Kimura Yoshitake (木村喜毅)

Kimura Kaishū (木村芥舟; 27 February 1830 – 9 December 1901), also known as Kimura Yoshitake (木村喜毅), was a Japanese admiral known for being the commander of the Japanese Embassy to the United States in 1860, Japan's first foreign embassy mission after the end of sakoku, sailing aboard the Kanrin Maru. He was also the governor of Settsu Province (Japanese: 摂津守, romanized: Settsu-no-kami), which covered parts of modern-day Osaka Prefecture and Hyogo Prefecture.

== Biography ==
=== Early career ===
Kimura was born in 1830 into a Hatamoto family, part of the samurai class in direct service to the Tokugawa shogunate. As a teenager and young man, he held several minor posts within the shogunal bureaucracy. In 1856 he was appointed as director of the Nagasaki Naval Training Center after the previous director, Nagai Naoyuki, moved to the new Tsukiji Naval Training Center in Edo. During this time, Kimura learned about the latest naval technology from Dutch instructors Pels Rijcken and Willem Huyssen van Kattendijke. With the closure of the Nagasaki training center in 1859, Kimura returned to Edo and was promoted to a newly created position, magistrate of warships (Japanese: 軍艦奉行, romanized: Gunkan-bugyō), often translated as "Admiral". At this time, he had a home in the Shinsenza district of Edo (modern-day Hamamatsucho).

=== The Embassy of 1860 ===
After the Harris Treaty of 1858, Japan was required to send ambassadors to the United States to ratify the treaty. These ambassadors travelled on the USS Powhatan, and this vessel was accompanied by the Japanese ship Kanrin Maru, purchased from the Dutch a few years previously, intended as a showcase of Japanese mastery of Western technology. Due to his experience with modern naval technology, Kimura was made commander of the mission, putting him in charge of organising the transport, and, if the ambassadors had been unable to make it to Washington, Kimura would have been deputised to complete the mission in their place.

As commander, Kimura was able to personally select some members of the mission, including Katsu Kaishū, former head instructor at the Nagasaki training centre, who he appointed as captain of the Kanrin Maru; Nakahama "John" Manjiro, one of the few Japanese people to speak good English at the time, as translator and interpreter; and a young Fukuzawa Yukichi as an attendant.

The Kanrin Maru set sail from Uraga on 9 February 1860, and arrived in San Francisco 37 days later, well ahead of the Powhatan, as the other ship had made a stop in the Kingdom of Hawaiʻi. This meant that they were the first Japanese government representatives to set foot in the US, and as such were given a warm and elaborate welcome by the Americans, despite not being the official ambassadors. As the highest-ranking Japanese on the ship, Kimura represented the embassy at the functions, via Nakahama's English–Japanese interpretation. Kimura's insistence on proper etiquette regarding issues such as disembarkation and the order of toasts given at a reception were remarked on by the American press. While he was there, Kimura bought a black Western-style umbrella, different from those made in Japan.

The official embassy arrived in San Francisco aboard the Powhatan on 29 March, and were received with similar acclaim, but left for Washington D.C. on 7 April, while the Kanrin Maru was still undergoing repairs. Kimura had intended to remain in San Francisco until they heard news from Washington about the embassy, but the rudimentary transcontinental communication meant this was not forthcoming, so the Kanrin Maru set off back to Japan from San Francisco on 8 May, and arrived in Uraga on 24 June, having stopped in Hawaiʻi.

=== Later life ===
After returning to Japan, Kimura returned to his duties as magistrate of warships for the bakufu, pushing for modernising reforms to the structure of the Navy. Leading up to and during the Boshin War, Kimura held several different roles on the side of the bakufu. He remained close with Fukuzawa Yukichi in the years after the voyage, the latter spending so much time at Kimura's Shinzenza residence that he was "almost like a member of the household".

Despite having fought for the now-deposed bakufu, after the Meiji restoration Kimura was offered positions in the new government, but he turned them down. During his retirement, he wrote books such as the "Thirty Year History" (Japanese: 三十年史, romanized: Sanjūnen-shi). Kimura died in 1901.

== Bibliography ==
- Cole, Allan B (1941). "Japan's First Embassy to the United States, 1860". The Pacific Northwest Quarterly. 32 (2): 131–66. JSTOR 40486450.
- Doi, Ryōzō (1994). Gunkan Bugyō Kimura Settsunokami : Kindai Kaigun Tanjō No Kage No Tateyakusha. Chūkō Shinsho (in Japanese). Chūōkōron-Shinsha. ISBN 9784121011749.
- Fukuzawa Yukichi (1960). The Autobiography of Fukuzawa Yukichi, with a foreword by Shinzou Koizumi. Translated by Eiichi Kiyooka. Tokyo: The Hokuseido Press.
- Kimura Kaishū (1892). "Sanjūnen-shi. Thirty years' history of the Meiji period". HathiTrust. Japan: Kojunsha.
- "Kimura Yoshitake". Kodansha encyclopedia of Japan. Vol. 4. Tokyo: Kōdansha. 1983.
- Wert, Michael (2013). Meiji Restoration Losers: Memory and Tokugawa Supporters in Modern Japan. Vol. 358 (1st ed.). Harvard University Asia Center. doi:10.2307/j.ctt1x07z05. ISBN 9781684175338.
- Young, Dana B (1983). "The Voyage of the Kanrin Maru to San Francisco, 1860". California History. 61 (4): 264–75. doi:10.2307/25158123. JSTOR 25158123.
