= Kanrin Maru =

First Japanese screw-driven steam corvette

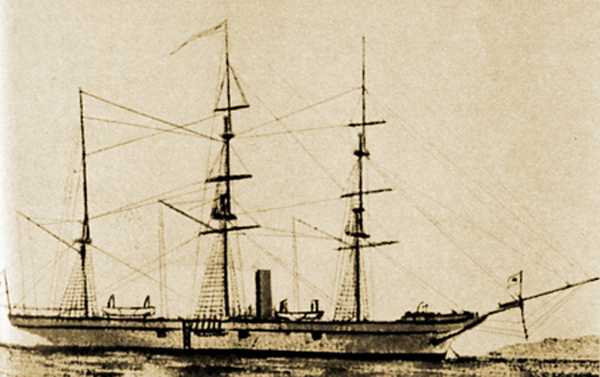
- Kanrin Maru, Japan's first screw-driven steam warship, 1855.

History

Japan
- Name: Kanrin Maru
- Ordered: 1853
- Builder: L. Smit en Zoon, Kinderdijk, Netherlands
- Acquired: 1857
- Decommissioned: 1871
- Fate: Wrecked in a typhoon, 1871

General characteristics
- Class & type: Bali-class sloop
- Displacement: 300 t (295 long tons)
- Length: 50 m (164 ft 1 in) o/a
- Beam: 7.3 m (23 ft 11 in)
- Propulsion: Coal-fired steam engine, 100 hp
- Sail plan: 3-masted sail
- Speed: 6 knots (6.9 mph; 11 km/h)
- Armament: 12 guns

Kanrin Maru (咸臨丸; Unyielding) was Japan's first sail and screw-driven steam corvette (the first steam-driven Japanese warship, Kankō Maru, was a side-wheeler). She was ordered in 1853 from the Netherlands, the only Western country with which Japan had diplomatic relations throughout its period of sakoku (seclusion), by the shōgun's government, the Bakufu. She was delivered on September 21, 1857 (with the name Japan), by Lt. Willem Huyssen van Kattendijke of the Royal Dutch Navy. The ship was used at the newly established Naval School of Nagasaki in order to build up knowledge of Western warship technology.

As a screw-driven steam warship, Kanrin Maru represented a new technological advance in warship design which had been introduced in the West only ten years earlier with HMS Rattler (1843). The ship was built by Fop Smit (later known as L. Smit en Zoon) in Kinderdijk, the Netherlands. The virtually identical screw-steamship with schooner-rig Bali of the Dutch navy was also built here in 1856. She allowed Japan to get its first experience with some of the newest advances in ship design.

== Japanese embassy to the US ==
In 1860, three years after Kanrin Maru was built, the Bakufu sent Kanrin Maru on a mission to the United States commanded by Admiral Kimura Kaishū, clearly wanting to make a point to the world that Japan had now mastered western navigation techniques and ship technologies. On 9 February 1860 (18 January in the Japanese calendar), Kanrin Maru, captained by Katsu Kaishū together with John Manjiro, Fukuzawa Yukichi, and a total of 96 Japanese sailors, and the American officer John M. Brooke, left Uraga for San Francisco.

This became the second official Japanese embassy to cross the Pacific Ocean, around 250 years after the embassy of Hasekura Tsunenaga to Mexico and then Europe in 1614, aboard the Japanese-built galleon San Juan Bautista.

Kanrin Maru was accompanied by a United States Navy ship, the USS Powhatan and arrived in San Francisco on March 17, 1860.

The official objective of the mission was to send the first ever Japanese embassy to the US, and to ratify the new Treaty of Amity and Commerce.

== Reclamation of the Bonin Islands ==
In January 1861, Kanrin Maru was dispatched to the Bonin Islands, also known as Ogasawara Islands in Japanese. A navigator aboard the diplomatic mission, Bankichi Matsuoka was sent to survey the islands. The shogunate of Japan first claimed the Pacific islands and its multi-ethnic settler community in the face of competing Western empires. The islands had previously been claimed by Britain, and the United States had considered making them a navy base. As the flagship, Kanrin Maru was put to use in a display of military power reminiscent of the arrival of Commodore Matthew C. Perry's black ships in Japan just a few years earlier.

== Boshin War ==
By the end of 1867, the Bakufu was attacked by pro-imperial forces, initiating the Boshin War which led to the Meiji Restoration. Towards the end of the conflict, in September 1868, after several defeats by the Bakufu, Kanrin Maru was one of the eight modern ships taken by Enomoto Takeaki in his final attempt to wage a counter-attack against pro-imperial forces.

The fleet encountered a typhoon on its way northward, and Kanrin Maru was forced to take refuge in Shimizu harbour, where she was captured by Imperial forces, who bombarded and boarded the ship notwithstanding a white flag of surrender, and killed her crew.

Following Enomoto's surrender in Hakodate ending the war, Kanrin Maru was transferred from the Ministry of War to the Ministry of Civil Affairs and its Hokkaido Development Commission in 1869. In 1871, she was loaned to a private shipping company contracted to transport settlers from Sendai to Hokkaido under the command of American captains.

== Loss of Kanrin Maru ==
There are conflicting reports regarding her loss following her grounding and subsequent sinking off Cape Saraki in Kikonai, Hokkaido. While it was reported in Tokyo that she was lost in a storm, modern research cannot find evidence of a storm on or about 20 September 1871, and reports have suggested that the captain may have been inebriated, and the government buried the actual cause to avoid a diplomatic incident.

== Legacy ==
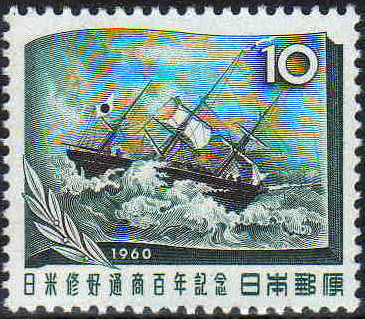
1960 Japanese stamp featuring Kanrin Maru

In 1887 a monument was dedicated at Seiken-ji in Shizuoka to honor the Kanrin Maru crew who were killed in Shimizu harbour during the Boshin War by Shimizu Jirocho.

Three crew members of the Kanrin Maru who had died during the voyage are buried at the Japanese Cemetery in Colma, just south of San Francisco. Originally buried at the Marine Hospital Cemetery in the city, they were moved to Colma in 1926. The graves of Okada Gennosuke (25 years old), Hirata Tomizo (27 years old), and Minekichi (unknown) are commemorated with a stone monument.

In 1960, both the Japanese and U.S. governments issued postage stamps commemorating the 100th anniversary of the 1860 Treaty. The U.S. issued a 4¢ stamp featuring cherry blossoms and the Washington Monument, while Japan issued a ¥10 stamp featuring Kanrin Maru.

The mayor of Osaka, Mitsuji Nakai, presented the city of San Francisco with a monument commemorating the anniversary of Kanrin Maru's arrival and ratification of the Treaty of Amity and Commerce in 1960. It is located in Lincoln Park overlooking the Golden Gate Bridge.

In 1990, a double-scale replica of Kanrin Maru was ordered for manufacture in the Netherlands, according to the original plans. The ship was visible in the theme park of Huis Ten Bosch in Kyūshū, in southern Japan. It is now used as a sightseeing ship to the Naruto whirlpools from Minami Awaji harbour.

Japanese author Doi Ryōzō, a descendant of Kanrin Maru crewmember Nagato Kosaku (an aide to Kimura Kaishū), founded the Society of Kanrin Maru Descendants in 1994 with 10 known fellow descendants. It has since grown to 200 members and actively promotes the study of Kanrin Maru's history.

The Kanrin Maru and Cape Saraki Society was founded in 2004 to commemorate the demise of Kanrin Maru off Cape Saraki, and commissioned a replica of Kanrin Maru on the cape. Additionally, they have planted 50,000 tulips in honor of Kanrin Maru's Dutch roots, and holds a festival in May when the tulips are in full bloom, and in August to in commemoration of the loss of Kanrin Maru.

For the 150th anniversary, a plaque was dedicated on 17 March 2010 by then Japan's Consul General to San Francisco, Yasumasa Nagamine, at Pier 9 on the Embarcadero. As Kanrin Maru's visit was prior to the construction of the Embarcadero seawall extending the waterfront to its current location starting in 1863, Pier 9 is the closest approximation to its mooring location. Additionally, the Japanese sail training ship Kaiwo Maru visited San Francisco in May 2010. Amongst its crew was Masai Yoshiharu, a descendant of Kanrin Maru's engineering officer, Kosugi Masaoshin. Additional members from The Society of the Kanrin-Maru Crew Descendants participated in a reception aboard Kaiwo Maru during her visit. In all, some 40 events were held in the city to commemorate the anniversary.

Artist Ishii Akira created a steel sculpture for the 2013 Setouchi Triennale on Honjima, featuring a model of Kanrin Maru suspended in air in recognition of the many crew members who originated from the area.

== Gallery ==
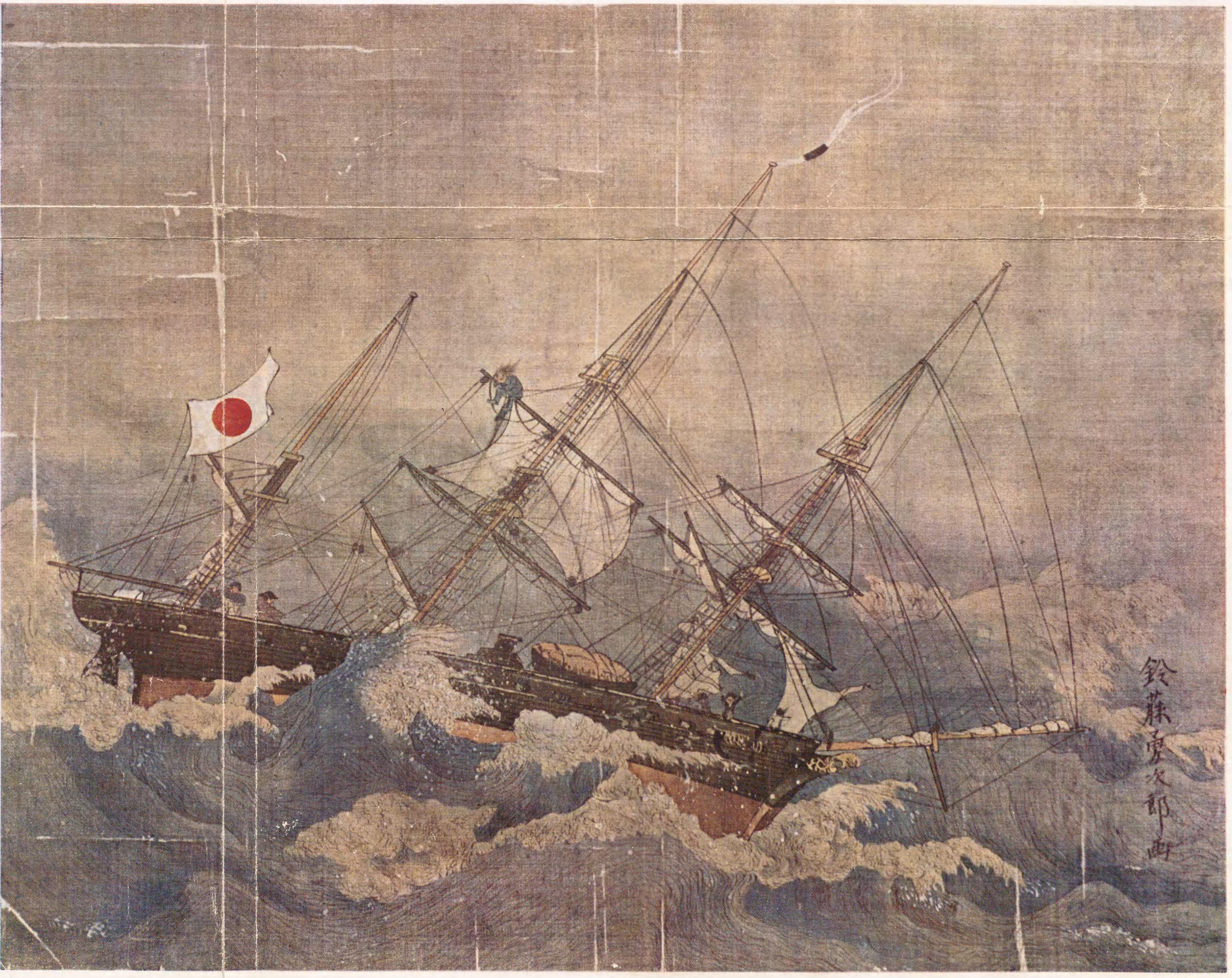
Illustration of Kanrin Maru c.1860

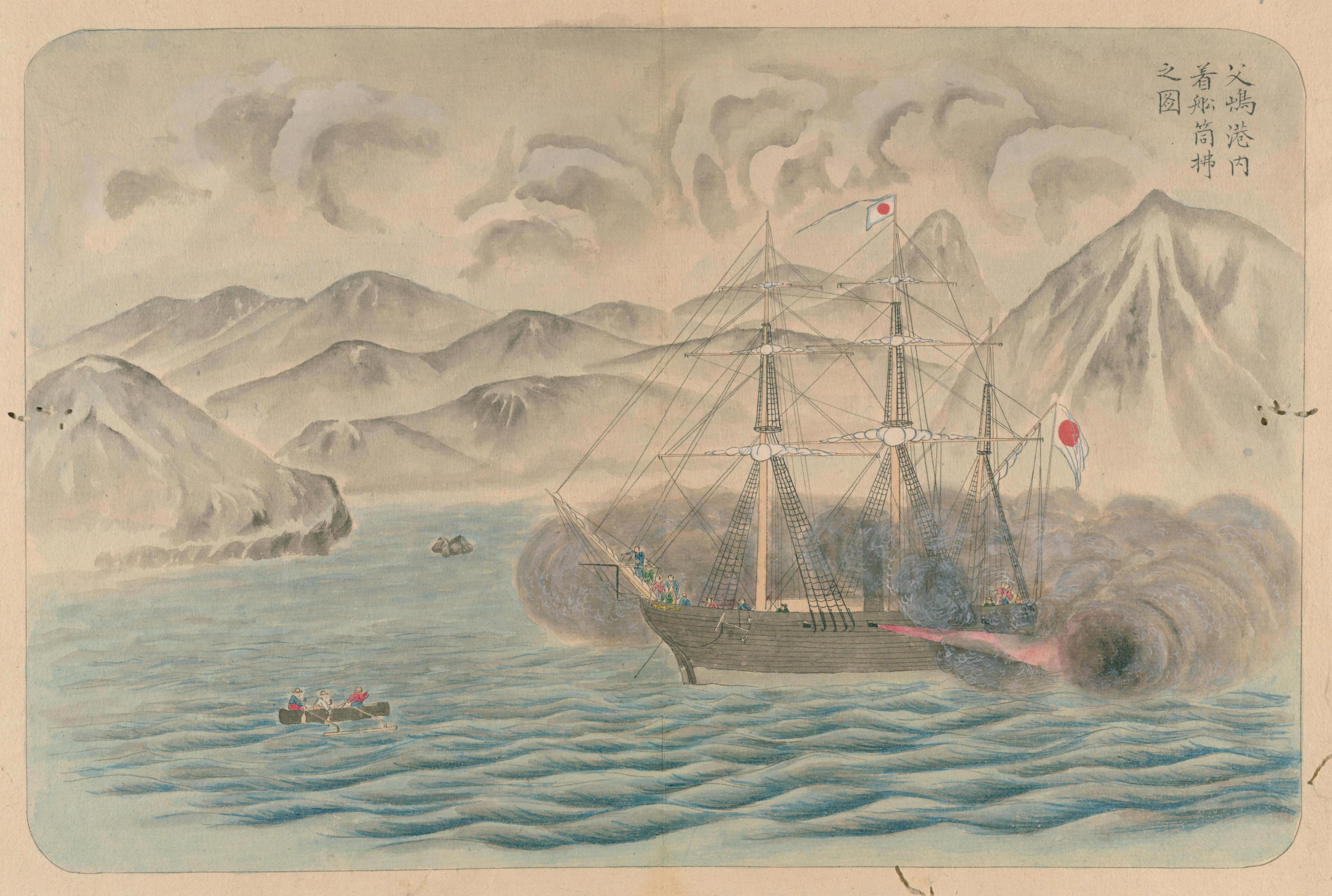
Illustration of Kanrin Maru entering Chichijima port c.1861

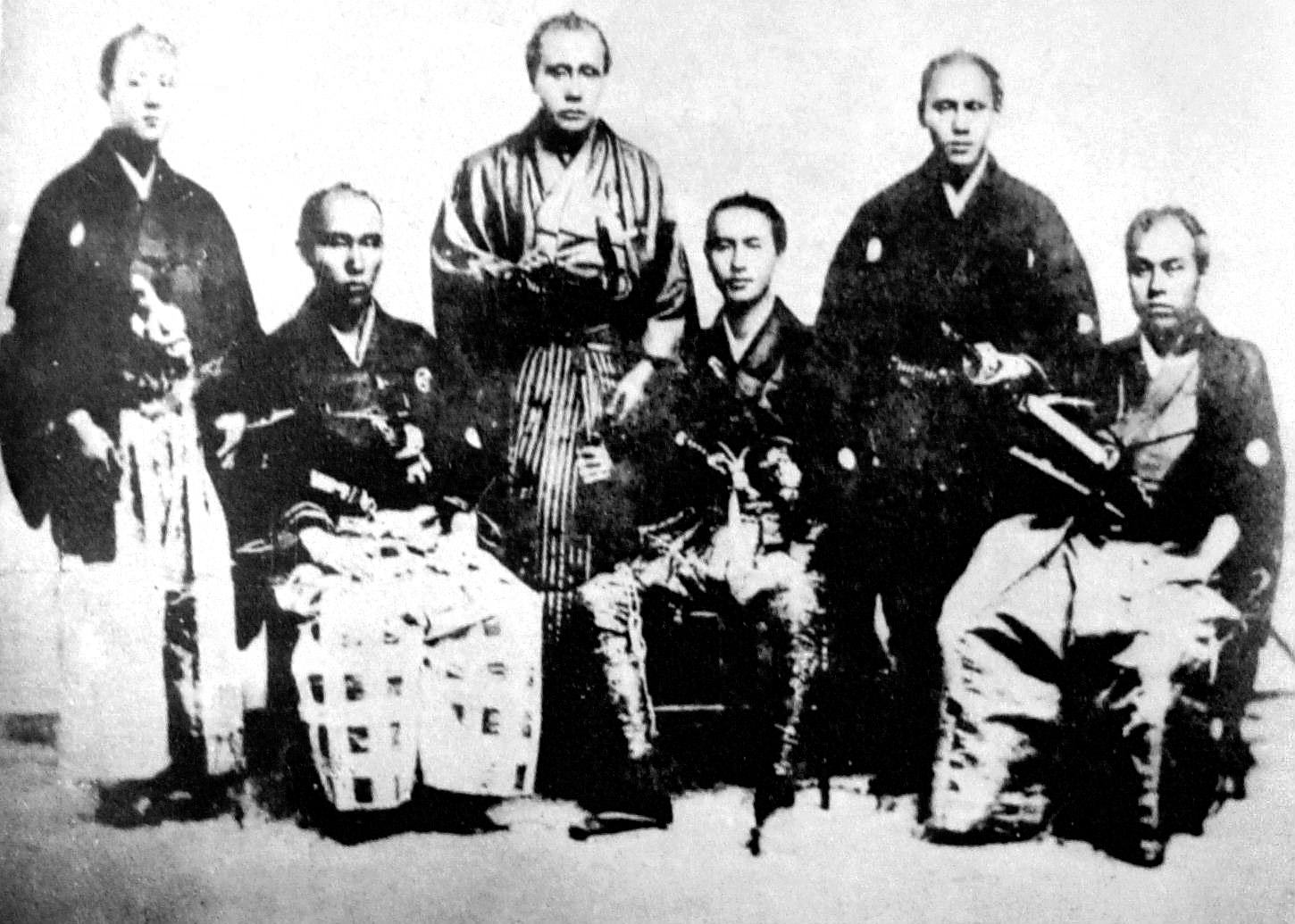
Members of the Japanese Embassy to the United States (1860).

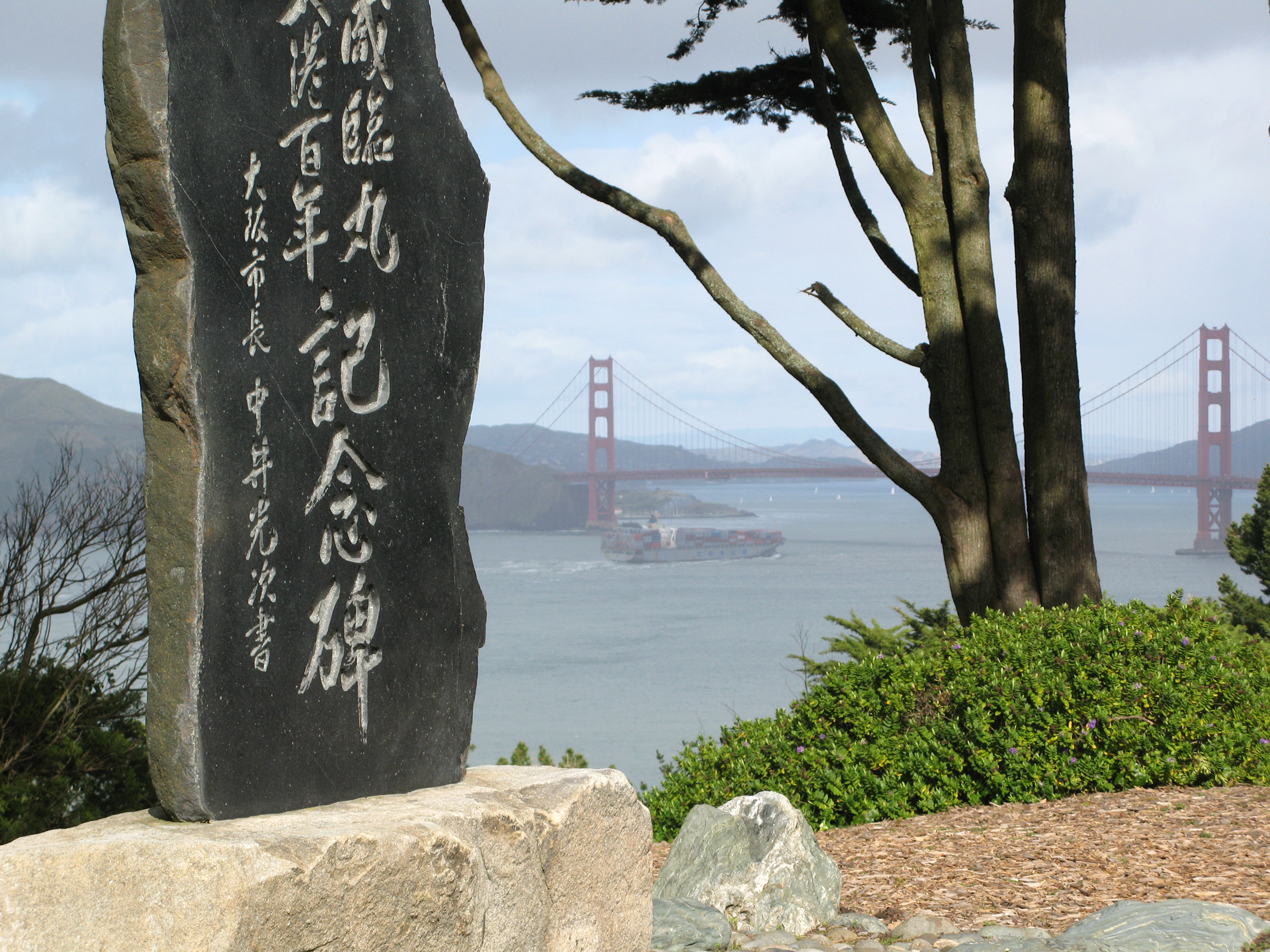
The Kanrin Maru monument in San Francisco.

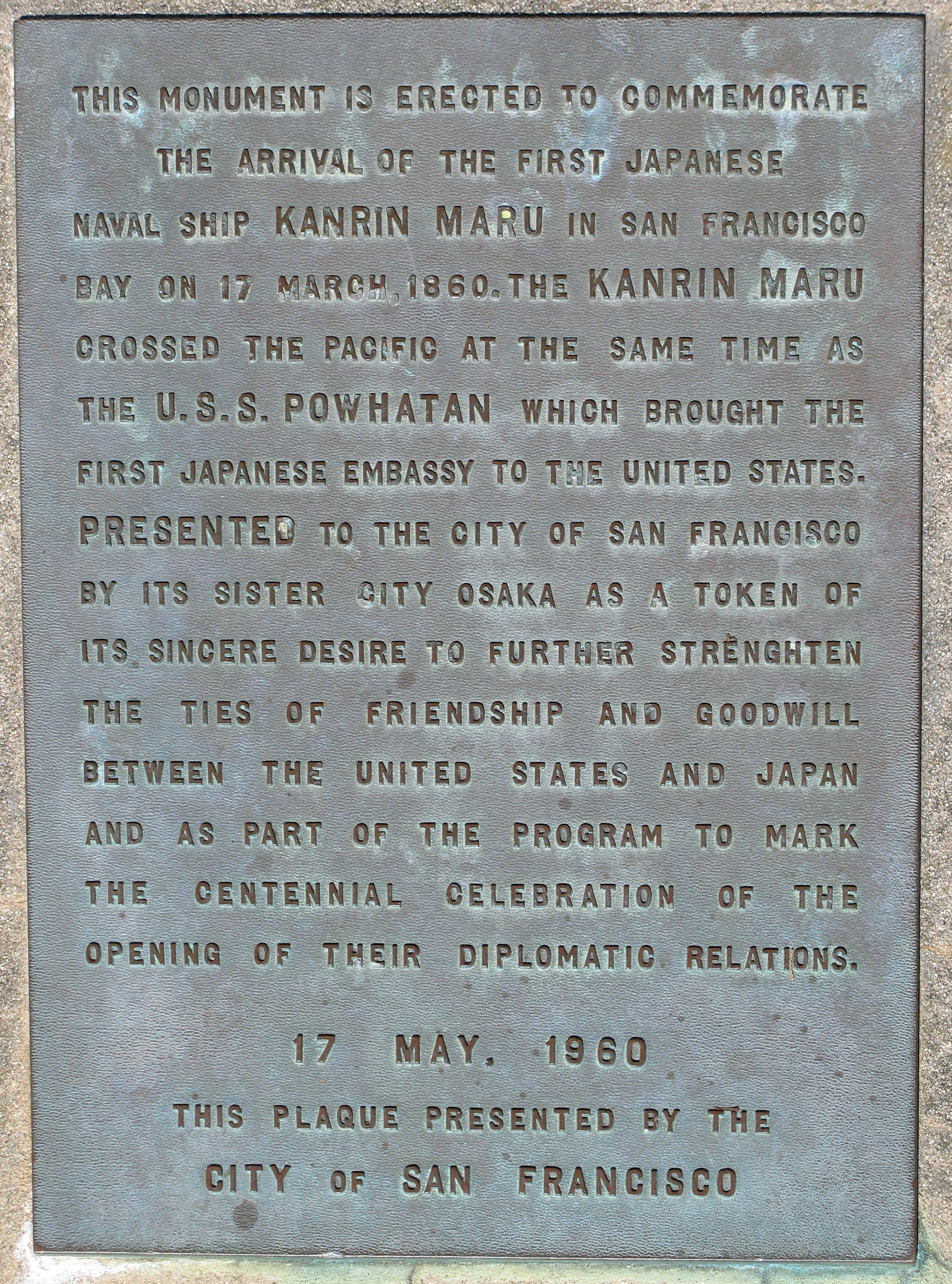
Plaque on the Monument

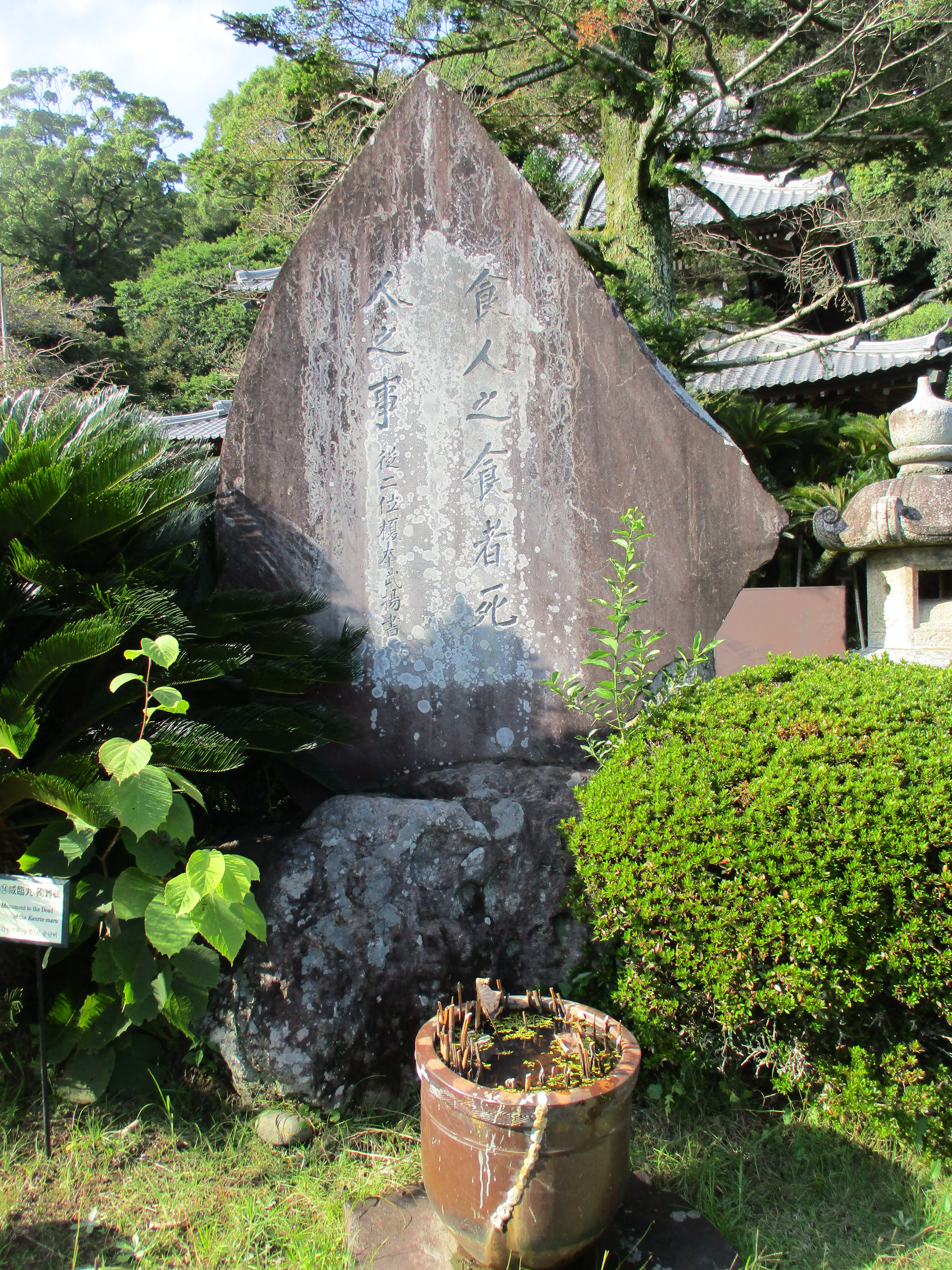
Kanin Maru Memorial at Seiken-ji

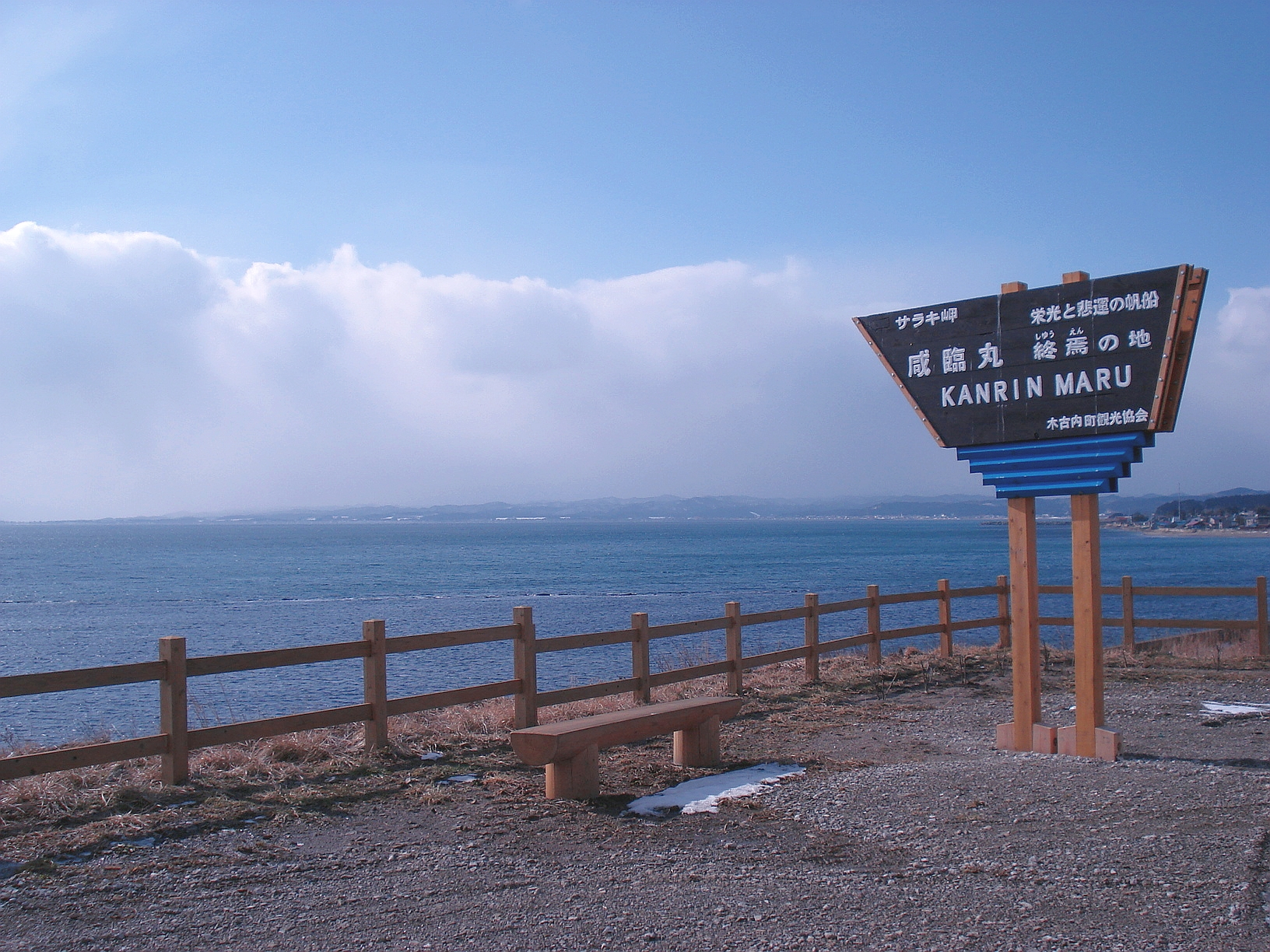
Kanin Maru marker at Cape Saraki

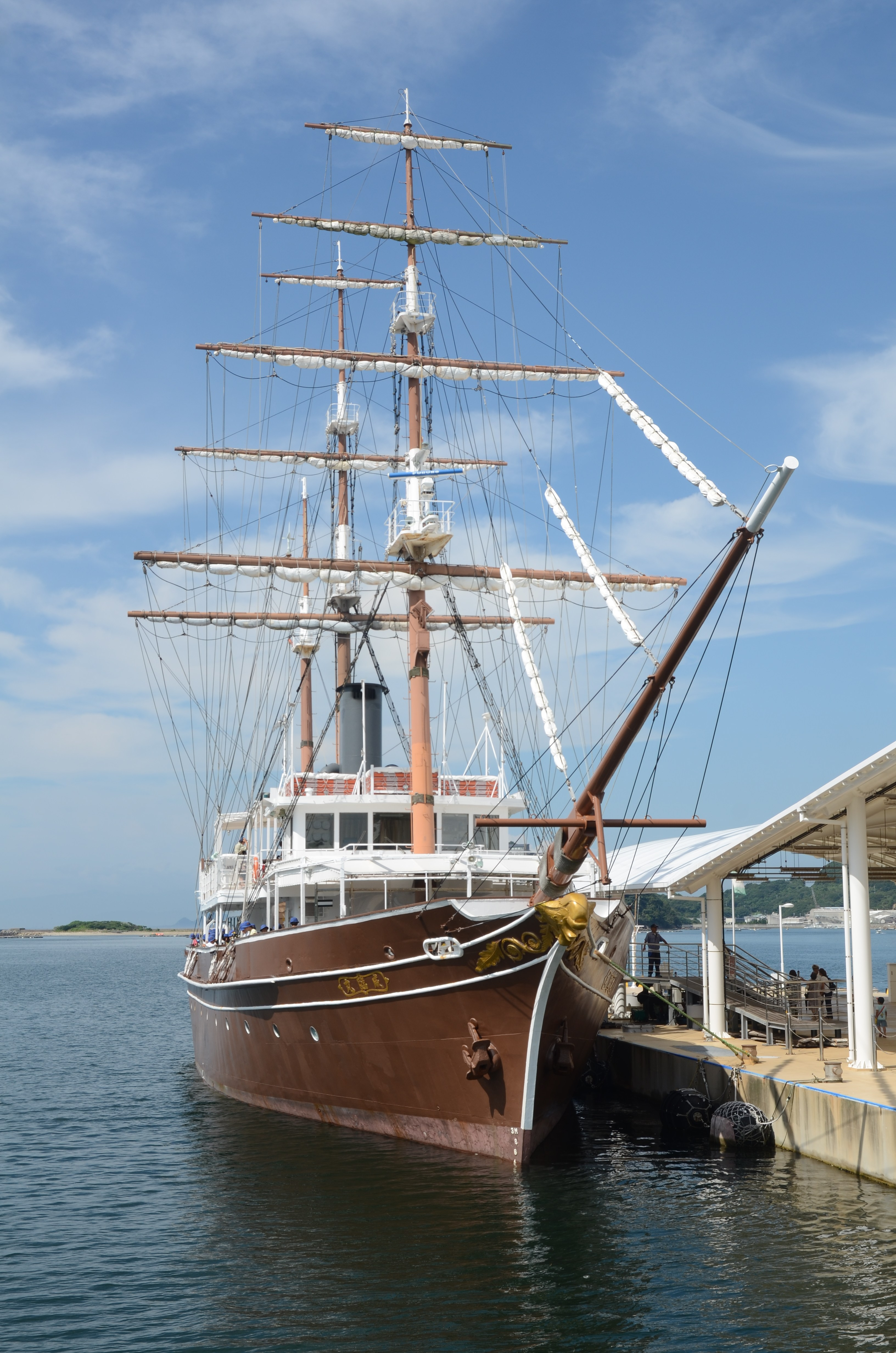
Kanin Maru replica in 2017
