= Bali-class sloop =

Dutch class of steam corvettes

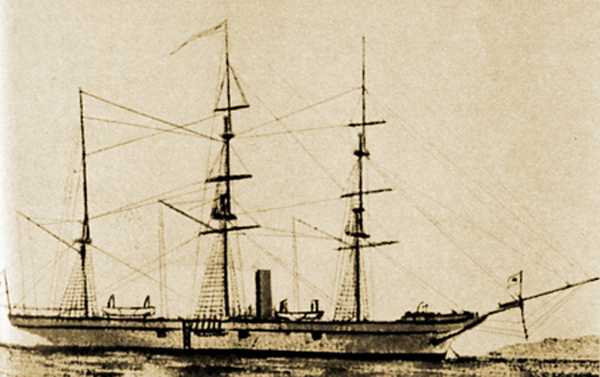
- Kanrin Maru of the Bali class

Class overview
- Name: Bali class
- Builders: L. Smit en Zoon Kinderdijk, Rijkswerf Vlissingen, De Merwede Dordrecht
- Operators: Royal Netherlands Navy; Tokugawa Shogunate
- Preceded by: Montrado
- Succeeded by: Vesuvius-class sloop
- Completed: 5

General characteristics
- Displacement: 620 tons
- Length: 41.00 m (134 ft 6 in)(p/p)
- Beam: 8.50 m (27 ft 11 in)(outer side)
- Draught: 3.40 m (11 ft 2 in) - 3.85 m (12 ft 8 in)
- Installed power: 100 nominal horsepower
- Speed: 8.5 knots (15.7 km/h)
- Complement: 85-100

The Bali class was a ship class of sloops of the Royal Netherlands Navy and Imperial Japanese Navy. The class comprised Bali, Kanrin Maru, Soembing, Chōyō Maru and Denryū Maru.

== Dutch and Japanese Naval Plans in the 1850s ==
=== Dutch program for screw propulsion ===
Under the 1852 naval program, the Dutch shifted to using screw propulsion in their navy. The smallest type of ship of the 1852 program was Vuurpijl. She would have 70 nominal hp, and was later known as Montrado. Shortly after her launch the 70 nominal hp configuration of Montrado proved too small for her intended role. This is how the plan for a somewhat larger type of ship came up.

In May 1855 the new minister for the navy De Smit van den Broecke presented the overall 'Plan 1855' for the fleet at home and in the East Indies. The heaviest ships of the new fleet would be 3 screw steam frigates of 400 hp, 50 guns and 500 men, to be stationed in the Netherlands. The standard fighting warship for the East Indies would be a screw corvette of 250 hp, 12 30-pounders and 125 men, of which 12 would be built. For policing the many outposts in the Indies 15 'screw steamships' of 100 hp, 12 guns and 85 men would be built. These would be supplemented by small paddle ships that would navigate rivers and shallow waters.

The ships of the Bali class fit the 100 hp 'screw steamships' of the 1855 plan.

=== The Japanese fleet program ===
From 1639 onward, the Dutch had been the only western power allowed to trade in Japan. By the early nineteenth century other western powers also attempted to gain access to Japan. On 8 July 1853 the American Commodore Perry visited Japan for the first time, and threatened to use force if Japan would not open up to trade. Shortly after, Japan asked the Netherlands for ships to counter the threat. On August 22, 1854, the Dutch paddle-steamer Soembing arrived in Nagasaki. She was almost brand new, and made a good impression on the Japanese. The Dutch and Japanese then started a plan and treaty that involved the creation of a modern Japanese navy and a strengthening of the Dutch (trade) position in Japan and on Dejima.

Creating a modern mid-nineteenth century navy from scratch was a huge project. It required hundreds of people to be educated in naval sciences, the underlying natural sciences, and the science and crafts of sailing and maintaining ships. To start this, the Dutch sent a detachment of officers and men to instruct the Japanese. In order to have training material Japan would buy a handful of Dutch merchant and warships. The Japanese government primarily thought about screw warships.

In a February 1855 report, the minister of the colonies cited Captain-lt Fabius about the type of ship that he thought to be required by Japan. Fabius thought of a flush-deck corvette of 10-12 guns and 100 hp. The minister for the navy stated that such a ship could not be bought, and therefore had to be built. There was no space at the state shipyards, and therefore the work had to be relegated to a private shipyard. This would take time, and therefore a plan was made. In 1855 Fabius would again go to Japan to teach. In 1856 a very large scale model of the screw corvette would be delivered. In 1857 the screw corvette would be delivered. Of course the corvette had to be constructed in such a way that it could also be used in the Dutch navy, if the deal would somehow be cancelled.

Shortly after the order for the screw corvette was communicated, the Japanese government expressed its desire to buy a second corvette. Delivery for this second ship was planned for 1858. Meanwhile, local Dutch officials proposed to gift a steamship to the Japanese while these corvettes were on order. During a second visit to Japan Soembing was therefore handed over to the Japanese government on 25 August 1855 and renamed Kankō Maru. Kankō Maru was suitable as an instruction ship. As a side-wheeler she also required less maintenance than a screw ship, and did not require a dry dock.

== Ordering and Construction ==
=== Orders for the first two ships ===
The first attempts to build small screw propelled ships, Medusa and Vuurpijl / Montrado, were initially not successful. The combination with the already high workload at the state shipyards then probably gave the naval minister the courage to attempt construction by a private shipyard. On 3 July 1855 the minister for the navy De Smit van den Broecke defended the final navy budget for 1855, including Plan 1855, in the first chamber of the House of Representatives. He explained that two ships of a completely new type (that of 100 hp) had been ordered at Fijenoord. The step to contract with Fijenoord had been taken because it was especially important to get machinery right. The shipyard was free to subcontract others. Later in 1855 it became known that construction of the hull of one of these ships had been subcontracted to another shipyard, Fop Smit in Kinderdijk, his shipyard later became known as L. Smit en Zoon.

=== Construction ===
Shipyard Fijenoord contracting with Fop Smit in Kinderdijk was not unusual. Fop Smit had gained a good reputation in building modern ships. Fijenoord was specialized in engines and iron ships, making it more costly to construct the wooden hulls for the Bali's at her own yard at Fijenoord. To the public it meanwhile seemed as if both ships were getting constructed for the Dutch navy. In early 1856 the lead ship Bali was expected to be finished in April, and commissioned May 1. This would have amounted to an unusually short time between launch and commissioning, and indeed this news proved false. However the name of the lead ship was now public.

The next news about the Bali class was that in early April 1856 a 1/40 scale model of Bali was almost finished. Two model makers had worked on it for 1.5 years, and now it would be sent to The Hague, and then to Japan as a gift to the emperor. Bali, with machines made by Fijenoord, was then launched on 8 October 1856.

Shortly after the news about the model of Bali, in May 1856, it had become known that Huyssen van Kattendijke would sail a screw schooner to Japan. It was under construction for Japan on a Dutch private shipyard and would leave in September 1856. On 12 November 1856, Fop Smit then launched a 'screw schooner of war' with machines by Fijenoord. Giving a ship a name was an essential part of launching a ship, and so it was kind of obvious that strange things were happening. In January 1857 it finally became known that Huyssen van Kattendijke would sail the steamship Japan, which had been built for the Japanese government in the Netherlands, to Japan. Japan would be renamed Kanrin Maru on arrival in Japan.

Soembing was the third ship of the class. The name was a direct consequence of the criticism that the government received for giving away the paddle-steamer Soembing to Japan in August 1855. The construction of a new Soembing would make clear that the strength of the navy would not suffer from giving away the old ship. Soembing was laid down at the (state shipyard) Rijkswerf Vlissingen on 17 May 1856. On 29 November 1856 she was launched as the third ship of the class.

Chōyō Maru, built by Cornelis Gips in Dordrecht as Jedo, was the fourth ship of the Bali class. That is, Chōyō Maru was ordered within a few months of Kanrin Maru. She also had 100 hp engines. During ordering she was referred to as one of 'two screw corvettes' ordered by Japan. It's therefore very unlikely that she was built to a different design than Kanrin Maru. There is also a direct claim that she was built to the same specifications as Kanrin Maru. To be absolutely certain one would need measurements of Chōyō Maru.

Denryū Maru, built by Cornelis Gips in Dordrecht as Nagasaki, was the fifth ship of the Bali class. That is, she was built by the same order, at the same time and by the same shipyard. There is also a clear statement that it was built to the same model as Chōyō Maru. Denryū Maru also had engines by Fijenoord.

== Characteristics of the Bali class ==
The Dutch navy was rather inconsistent in classifying its ships. This was especially true for the smaller charters, and was further complicated by politics, changes in technology, and changes to armament and sail plans. The Bali class was especially affected by this. As a name for the type the Dutch first talked about a 'screw corvette', then a war steamer, and then a screw schooner. Before being commissioned Bali was in one group with Montrado as Schooners with steam power.

When the Dutch navy introduced the classes, Bali and Soembing were classified as screw steamships fourth class in 1857. This continued in 1858, 1859, and 1860. In 1861 Soembing then became a screw ship 3rd class, while Bali remained a screw ship 4th class. In 1866 this was reverted, and Bali (and Montrado) also became screw steam ships 3rd class. The event of 1861 suggests that Bali and Soembing were ships of a different type. This is not the case, even though the different classification might have had a reasonable temporary cause, probably in the armament the ships carried.

In the more or less final classification of Dutch screw steamships, the steam corvettes became 2nd class, the gunvessels were rated 4th class, and the Bali class was rated in the 3rd class. The ships of the third class were called 'sloops' in English. An English sloop class of a size comparable to the Bali class was e.g. the Swallow-class sloop.

=== Design ===
The dimensions of Bali and Soembing are given by Tideman. Bali was given as long 40.80 m on the water line, and Soembing 41.10. Beam on the waterline outside the hull was 8.74 and 8.52 m, depth 3.28 and 3.38 m. Displacement was 604 and 608 ton. The big difference with the preceding Montrado of 40.0 m and 400 ton, was that Montrado had a draught of only 2.68 m. Furthermore, the Bali class were about twice as small as the next bigger ships, the Medusa class of Corvettes with auxiliary power.

The unknown exact measurements of Japan and slight differences in measurements between Bali and Soembing create some doubt about whether the Bali class was really of one design. However, from the trials of Bali, there is a statement that: 'The Bali is in all parts shaped the same shape as the screw steamship recently built for Japan'. This is also a logical explanation for sending a model of Bali to Japan, instead of a model of Japan herself.

The differences between Bali and Soembing have two explanations. For Bali a design drawing gives some measurements. Length between perpendiculars: 41.00 m, beam on the outside of the inhouten (frames?) 8.50 m, draught: 3.40-3.85 m, depth of hold 5.00 m. For Soembing there is also a blueprint, it has: Length between perpendiculars 41.00 m, beam inside the hull 8.40 m, depth of hold inside 4.80 m, draught 3.50-3.90 m. It shows that both ships were designed with the same length, and Tideman later noted different lengths caused by how deeply the ships were immersed. A real difference in the hull of Soembing was that it had a fuller bow, so guns could be placed to fire straight ahead.

=== Armament ===
In 1859 the armament plan for the Bali class foresaw 4 long 12-pdr cannon and 4 30-pdr carronades, weighing 9,850 kg ((4*1,500)+(4*960)=9,840) This was probably put in place, because till 1861 Bali was noted to carry 8 guns. Soembing was planned to start out with the same armament of 4 long 12-pdr and 4 30-pdr carronades.

In 1869, Bali had 10 guns: 2 long 12-pdr cannon and 8 30-pdr carronades, weighing ((2*1,500)+(8*960))=10,680 kg. By then the armament of Soembing differed significantly from that of Bali. Soembing then had 2 16 cm RML and 4 medium 30-pdr No 1 or 2. The 16 cm RML weighed 1,792 kg, the medium 30-pdr weighed 1,650 kg, so total weight was ((2*1,792)+(4*1,650)=) 10,184 kg.

A different armament for Soembing could have caused her re-classification as a 3rd class screw steam ship. The re-armament which was visible in 1869 gave her the same armament that some Vesuvius-class sloops later had. If one considers that the Vesuvius class was designed because the Bali class could not mount a heavy battery, it seems logical that Soembing got in the same class as the Vesuvius when she was able to mount the same armament. However, the re-classification of Soembing took place on 1 January 1861. It seems that at that time the armament of Bali, Soembing and Vesuvius was the same.

=== Propulsion ===
The Bali class had machines of 100 nominal horsepower made by Fijenoord. The diameter of the cylinder was 81.2 cm, stroke 68.5 cm. The boilers were designed to allow 75 turns. The first propeller that Bali used, was only 2.74 m diameter, and would allow verification of this design. During the first trial, on the Meuse, the engine indeed made 74-75 turns while pressure was 15 kg / square inch. The slip of the small propeller was 33%, much too high. As a consequence Bali made only 7.8 knots (14.4 km/h). Now the second (normally the reserve) propeller was made for Bali. This bigger propeller got a 3 m diameter and speed of 4.87 m.

In May 1857 Bali made her second trials in Hellevoetsluis, using the bigger propeller. With an average load she made 8.25 knots (15.28 km/h). The boilers had a pressure of 12 kg and a vacuum of 25.5–26 cm, while the propeller made 60-62 turns. The slip of the propeller was now only 16%, which was low for such a small ship. The machines worked very smoothly, and the ship responded very well to the rudder. In all probability the firemen could heat the boilers till 15 kg pressure, turning up the machine to make 65 turns. Bali would then attain the designed speed of 8.5 knots (15.7 km/h).

The Bali class were nevertheless meant to sail most of the time. The first reports about the sailing qualities of Kanrin Maru were very positive.

== Construction ==
| Name | Built by | Laid down | Launched | Commissioned | Fate |
|---|---|---|---|---|---|
| Bali | L. Smit en Zoon, Kinderdijk | September 1855 | 8 October 1856 | 16 March 1857 | Decommissioned. c. April 1877 |
| Kanrin Maru 咸臨 (ex-Japan) | L. Smit en Zoon, Kinderdijk | ? | 12 November 1856 | 26 March 1857 (sailed) | Lost 1871 |
| Soembing | Rijkswerf Vlissingen | 17 May 1856 | 29 November 1856 | 3 October 1857 | Coal hulk 1872 |
| Chōyō Maru 朝陽 (ex-Jedo) | Cornelis Gips, Dordrecht | ? | 20 August 1857 | 21 January 1858 (sailed) | Sunk 11 May 1869 |
| Denryū Maru 電流 (ex-Nagasaki) | Cornelis Gips, Dordrecht | ? | 3 September 1857 | 3 May 1858 (sailed) | |
