= Ruth Rubin =

Canadian-American folklorist and Yiddish scholar (1906–2000)

- Born: Rivke Rosenblatt; September 1, 1906; Montreal, Quebec (or perhaps Khotyn, Bessarabia [Russian Empire, now Ukraine])
- Died: June 11, 2000 (aged 93); Mamaroneck, New York
- Occupations: folk singer, folkorist, scholar, poet

Academic background
- Education: Union Institute and University
- Thesis: The Jewish woman and her Yiddish folksong (1976)

Academic work
- Discipline: Yiddish studies

Ruth Rubin (September 1, 1906 – June 11, 2000) was a Canadian-American folklorist, singer, poet, and scholar of Yiddish culture and music.

== Early life ==
Born Rivke Rosenblatt in 1906 in Khotin, Bessarabia, she grew up speaking Yiddish, English and French. Her parents had immigrated to Canada from Bessarabia, then part of the Russian Empire; she had at least one sibling, a sister Esther. She attended the city's public schools, as well as the Peretz Shule, a secular Yiddish school, where she saw Sholom Aleichem speak in 1915 and was deeply affected. In 1924, she moved to New York where she studied music and attended night school at Hunter College while working as a secretary and stenographer.

== Contributions ==
Around 1935 Rubin decided to become a Yiddish folklorist and sought out Chaim Zhitlowsky (1865–1943), a prominent Yiddish scholar and writer for guidance. She began her research at the YIVO Institute for Jewish Research, the New York Public Library and the archives of the Jewish Theological Seminary. In addition to teaching music and poetry in Yiddish schools in the city, she also began publishing in journals. During World War II, she translated Yiddish diaries that were smuggled out of European ghettos and concentration camps.

From about 1947 on, Rubin began to conduct serious fieldwork within the Jewish community of immigrants in New York City, Montreal and Toronto, focusing on the displaced persons who had arrived from Europe following the Holocaust.

Rubin's work is considered deeply significant as she began gathering folksong and Yiddish folktales at a time when there was very little interest in Yiddish culture. She gathered thousands of songs over the next twenty years from a generation of survivors who had nearly been annihilated by Nazism and later Stalinist repression. In tandem with this work, Rubin continued her studies in Yiddish language and history with scholar Max Weinreich.

In addition to her work as a collector, Rubin also organized and performed in recitals of Yiddish folksongs and hosted salons in her Grammercy Park Avenue apartment. As part of the folk revival movement, she performed at New York's Town Hall and Carnegie Recital Hall, participated in Expo 67, and appeared in folk concerts with Pete Seeger, Paul Robeson and Ronnie Gilbert. She was also heavily involved in the Jewish Music Forum and the National Jewish Music Council and fostered international scholarly relations with folklorists in Israel and Europe.

== Legacy ==
Irene Heskes (1923–1999) praised Rubin's "prodigious dedication" to collecting and preserving Yiddish culture and song, ranking her as one of the leading Yiddish collector-scholars of the twentieth century. Rubin's performance style was described as "simple and unaffected" and contemporaries report that she saw performance more as an act of cultural transmission rather than artistic expression.

Rubin recorded many of the songs she collected and was a recording artist from the 1940s through to the 1980s. Often working Moses Asch, she also released several collections under Oriole and her own imprint. She recorded collaborations with Pete Seeger, Fred Hellerman, Dick Weissman and Hedy West.

Rubin deposited her field recordings in various archives and research libraries in the United States (Library of Congress, YIVO, Wayne State University), Canada (Canadian Museum of History), and Israel, where they now constitute important archival research collections. Fellow scholars such as Steven Zeitlin of the New York Center for Urban Folk Culture praised Rubin's work as she collected songs from informants who had learned songs in their original context.

== Personal life ==
In 1932, Rosenblatt married Harry Rubin. The two had a son named Michael in 1937, who died in 1959. Her husband died in 1971. She died in 2000.

== Awards ==
- Lifetime Achievement Award, Yiddish Folk Arts Program 1989

== Selected bibliography ==
- Rosenblatt, Rivke; Niger, Samuel (1929). Lider. Nyu Yorḳ: Y.L. Magid.
- Rosenblatt, Rivke (1948). Dos Yidishe folkslid: kurtse ilustrirte lektsie. New York: National Jewish Music Council.
- Rubin, Ruth (1947). "Literature on Jewish music". Jewish Book Annual. 6: 64–70.
- Rubin, Ruth. Yiddish riddles and problems. New York: Folklore Quarterly.
- Rubin, Ruth (1948). The Yiddish folksong of the East European Jews. New York: National Jewish Music Council, sponsored by National Jewish Welfare Board.
- Rubin, Ruth (1952). "Nineteenth-Century Yiddish Folksongs of Children in Eastern Europe". The Journal of American Folklore. 65 (257): 227–254. doi:10.2307/537076. ISSN 0021-8715. JSTOR 537076.
- Rubin, Ruth; Bikel, Theodore (1956). "Folk Songs of Israel". The Journal of American Folklore. 69 (274): 418. doi:10.2307/536373. ISSN 0021-8715. JSTOR 536373.
- Rubin, Ruth; Post, Ruth; Herzl Rome, T (1950). A treasury of Jewish folksong. New York: Schocken: Verlag nicht ermittelbar.
- Rubin, Ruth (1952). Nineteenth-century Yiddish folksongs of children in Eastern Europe. Richmond, Va.
- Rubin, Ruth (1959). Nineteenth-century history in Yiddish folksong.
- Rubin, Ruth (1960). "Yiddish Folk Songs Current in French Canada". Journal of the International Folk Music Council. 12: 76–78. doi:10.2307/835442. ISSN 0950-7922. JSTOR 835442.
- Rubin, Ruth (1960). Some aspects of Comparative Jewish Folksong. Bloomington: s.n.
- Rubin, Ruth (1960). Sholem Aleichem and Yiddish folksongs. New York: Sing out Inc.
- Rubin, Ruth (1961). Yiddish folksongs of immigration and the melting pot. New York: New York Folklore Quarterly.
- Rubin, Ruth (1963). Voices of a people, Yiddish folk song., Ruth Rubin. New York; London: T. Yoseloff.
- Rubin, Ruth (1965). Jewish folk songs in Yiddish and English. New York.
- Rubin, Ruth (1965). "A comparative approach to a Yiddish song of protest". Studies in Ethnomusicology. 2: 54–74.
- Rubin, Ruth (1966). Slavic influences in Yiddish folk songs. Hatboro, Pa.
- Rubin, Ruth (1966). Yiddish sayings and some parallels from the sayings of other peoples. Ithaca, N.Y.: New York Folklore Society.
- Rubin, Ruth; Workman's circle (U.S.); Education Department (1967). Warsaw Ghetto program. New York: Education Dept. of the Workmen's Circle.
- Rubin, Ruth (1974). The Yiddish folksong: an illustrated lecture. New York: Jewish Music Council of the National Jewish Welfare Board.
- Rubin, Ruth (1975). Yiddish folksongs of social significance.
- Rubin, Ruth; Union Institute & University (1976). The Jewish woman and her Yiddish folksong (Thesis).
- Rubin, Ruth (1989). Jewish folk songs: in Yiddish and English. New York: Published by the author.
- Rubin, Ruth; Slobin, Mark (2000). Voices of a people: the story of Yiddish folksong. ISBN 978-0-252-06918-5.

== Selected discography ==
- Rubin, Ruth (1978). Yiddish folksongs sung by Ruth Rubin. Folkways.
- Rubin, Ruth; Hellerman, Fred (1958). Yiddish Love Songs Sung By Ruth Rubin. Washington Records.
- Rubin, Ruth (1959). Jewish and Israeli folk songs. Folkways Records.
- Rubin, Ruth; Rady, Gertrude. Jewish Folk Songs Of Eastern Europe. Farbenkt. Farbenkt. Disc.
- Rubin, Ruth; Rady, Gertrude. Jewish Folk Songs Of Eastern Europe. Mit A Nodl. Mit A Nodl. Disc.
- Rubin, Ruth. Jewish Folk Songs Of Palestine Zirmu Galim. Asch.
- פוסט, רות; Post, Ruth. Jewish folk songs. New York: Oriole Records.
- Rubin, Ruth (1900). Kegn gold fun zun; Zhankoye. New York: Asch Records.
- Rubin, Ruth; Rady, Gertrude (1900). Jewish folk songs of Palestine. New York: Asch Records.
- Rubin, Ruth. Jewish Folk Songs Of Eastern Europe Zhankoye (Crimea). Asch.
- Rubin, Ruth; Ziegenlaub, W (1930). Meydlakh dray far a niḳel. New York: Columbia Graphophone Co.
- Rubin, Ruth; Ziegenlaub, W. Geṿald ikh ṿil a boḥur = Gwald ich will a bucher. Camden: Victor Talking Machine Company.
- Rubin, Ruth; Ziegenlaub, W (1930). Leydis foirst = Ladies first. Ṭshepe dikh op. New York?: Columbia Records.
