= Igor Bunich =

Russian historian

Igor Bunich (September 28, 1937 – June 15, 2000) was a Russian historian known for offering a number of revisionist interpretations of Russian history. He is most famous for claiming that Joseph Stalin was actively preparing to invade western Europe in 1941 before any suggestion of the German eastward assault in Operation Barbarossa.

== Operatsia Groza ==
Bunich published three volumes with the title "Operatsia Groza"—"Operation Thunderstorm"—the first one in 1994, the last one posthumously in 2004. In these books he communicates a plan of Stalin for an invasion of whole Western Europe: "Operation Thunderstorm".
