= Leslie Crofford =

American rheumatologist

Leslie J. Crofford is a professor at Vanderbilt University and the 2011 recipient of the Woman in Inflammation Science award from the International Association of Inflammation Societies. She continues to practice and research Rheumatology.

Crofford received her Bachelors of Arts in Chemistry at Vanderbilt University in May 1980. She went on to receive her MD at University of Tennessee's College of Medicine in June 1984.

After completing her internship and residency at the Washington University School of Medicine in St. Louis, she became a medical staff fellow at the National Institutes of Health.
