= Alex Berman =

American historian (1914–2000)

Alex Berman (February 7, 1914 – June 29, 2000) was professor emeritus of history and of historical studies in pharmacy at the University of Cincinnati. He was a specialist in the history of French pharmacy. His papers are kept at the Lloyd Library and Museum. He was the recipient of the Kremers Award for excellence in the history of pharmacy.

Berman received a pharmacy degree from Fordham University in the 1930s. He served as a pharmacist with the United States Army Air Forces during World War II. He then studied the history of pharmacy at the University of Wisconsin where he earned his Ph.D. in 1954.
