= Nakahama Manjirō =

Japanese samurai and translator

- 中濱 万次郎
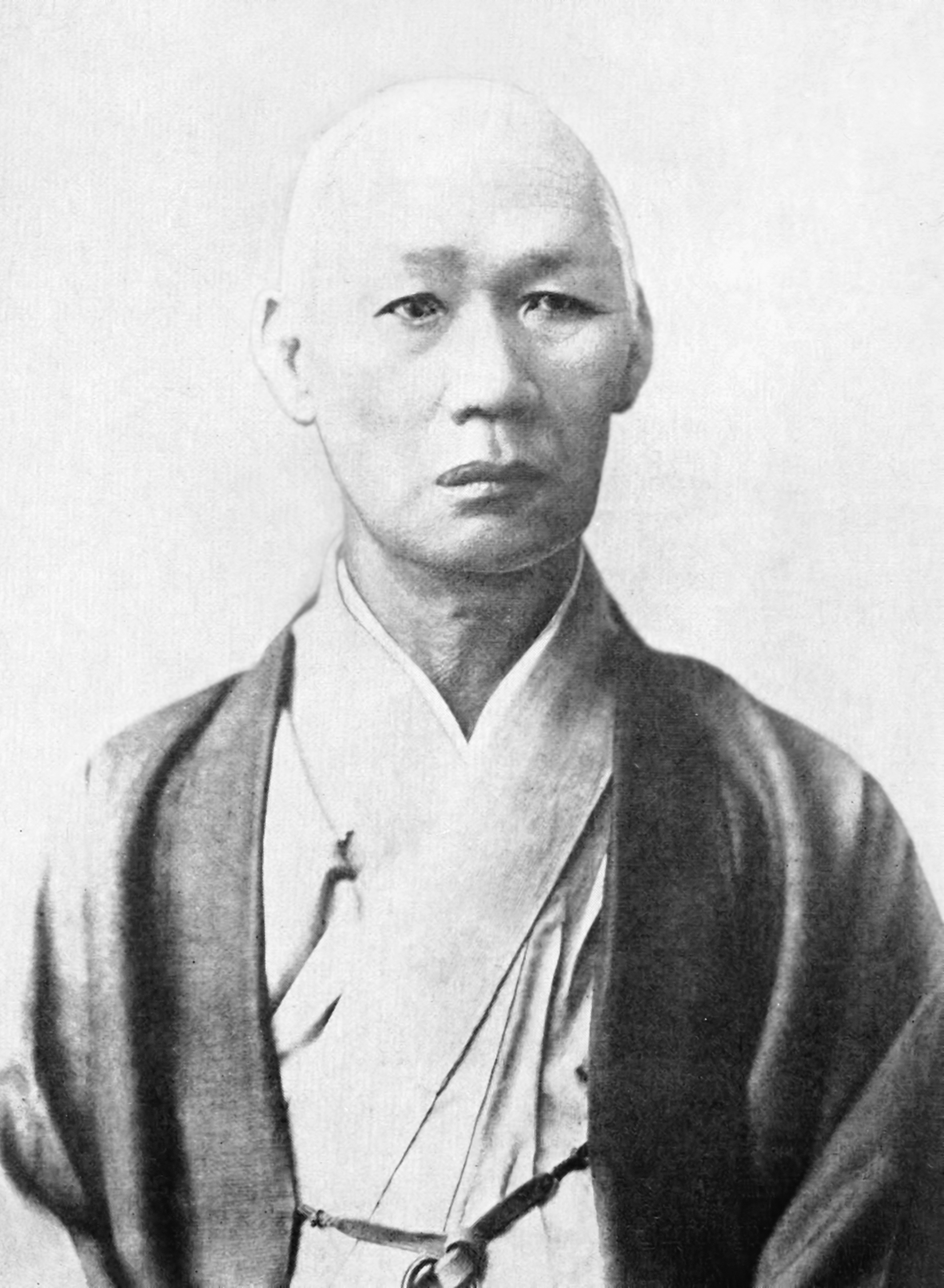
- Manjirō c. 1880
- Born: January 27, 1827; Nakanohama, Kochi, Tosa, Japan
- Died: November 12, 1898 (aged 71); Tokyo, Japan
- Other name: John Mung

Nakahama Manjirō (中濱 万次郎; January 27, 1827 – November 12, 1898), also known as John Manjirō (or John Mung), was a Japanese samurai and translator who was one of the first Japanese people to visit the United States and an important translator during the opening of Japan.

He was a fisherman before his journey to the United States, where he studied English and navigation and became a sailor and gold miner. After returning to Japan, he was elevated to the status of a samurai and was made a hatamoto. He served his country as an interpreter and translator and was instrumental in negotiating the Convention of Kanagawa. He also taught as a professor at the Tokyo Imperial University.

== Voyage to America ==
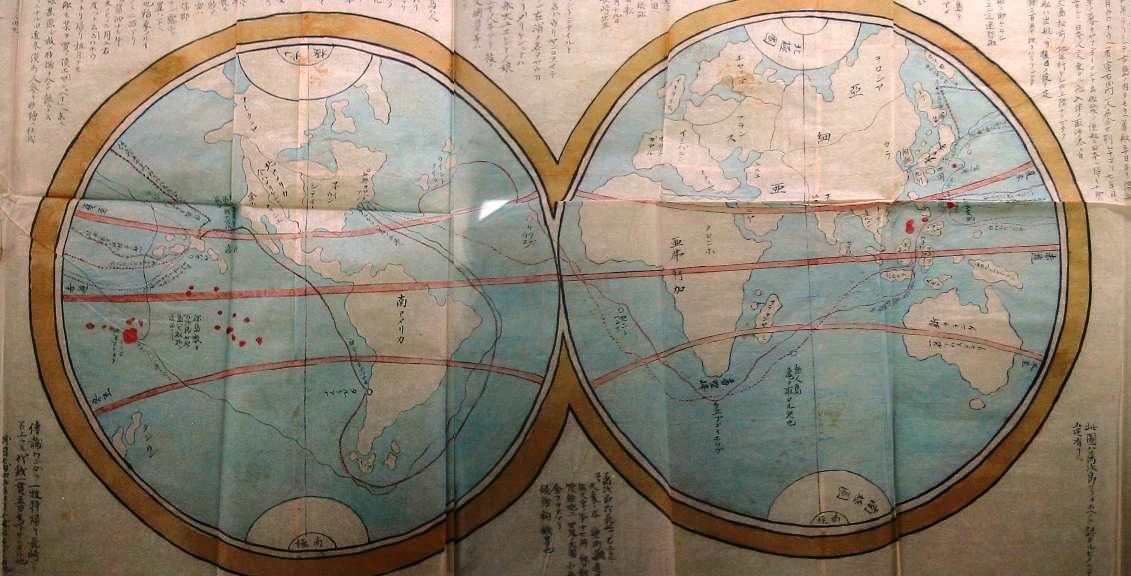
Nakahama Manjirō's report of his travels, 1850s, Tokyo National Museum.

During his early life, he lived as a simple fisherman in the village of Naka-no-hama, Tosa Province (now Tosashimizu, Kōchi Prefecture). In 1841, 14-year-old Nakahama Manjirō and four friends (four brothers named Goemon, Denzo, Toraemon, and Jusuke) were fishing when their boat was wrecked on the island of Torishima. The American whaleship John Howland, with Captain William H. Whitfield in command, rescued them. At the end of the voyage, four of them were left in Honolulu; however, Manjirō (nicknamed "John Mung") wanted to stay on the ship. Captain Whitfield took him back to the United States and briefly entrusted him to his neighbor Ebenezer Akin, who enrolled Manjirō in the Oxford School in the town of Fairhaven, Massachusetts. The boy studied English and navigation for a year, apprenticed to a cooper, and then, with Whitfield's help, signed on to the whaleship Franklin (Captain Ira Davis). After whaling in the South Seas, the Franklin put into Honolulu in October 1847, where Manjirō again met his four friends. None were able to return to Japan, for this was during Japan's period of isolation, when leaving the country was an offense punishable by death.

When Captain Davis became mentally ill and was left in Manila, the crew elected a new captain, and Manjirō was made boatsteerer (harpooner). The Franklin returned to New Bedford, Massachusetts in September 1849 and paid off its crew; Manjirō was self-sufficient, with $350 (~$13,545 in 2025) in his pocket.

Manjirō promptly set out by sea for the California Gold Rush. Arriving in San Francisco in May 1850, he took a steamboat up the Sacramento River, then went into the mountains. In a few months, he found enough gold to exchange for about 600 pieces of silver and decided to find a way back to Japan nearly a decade after being rescued from the island of Torishima.

== Return to Japan ==
Manjirō arrived in Honolulu and found two of his companions were willing to go with him. Toraemon, who thought it would be too risky, did not voyage back to Japan, and Jusuke had died of a heart ailment. Manjirō purchased a whaleboat, the Adventure, which was loaded aboard the bark Sarah Boyd (Captain Whitmore) along with gifts from the people of Honolulu. They sailed on December 17, 1850, and reached Okinawa on February 2, 1851. The three were promptly taken into custody, although treated with courtesy. After months of questioning, they were released in Nagasaki and eventually returned home to Tosa where Lord Yamauchi Toyoshige awarded them pensions. Manjirō was appointed a minor official and became a valuable source of information.

In September 1853, Manjirō was summoned to Edo (now known as Tokyo), questioned by the shogunate government, and made a hatamoto (a samurai in direct service to the shōgun). He would now give interviews only in service to the government. In token of his new status, he would wear two swords, and needed a surname; he chose Nakahama, after his home village.

In 1861, Manjirō was ordered to join the shogunate's expedition to the Bonin Islands, on which he acted as an interpreter.

== Service as a hatamoto ==
Manjirō detailed his travels in a report to the Tokugawa Shogunate, which is kept today at the Tokyo National Museum. On July 8, 1853, when Commodore Matthew Perry's Black Ships arrived to force the opening of Japan, Manjirō became an interpreter and translator for the Shogunate and was instrumental in negotiating the Convention of Kanagawa. However, it appears that he did not contact the Americans directly at that time.

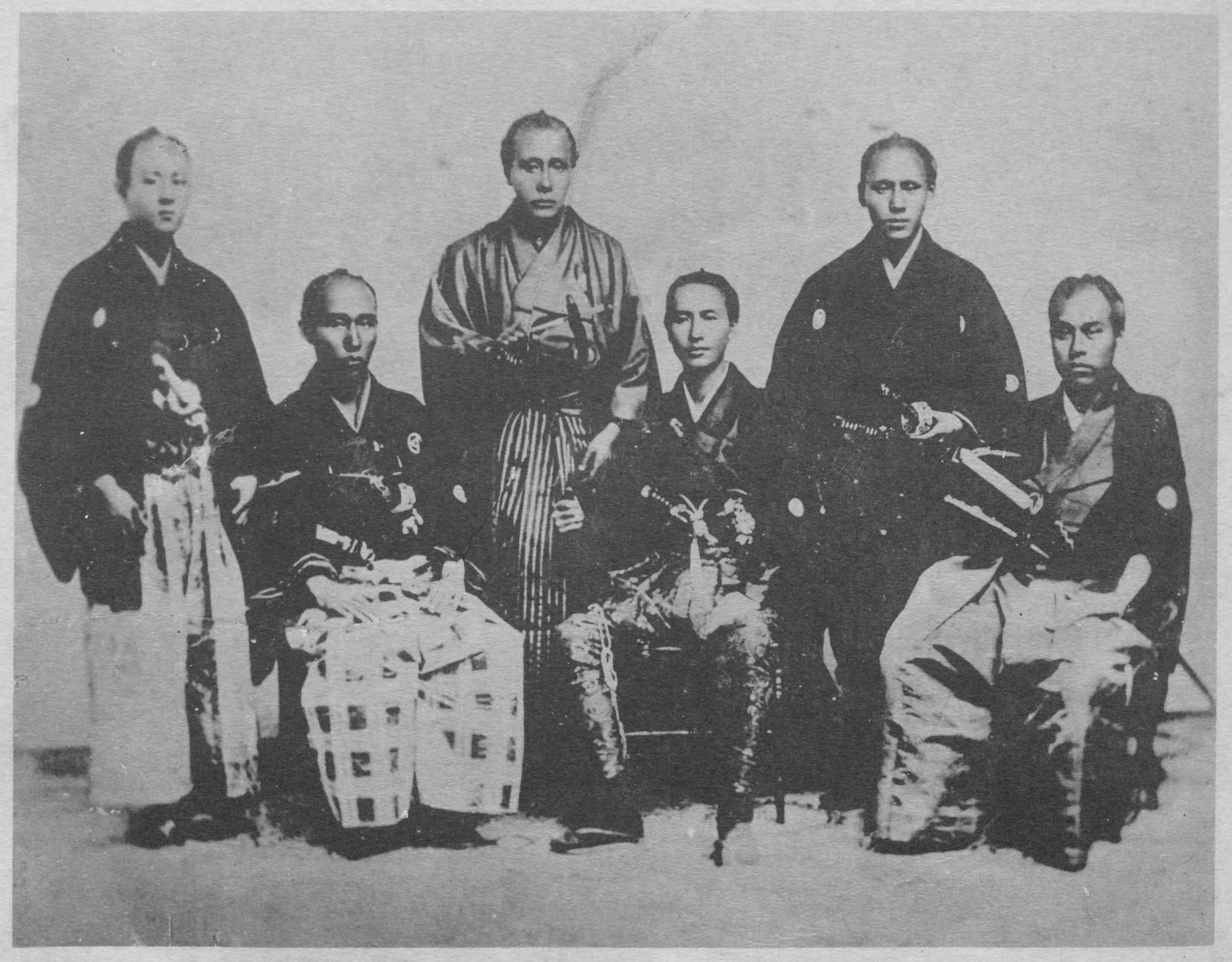
Members of the Japanese delegation to the United States in 1860, who sailed on the Kanrin Maru and the USS Powhatan.

In 1860, Nakahama Manjirō participated in the Japanese Embassy to the United States (1860). He was appointed translator on board Kanrin Maru, Japan's first screw-driven steam warship, purchased from the Dutch. Due to Japan's former policy of isolation, the crew had little experience on the open ocean, and during a storm, her Captain Katsu Kaishū, Admiral Kimura Kaishū and much of the crew fell ill. Manjirō was put in charge and brought the ship to port safely.

In 1870, during the Franco-Prussian War, Manjirō studied military science in Europe. He returned to Japan by way of the United States. He was formally received at Washington D.C., and he took advantage of this opportunity by traveling overland to Fairhaven, Massachusetts to visit his "foster father", Captain Whitfield. Eventually, Manjirō became a professor at the Tokyo Imperial University.

== Legacy ==
Manjirō apparently used his knowledge of western shipbuilding to contribute to the effort of the Shogunate to build a modern navy. He translated Bowditch's American Practical Navigator into Japanese, and taught English, naval tactics and whaling techniques. He allegedly contributed to the construction of the Shohei Maru, Japan's first post-seclusion foreign-style warship.

Manjirō was married three times and had seven children. In 1918, his eldest son, Dr. Nakahama Toichirō, donated a valuable sword to Fairhaven in token of his father's rescue and the kindness of the town. It continued to be displayed in the town library even during World War II when anti-Japanese sentiment was very high. After the sword was stolen in 1977, a replacement was given in 1982 and is still on display at the library.

Among his accomplishments, Manjirō was probably the first Japanese person to take a train, ride in a steamship, officer an American vessel, and command a trans-Pacific voyage.

There is a statue of Nakahama Manjirō at Cape Ashizuri, on Shikoku. However, his grave, formerly at the Zōshigaya Cemetery in Tokyo, was destroyed by American air raids in World War II. In Fairhaven, the Manjirō Historic Friendship Society renovated William Whitfield's home to include a museum dealing with the Manjirō legacy.

Minor planet 4841 Manjiro is named after him.

Many books have been published about Manjiro's life and journey, such as Heart of a Samurai by Margi Preus, Born in the Year of Courage by Emily Crofford, and Shipwrecked! The True Adventures of a Japanese Boy by Rhoda Blumberg.

A Manjiro Festival, sponsored by the Whitfield-Manjiro Friendship Society, is held in Fairhaven in early October of odd numbered years.

In 1852, Kawata Shoryo recorded Manjirō's experiences abroad in a four-volume manuscript titled Hyoson Kiryaku [Drifting to the Southeast]. The most complete surviving copy of the lost original resides at the Rosenbach Museum & Library in Philadelphia and includes sketches made by Manjirō. In 2020, the institution produced the exhibition Manjiro: Drifting, 1841-2020 in partnership with the Japan America Society of Greater Philadelphia.

Manjiro was referenced in a 2025 episode of the anime series Aharen-san wa Hakarenai.

== See also ==
- Hasekura Tsunenaga, one of the first recorded Japanese to reach the Americas, in 1614
- Tanaka Shōsuke, one of the first recorded Japanese to reach the Americas, in 1610
- Christopher and Cosmas, one of the first recorded Japanese to reach the Americas, as early as 1587
- Otokichi, a famous Japanese castaway to the British and American controlled Oregon Territory in 1834
- Moriyama Einosuke, another translator in the negotiation with Perry
- Ranald MacDonald, the first teacher of English in Japan (Moriyama Einosuke was one of MacDonald's students in Nagasaki in 1848)
- Shimazu Nariakira
- Joseph Heco, the first Japanese person to be naturalized as a United States citizen, in 1858
- Pacific Overtures, Stephen Sondheim and John Weidman's unconventional musical about the arrival of the black ships in Japan. Manjiro is a major character in it, although his story is highly dramatized.
