= Anatoly Trofimovich Chernousov =

Siberian Soviet writer (1937–2000)

Anatoly Trofimovich Chernousov (Russian: Анатолий Трофимович Черноусов; March 7, 1937 – June 24, 2000) was a Siberian writer. His father, Trofim Antonovich, died at the war front on August 3, 1943, and buried in the communal grave in the Voroshilovgrad region. Anatoly Chernousov was raised by his mother, Evdokiya Ivanovna, and his grandfather, Anton Fomich who taught him to “persevere in every work”. The writer's biography is typical for his time. His memories about his difficult postwar childhood amidst the native population of South-Western Siberia, the chaldons, served as a base for his novel The Chaldons.

== Biography ==
He was born in Novokarasuk, Omsk region. In 1959 he graduated from the Omsk Polytechnic Institute.

== Career ==
Chernousov worked as a design engineer at the Siblitmash factory, then taught engineering at the Novosibirsk Railway Transportation Institute. Parallel to this work, he was actively involved in social work as a Pioneer leader and a youth leader at the Physics and Mathematics school at Siberian Branch of USSR Academy of Sciences. He often traveled with his students.

In 1974, Anatoly Chernousov was admitted to the Union of Soviet Writers. Since 1975, his main literary activity is combined with the work in the journal Siberian Lights.

During Perestroika, Anatoly Chernousov led the Novosibirsk regional writers' organization.

== Works ==
In 1968, the "Siberian Lights" (Sibirskie ogni) publishes his first short story Engineer Zabrodin’s hobby. This first publication drew the attention of readers and critics with its acute psychological themes and characters.

Chernousov's first book, The crews must be prepared, was published in 1971 in the West Siberian publishing house. It announced the voice of a new type of protagonist: "We shouldn’t continue living like this, comrades. We need to find something new and interesting ..." In 1979, the novel The crews must be prepared was made by the national TV channel into a two-part music film Breakfast on the Grass.

In the novel Unusual task (1975), the protagonist, a young scientist Pavel Smirnov, is close to solving a scientific problem. However, in the middle of experimentation, he is sent to a collective farm to support students coming to assist villagers during the potato harvest. The novel tells the realities of village life in the Soviet times, and the relationship between Pavel and the students.

Shturmovshchina (rushed production), the Soviet industrial phenomenon, became the subject of the novel Intern (1975). The pervasive problem is seen through the eyes of an intern, student Andrey Skvortsov, who, with youthful enthusiasm, challenges his colleagues with a question they can not answer: "What will happen tomorrow?" This book was applauded by critics and the press.

Strangers (1979) tells the tragic love story of a couple - Valeriy Klimov, a professor and his student Lina Zima, a Baptist. After making love with Valeriy, Lina is afraid of being ostracized by her family and she kills herself. The author was surprised when the novel was used as a base for the atheist debates.

Second home (1984), a completely autobiographical novel, describes the chore of building a country house in the 80s. The author and his young family, eager to find an escape from the bustle of the city, move into the countryside. Their first experiences with gardening, and friendships with the natives are told with humor but are also melancholic.

Circles (1990) narrates a story of a draftsman Kostya Zarubin, his rejection of human indifference, callousness and cynicism. Faith and faithlessness, strangeness and ardor of first love are some of the themes of the novel.

Chernousov's novels and short stories appeared regularly in journals "Siberian Lights" (Sibirskie Ogni), "Smena", "Ural Ranger," (Uralskiy Sledopit), "Soviet Literature"(Sovetskaya literatura), "Our Contemporary” (Nash Sovremennik), in the "Roman-Gazeta", and the "Literary Gazette" (Literaturnaya gazeta). Many short stories were translated and published in Bulgaria, Hungary, and Poland.

== Personal life ==
Backpacking, trekking and skiing, Chernousov crossed the Carpathians mountings, Polesye (Belorussia), Crimea, Caucasus, the Altai Mountains, Sayan, Mountain Shoria, the Baltics, the Volga, the Urals and the Caspian Sea. He also went kayaking on the Irtysh, boating at the Teletskoye Lake, on the Angara, Lake Baikal and the Dnieper. Chernousov descended to the caves with the speliologues and took part in expeditions to the site of the meteorite Tunguska. During the Soviet time, when foreign travel was often out of reach for the Intelligentsia, he visited Italy, Greece, India, and Ceylon.

In 1973, he married Anna Pavlovna Pavlyukevich (Moscow Polygraphic Institute graduate in Publishing and Journalism, 1974). They had two daughters, Julia (1974) and Olga (1984).

On June 24, 2000, he died in Novosibirsk.

== Recognition ==
- Order "Badge of Honor" (1987)

== Bibliography ==
- The Crews must be prepared (novels and short stories, Novosibirsk, West-Siberian Publishing House, 1971)
- Young people (novels: "Unusual task", "Intern", Moscow Publishing House "Young Guard" (Molodaya Gvardiya), 1975)
- Unusual task (Novosibirsk, West-Siberian Publishing House, 1976)
- Do what you came for (novels and short stories, "Young Guard", 1978)
- Chaldony (novel, Novosibirsk, West-Siberian Publishing House, 1982)
- Strangers (Novosibirsk, West-Siberian Publishing House, 1979)
- The second house (novel, Novosibirsk, West-Siberian publishing house, 1984)
- Ex-officio (Po sovmestitelstvu) (novel, short stories, Moscow, "Soviet writer," 1986)
- Predestination (stories, Novosibirsk Publishing House, 1986)
- Novels ("Intern", "Strangers", "Second home", Novosibirsk Publishing House, 1987)
- Circles (novel, Novosibirsk Publishing House, 1990)
