= Japanese Embassy to the United States =

1860 Japanese diplomatic mission to the U.S.

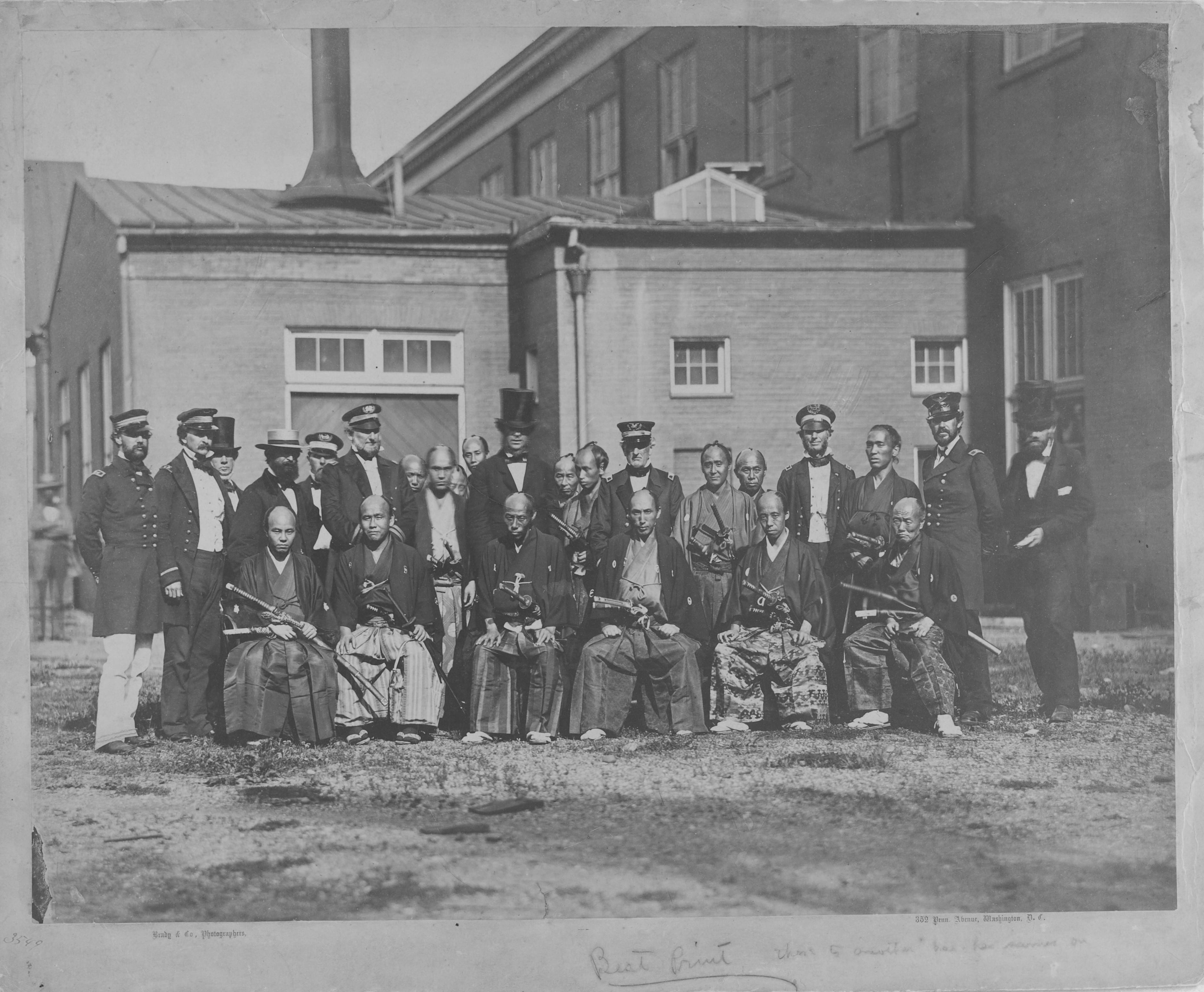
The Embassy at the Washington D.C. shipyard: Vice-Ambassador Muragaki Norimasa (third from left), Ambassador Shinmi Masaoki (middle), and Oguri Tadamasa (second from right)

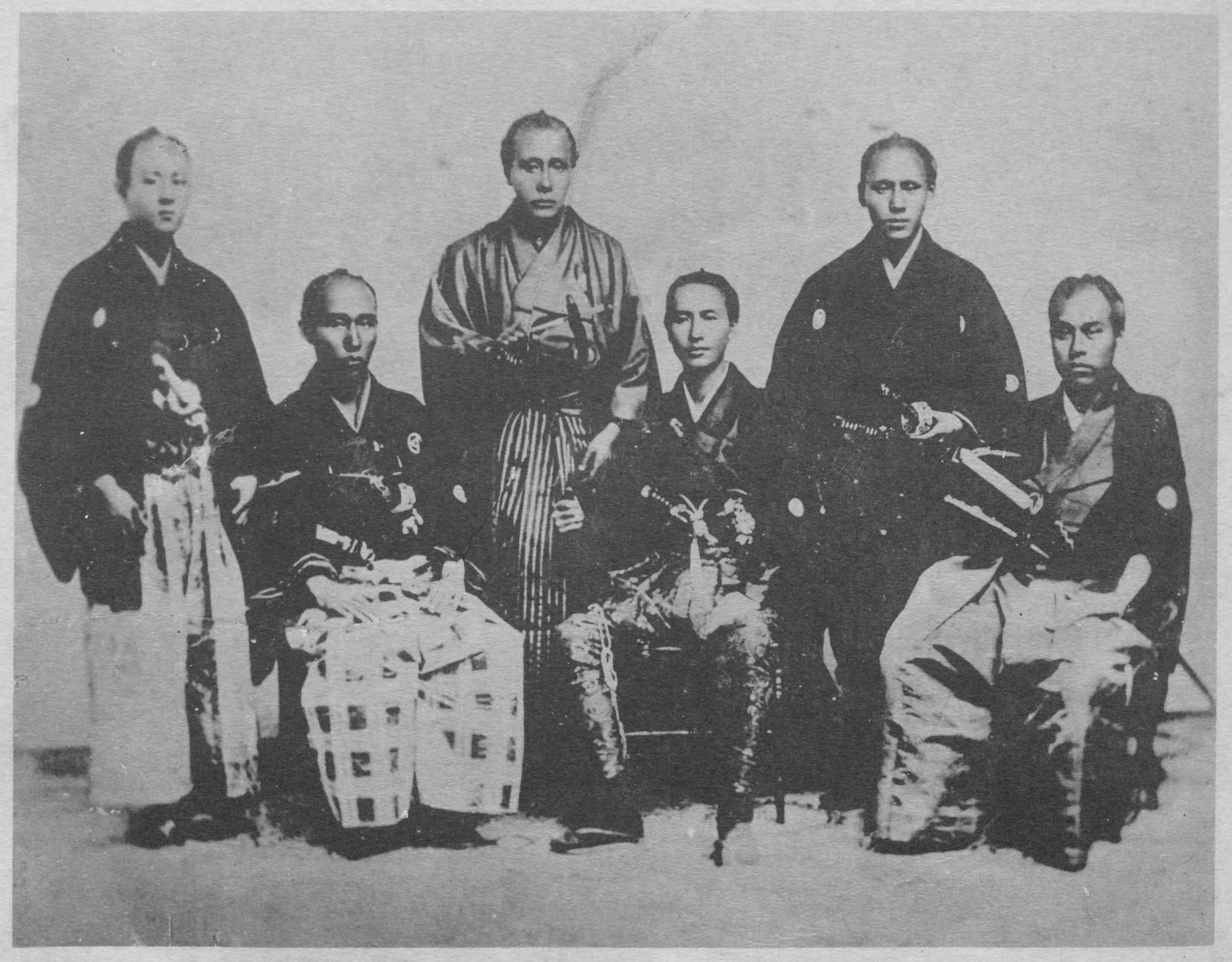
Sailors of the Kanrin Maru, the Embassy's escort; from right, Fukuzawa Yukichi, Okada Seizō, Hida Hamagorō, Konagai Gohachirō, Hamaguchi Yoemon, Nezu Kinjirō.

The Japanese Embassy to the United States (万延元年遣米使節, Man'en gannen kenbei shisetsu; lit. First year of the Man'en era mission to America) was dispatched in 1860 by the Tokugawa shogunate (bakufu). Its objective was to ratify the new Treaty of Friendship, Commerce, and Navigation between the United States and Japan, in addition to being Japan's first diplomatic mission to the United States since the 1854 opening of Japan by Commodore Matthew Perry.

Another significant facet of the mission was the shogunate's dispatch of a Japanese warship, the Kanrin Maru, to accompany the delegation across the Pacific and thereby demonstrate the degree to which Japan had mastered Western navigation techniques and ship technologies barely six years after ending its isolation policy of nearly 250 years.

== Background ==
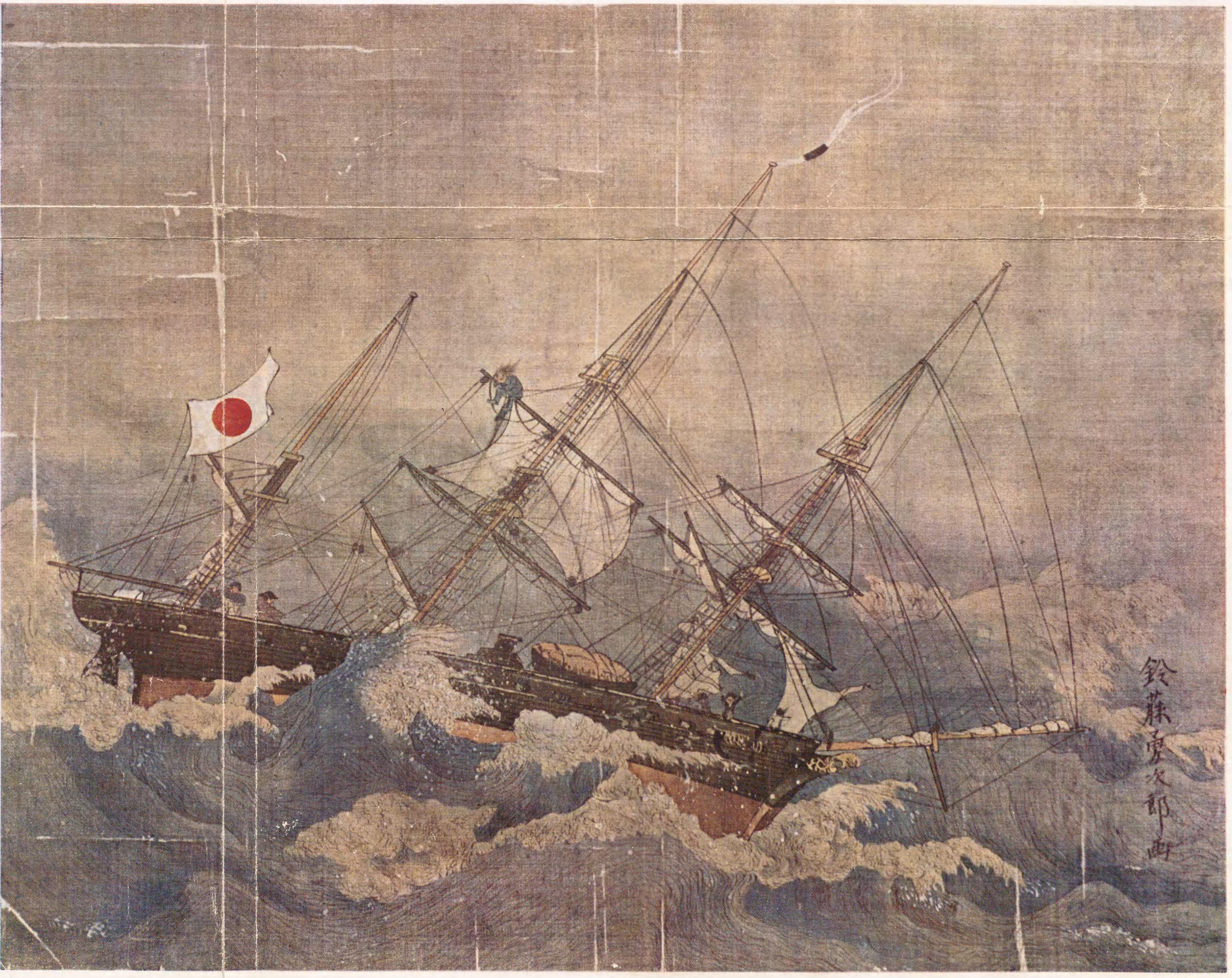
Kanrin Maru (circa 1860)

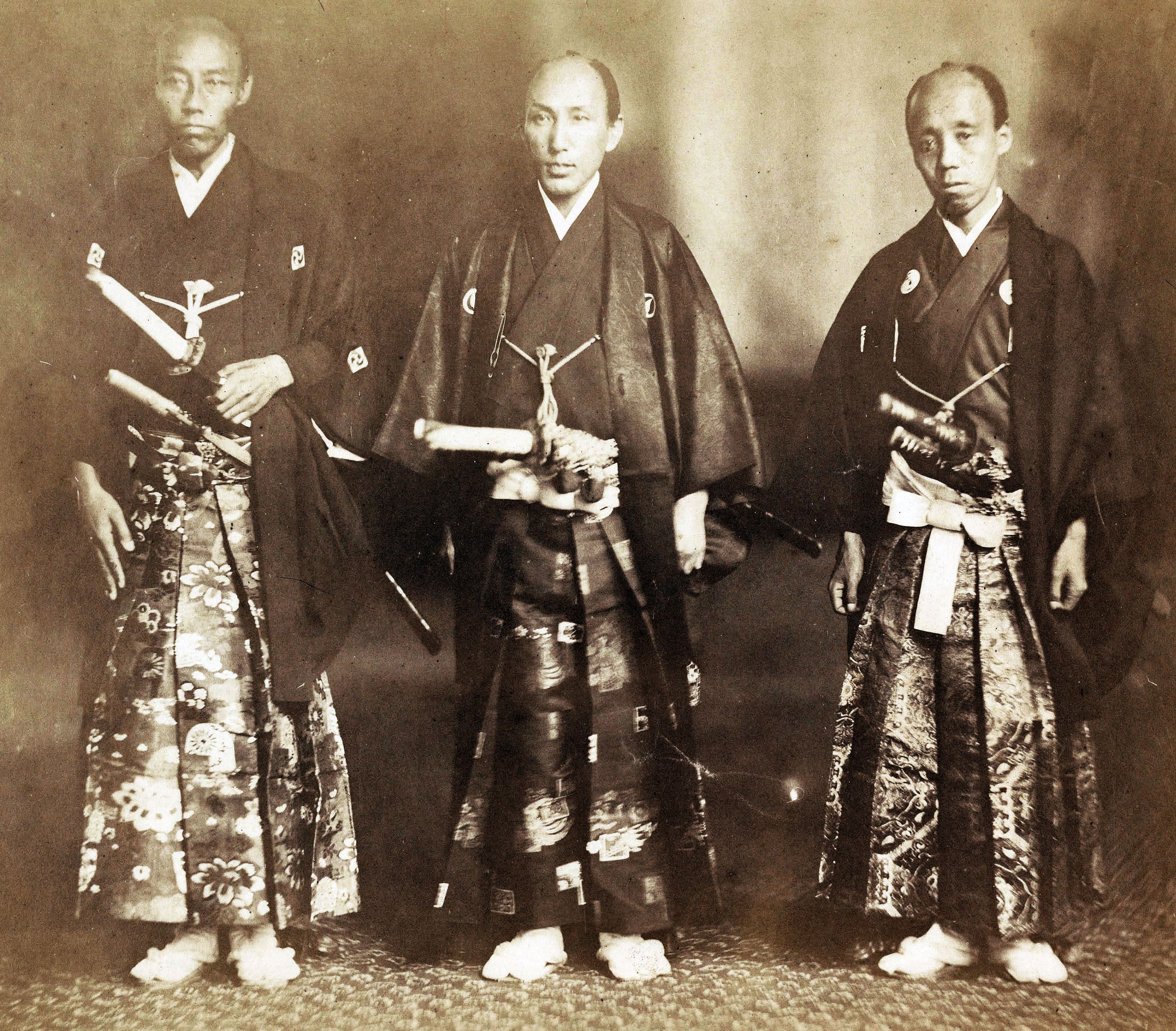
The three plenipotentiary members of the Japanese embassy: Muragaki Norimasa, Shinmi Masaoki, and Oguri Tadamasa.

On February 9 (January 19 in the Japanese calendar), 1860, the Kanrin Maru set sail from Uraga for San Francisco under the leadership of Captain Katsu Kaishū, with Nakahama "John" Manjiro as the official translator, carrying 96 Japanese men and an American officer, John M. Brooke on board. The overall head of the mission was Admiral Kimura Yoshitake, a high ranking Shogunate official. Fukuzawa Yukichi, the future educator and reformer, had volunteered his services as an assistant to Admiral Kimura.

The Japanese embassy itself traveled aboard a U.S. Navy ship, the USS Powhatan, which the Kanrin Maru escorted - albeit taking a different route across the Pacific and arriving before the Powhatan. The Japanese embassy was formally composed of three men: Ambassador Shinmi Masaoki (新見正興), Vice-Ambassador Muragaki Norimasa (村垣範正), and Observer Oguri Tadamasa (小栗忠順).

== Destinations ==
=== San Francisco ===
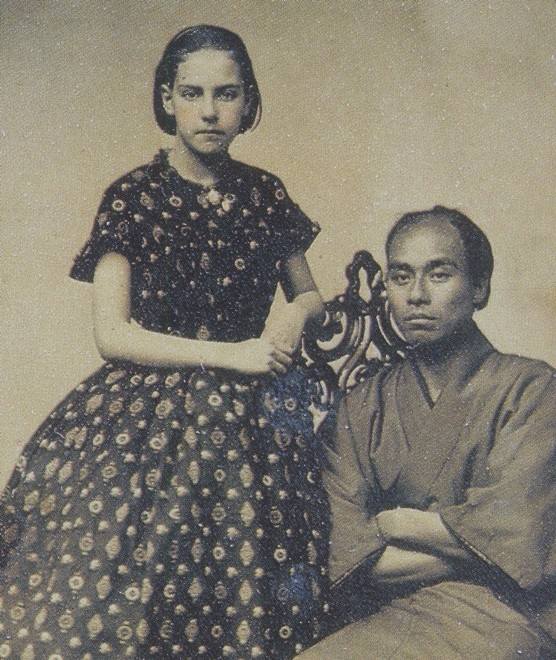
Fukuzawa Yukichi with Theodora Alice in San Francisco, 1860.

The Kanrin Maru reached San Francisco directly, but the Powhatan (and the embassy) made a stopover in the Kingdom of Hawaii first, where they were greeted by King Kamehameha IV and Queen Emma. When it arrived in San Francisco on March 29th, the delegation stayed for a month, touring the city's notable locations and being received by the mayor, and Fukuzawa had himself photographed with an American girl, a photo that has since become one of the most famous in Japanese history. Fukuzawa also acquired an English–Chinese Webster's Dictionary, from which he began to study English seriously and prepare his own English–Japanese dictionary.

=== Washington, D.C., New York, and the return ===
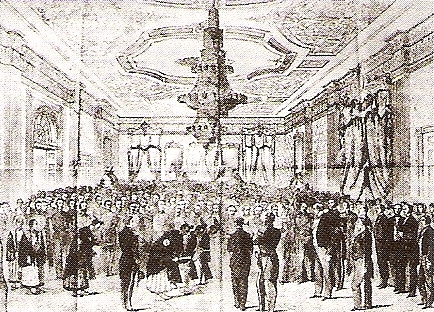
Reception at the White House

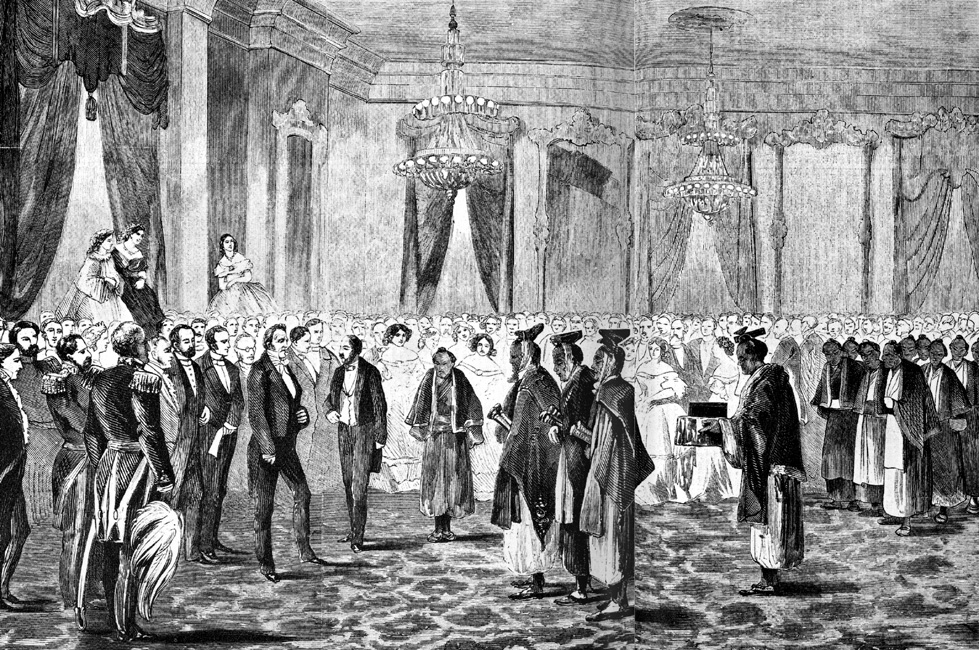
President James Buchanan receiving the Embassy.

The Kanrin Maru was originally intended to accompany the Japanese embassy to Washington, but due to the severe damage she sustained in her journey over the Pacific, she was drydocked and was due to return to Japan after being repaired, the Powhatan continued with the Embassy to Panama, where its members crossed the isthmus to the Atlantic via the recently opened Panama Railway. Changing ships for the USS Roanoke, the 72-man diplomatic mission then proceeded to Washington, D.C. The Roanoke had been situated in Panama for nearly a year for this purpose. After being received with customary gun salutes, the Roanoke was underway by April 26th for New York.

The Roanoke arrived at New York bay after two weeks, but was instructed to proceed to Hampton Roads to convey the embassy to the president, who had moved to Washington at the time. The Roanoke arrived at Hampton Roads on May 12th, which was extremely crowded with onlookers who flocked to see the Japanese. The embassy debarked and was cordially received, they boarded a steamer and continued by river to Washington and debarked at the Navy Yard on May 14th. The embassy turned down a lot of invitations and banquets on the way, desiring to meet with the president as fast as possible. Washington was filled with thousands of onlookers who wished to see the Embassy. Numerous receptions were held in its honor, including the grandest one at the White House, where the ambassadors met President James Buchanan and presented to him the Harris Treaty. The White House had been obscenely crowded by curious onlookers, significantly ladies, during this occasion. Buchanan presented them with a gold watch engraved with his likeness as a gift to the shogun. Buchanan and many others desired that the ambassadors tour the United States, but the ambassadors unwaveringly refused all of these offers, desiring to convey the results of their diplomatic mission as fast as possible to the Shogunate.

The Japanese delegation traveled north to Philadelphia. Their attention to activities planned by local officials was distracted by the news of what became known as the "Sakuradamon Incident" in Tokyo. The Tairō Ii Naosuke had been assassinated on March 24; and accounts of the event were sped by the Pony Express across the American continent. This murdered official had been the highest ranking signer of the Japanese-American 1858 "Harris Treaty", which was a follow-up to the 1854 Treaty of Kanagawa.

The delegation continued on to New York City, where their procession up Broadway from the Battery was a grand parade.

From New York, they crossed the Atlantic and Indian Oceans, all on board the USS Niagara, thus completing a circumnavigation. After leaving New York on June 30, the Niagara reached the harbor at Porto Grande, Cape Verde Islands, on July 16. Other ports on the voyage back to Japan included São Paulo-de-Loande (now Luanda), Angola; Batavia (now Jakarta), Java; and Hong Kong. The frigate finally sailed into Tokyo Bay on November 8 to disembark her passengers.

== Significance ==
The Kanrin Maru’s voyage from Uraga to San Francisco is often cited as the first crossing of the Pacific by an all-Japanese crew sailing on a Japanese ship, although the crew were advised by John M. Brooke. However, the Kanrin Maru’s was not the first Pacific crossing by a Japanese ship and crew: at least three such journeys had been made in the 17th century, before Japan's period of isolation: those by Tanaka Shōsuke in 1610, Hasekura Tsunenaga in 1614, and Yokozawa Shōgen in 1616.

== See also ==
- Bernardo the Japanese, the first Japanese to visit Europe, in 1553
- Tenshō embassy, first Japanese embassy to visit Europe, in 1582
- Hasekura Tsunenaga, lead the Keichō Embassy, a diplomatic mission from 1613 through 1620,
- First Japanese Embassy to Europe, in actuality the third embassy to Europe
- Second Japanese Embassy to Europe
