= Jock Tradd =

Australian rugby league footballer

'Jock' Tradd
Personal information
- Full name: Joffre Peter Tradd
- Born: 14 November 1922; Strathfield, New South Wales, Australia
- Died: 7 June 2000 (aged 77); Warrawong, New South Wales, Australia

Playing information
- Position: Lock
Club
Years	Team	Pld	T	G	FG	P
1946	St. George	3	1	0	0	3

Joffre Peter 'Jock' Tradd (or Trad) (1922–2000) was an Australian rugby league footballer who played in the 1940s.

== Playing career ==
Tradd came to the St. George club from the N.S.W, South Coast for one season in 1946. A handy lock-forward, he was noted for his defensive game. Injuries disrupted his season with only limited appearances for the Red V. He trialled with the North Sydney club in 1947, before finishing his career as Captain/coach of the Gerringong rugby league club in 1950.

== War service ==
Tradd also enlisted in the Australian Army in World War II.

== Death ==
Tradd died on 7 June 2000 in Warrawong, New South Wales age 77.
