= Isaak Bubis =

Isaak Markovich Bubis (1 January 1910 — 5 June 2000) was a Moldavian Soviet engineer and architect.

Born in Chișinău, after graduating from high school he studied at the Prague Polytechnic. From 1941 to 1945, he worked on railway construction near Stalingrad. Back in Bessarabia, he was the chief engineer of the Chișinău Master Plan for the reconstruction of the city centre (1947–1967).
