= Emily Crofford =

American writer (1927–2000)

Emily Ardell Crofford (March 3, 1927 – June 4, 2000) was an American author of books for both children and adults.

== Life and career ==
Emily Crofford was born in Lake Providence, Louisiana on March 3, 1927. Her children's book Born in the Year of Courage was released in September 1991 through Lerner Publishing Group. It is the true story of Nakahama Manjirō, a Japanese fisherman who was rescued by an American ship in the mid-19th-century. Reception for the book was mostly positive, with the School Library Journal praising the book. Crofford died on June 4, 2000, at the age of 73.
