= Gewehr =

German word for rifle

Gewehr is the German word for a long-barreled firearm such as a rifle or shotgun. The word is also used extensively in German to form compound words that describe specific types of service weapons, such as scharfschützengewehr (sniper rifle), sturmgewehr (assault rifle) and maschinengewehr (machine gun).

== Etymology ==
The word itself comes from Middle High German gewer, from Old High German giwerida, equivalent to ge + Wehr. Hence, the word "gewehr" is related to "Wehr", which meant "defense", and so it became the standard term for military-type weapons.

== History ==
Prior to the 1840s, rifled guns were not widespread, and firearms were smoothbore muzzleloaders termed Büchse (a term that is still used in German hunting jargon today). The term "Gewehr" can be encountered in the context of 19th and 20th century military history for nonspecific rifles from German-speaking countries, e.g. in arms trade, in particular for types produced before German unification in 1871.

== Types ==
Specific types, sorted chronologically from 1841 to 2025 and with designer given, are:

- Gewehr 41 (Dreyse, 1841)
- Gewehr 71 (Mauser, 1871)
- Gewehr 88 (state committee, 1888)
- Gewehr 98 (Mauser, 1898)
- T-Gewehr (Mauser, 1918)
- Gewehr 41 (Walther, 1941)
- Gewehr 43 (Walther, 1943)
- Sturmgewehr 44 (CITEFA/Schmeisser, 1944)
- Gewehr 36 (Heckler & Koch, 1997)
- Gewehr 95 (Heckler & Koch, 1997)

== See also ==
- German military rifles
