= Japanese warship Shōhei Maru =

Japanese frigate

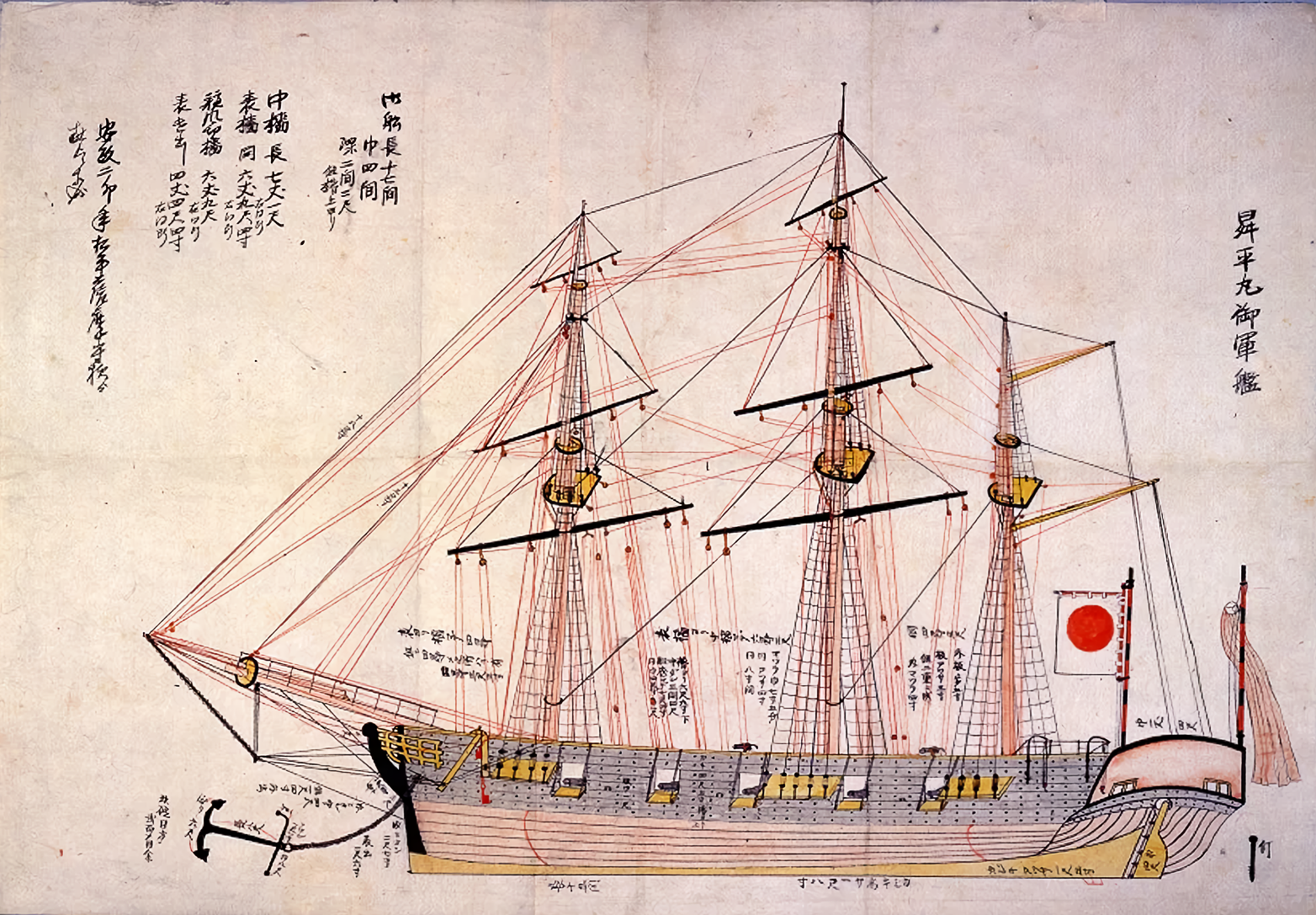
- A drawing of the Shōhei Maru, c. 1855

History
- Builder: Sakurajima, Kagoshima, Japan
- Laid down: May 1853
- Commissioned: December 1854
- Stricken: 1870
- Fate: Wrecked, March 1870

General characteristics
- Length: 31 metres (102 ft)
- Beam: 7.3 metres (24 ft)
- Sail plan: Barque-rigged
- Armament: 10 guns

Shōhei Maru (昇平丸) was a sailing frigate constructed on orders of the Tokugawa shogunate of Bakumatsu period Japan by Satsuma Domain in response to the Perry Expedition and increasing incursions of foreign warships into Japanese territorial waters. She was built from 1853 to 1854 at Sakurajima in what is now Kagoshima Prefecture. Shōhei Maru should not be confused with the World War II passenger/cargo vessel of the same name, sunk by the submarine USS Spadefish off Korea.

== Background ==
Since the beginning of the seventeenth century, the Tokugawa shogunate ruling Japan pursued a policy of isolating the country from outside influences. Foreign trade was maintained only with the Dutch and the Chinese and was conducted exclusively at Nagasaki under a strict government monopoly. No foreigners were allowed to set foot in Japan, and no Japanese was permitted to travel abroad. In June 1635 a law was proclaimed prohibiting the construction of large, ocean-capable vessels. However, by the early nineteenth century, this policy of isolation was increasingly under challenge. In 1846, an official American expedition led by Commodore James Biddle visited on an official mission with two ships, including one warship armed with 72 cannons, asking for ports to be opened for trade, but his requests for a trade agreement were refused.

Following the July 1853 visit of Commodore Perry, an intense debate erupted within the Japanese government on how to handle the unprecedented threat to the nation’s capital, and the only universal consensus was that steps be taken immediately to bolster Japan’s coastal defenses. The law forbidding construction of large vessels was repealed, and many of the feudal domains took immediate steps to construct or purchase warships. These included the Hōō Maru constructed by the Uraga bugyō office, and the Asahi Maru constructed by Mito Domain.

Citing the need to protect Japanese sovereignty over the Ryukyu Islands, Satsuma daimyō Shimazu Nariakira successfully petitioned the Tokugawa shogunate to lift the prohibition on the construction of large ocean-going vessels in December 1852. A shipyard was constructed on Sakurajima and the new vessel was launched in May 1853 even before the July 1853 visit of Commodore Perry, and his fleet of "Black Ships" to Edo Bay.

Shōhei Maru took longer to complete than was anticipated, and was commissioned on December 12, 1854, almost six months after Hōō Maru was completed.

== Design ==
Shōhei Maru was a three-masted barque-rigged sailing vessel, with an overall length of 31.0 m (101 ft 8 in), beam of 7.3 m (23 ft 11 in), and displacement of 370 tons. Of wooden construction, she was depicted in contemporary artwork as being armed with five cannon on each beam. Her sails had black bands, characteristic of Tokugawa naval vessels. She was depicted in an 1855 print as flying the rising sun flag. The new ship was apparently built using manuals obtained from the Netherlands via the trading outpost of Dejima, and occasional observations of foreign vessels roaming the waters off Japan. Nakahama Manjirō may have contributed to its design from his personal experiences, but this is uncertain.

== Service record ==
Shōhei Maru was transferred to Edo in February 1855 and commissioned into the Tokugawa shogunate navy in August 1855. It was later assigned to the Nagasaki Naval Training Center as a training vessel.

Following the Boshin War of the Meiji Restoration, Shōhei Maru was seized by the new Meiji government, but was considered too obsolete for use by the fledgling Imperial Japanese Navy and was assigned to the Colonization Ministry together with the Kanrin Maru and as a transport for the development of the northern island of Hokkaidō. She was wrecked after she ran aground on a sandbar off what is now Kaminokuni, Hokkaidō (41°52′N 140°07′E) after a storm on 2 March 1870.
