= Japanese warship Hōō Maru =

Western-style sail frigate

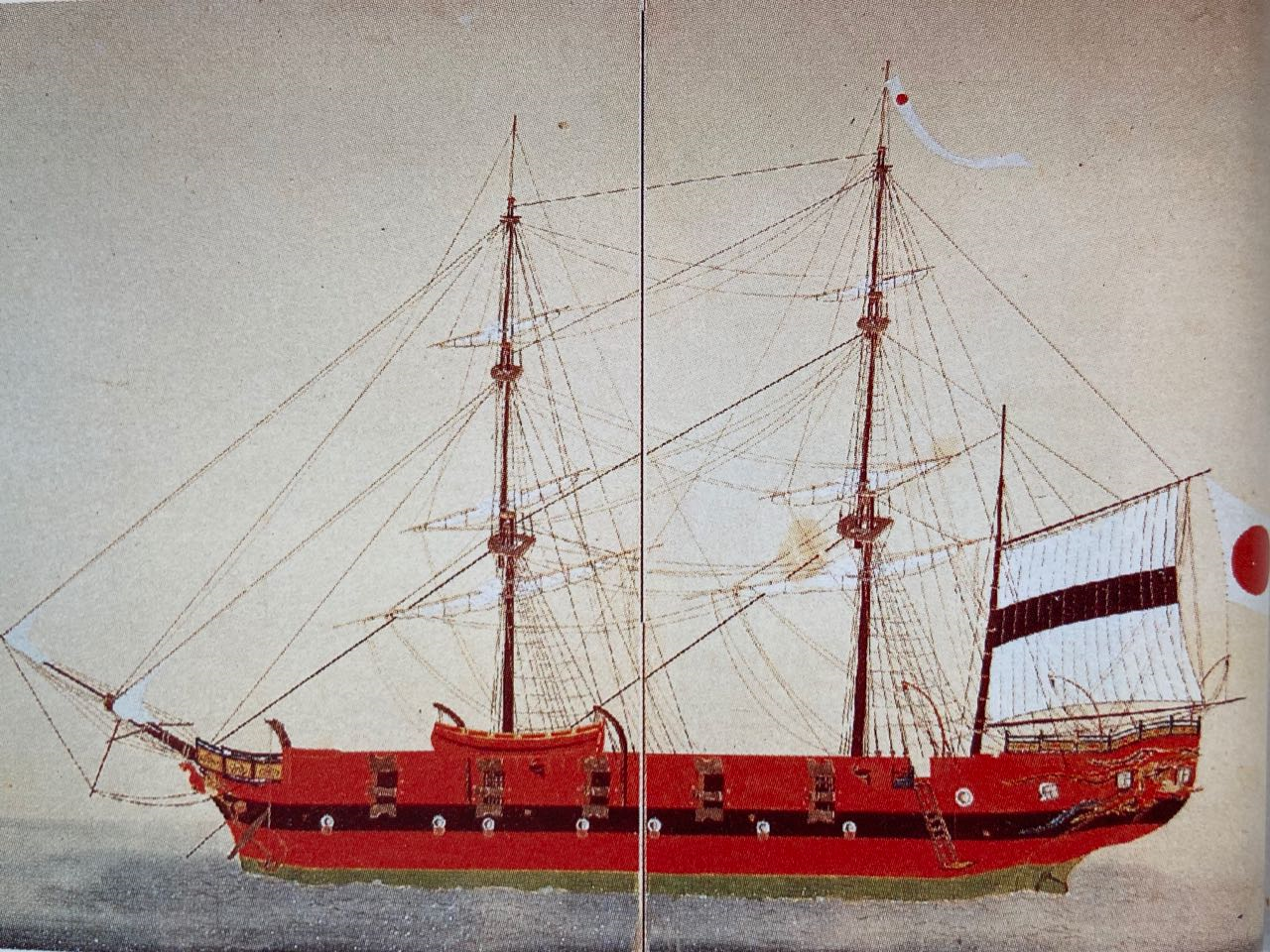
- Japanese warship Hōō Maru

History

Japan
- Name: Hōō Maru
- Builder: Uraga shipyard
- Laid down: October 22, 1853
- Commissioned: June 6, 1854

General characteristics
- Displacement: 600 long tons (610 t)
- Length: 36.4 m (119 ft 5 in)
- Beam: 9.1 m (29 ft 10 in)
- Draught: 4.5 m (14 ft 9 in)
- Sail plan: Barque
- Armament: 10 cannon

Hōō Maru (鳳凰丸; Phoenix) was a western-style sail frigate, constructed by the Tokugawa shogunate of Bakumatsu period Japan in response to the Perry Expedition and increasing incursions of foreign warships into Japanese territorial waters.

== Background ==
Since the beginning of the seventeenth century, the Tokugawa shogunate ruling Japan pursued a policy of isolating the country from outside influences. Foreign trade was maintained only with the Dutch and the Chinese and was conducted exclusively at Nagasaki under a strict government monopoly. No foreigners were allowed to set foot in Japan, and no Japanese was permitted to travel abroad. In June 1635 a law was proclaimed prohibiting the construction of large, ocean-capable vessels. However, by the early nineteenth century, this policy of isolation was increasingly under challenge. In 1846, an official American expedition led by Commodore James Biddle on an official mission with two ships, including one warship armed with 72 cannons, asking for ports to be opened for trade, but his requests for a trade agreement were refused. Following this incident, a Western-style sloop, Soshun Maru, was constructed at Uraga, partly based on observations of Biddle's ship by local shipwrights. Following the July 1853 visit of Commodore Perry, an intense debate erupted within the Japanese government on how to handle the unprecedented threat to the nation's capital, and the only universal consensus was that steps be taken immediately to bolster Japan's coastal defenses. The law forbidding construction of large vessels was repealed, and many of the feudal domains took immediate steps to construct or purchase warships. These included the Shōhei Maru constructed by Satsuma Domain and the Asahi Maru constructed by Mito Domain.

The Uraga bugyō, Nakajima Saburosuke (中島三郎助), also received permission from senior rōjū Abe Masahiro to build a new vessel. The project was headed by Nakajima and the local yoriki and dōshin, although the actual design work on the vessel was done by local shipwrights. The construction of the new vessel started on October 23, 1853, and was completed on June 6, 1854.

== Design ==
Hōō Maru was a three-masted barque-rigged sailing vessel, with an overall length of 36.4 meters. Of wooden construction, her hull was painted with red lacquer, and she was sheathed in copper to the waterline. Her armament consisted of ten muzzle-loading cannon (4 large, 6 small). Her sails had black bands, which was characteristic of Tokugawa naval vessels.

== Operational history ==
Hōō Maru was already obsolete by the time of her completion, and although she handled well, she was no match as a warship for the steam-powered vessels of the western powers. She was used primarily as a troop transport by the Tokugawa Navy. During the Boshin War, she escaped Edo prior to its fall to forces of the Satchō Alliance, and went to Sendai Domain, from which she joined Enomoto Takeaki’s fleet and sailed for in December 1868. After the Naval Battle of Hakodate Bay, and the fall of the Goryōkaku, she sailed on July 15, 1869, with 305 colonists for Muroran, where she was seized by the Japanese government.

After the Meiji restoration, the new Meiji government assigned her to the Ministry of War and subsequently to the Ministry of the Treasury.
