= Japanese warship Asahi Maru =

Western-style sail frigate (1856)

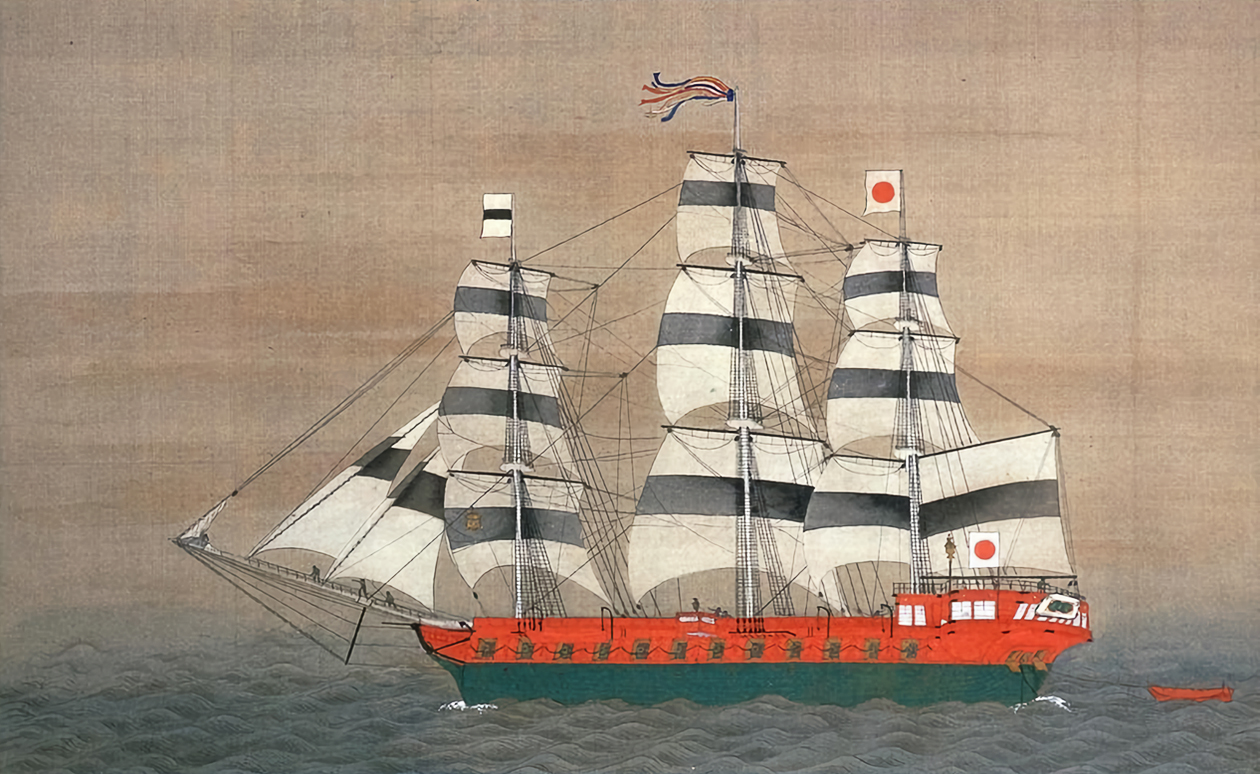
- Asahi Maru

History

Japan
- Name: Asahi Maru
- Laid down: 1854
- Launched: 1855
- Commissioned: June 1856

General characteristics
- Tonnage: 750 long tons (760 t)
- Length: 42.3 m (138 ft 9 in)
- Beam: 9.1 m (29 ft 10 in)
- Draught: 7.2 m (23 ft 7 in)
- Sail plan: Full-rigged ship
- Armament: 20 cannon (?)

Asahi Maru (旭日丸) was a western-style sail frigate, constructed on orders the Tokugawa shogunate of Bakumatsu period Japan by Mito Domain in response to the Perry Expedition and increasing incursions of foreign warships into Japanese territorial waters. She was built from 1854 to 1856 on land adjacent to Mito Domain's Edo residence at a site which later became IHI Shipyards, i.e. Ishikawajima island, at the mouth of the Sumida River, in Tokyo.

== Background ==
Since the beginning of the seventeenth century, the Tokugawa shogunate ruling Japan pursued a policy of isolating the country from outside influences. Foreign trade was maintained only with the Dutch and the Chinese and was conducted exclusively at Nagasaki under a strict government monopoly. No foreigners were allowed to set foot in Japan, and no Japanese was permitted to travel abroad. In June 1635 a law was proclaimed prohibiting the construction of large, ocean-capable vessels. However, by the early nineteenth century, this policy of isolation was increasingly under challenge. In 1846, an official American expedition led by Commodore James Biddle on an official mission with two ships, including one warship armed with 72 cannons, asking for ports to be opened for trade, but his requests for a trade agreement were refused.

Following the July 1853 visit of Commodore Perry, an intense debate erupted within the Japanese government on how to handle the unprecedented threat to the nation's capital, and the only universal consensus was that steps be taken immediately to bolster Japan's coastal defenses. The law forbidding construction of large vessels was repealed, and many of the feudal domains took immediate steps to construct or purchase warships. These included the Hōō Maru constructed by the Uraga bugyō office, and the Shōhei Maru constructed by Satsuma Domain.

The former daimyō of Mito Domain, Mito Nariaki was regarded as one of the foremost experts on military matters within the Japanese government, and was a strong proponent of rangaku studies to acquire military technology from the European powers. The domain had already experiments with small, western-based designs in the 1840s in secret. In December 1853, the domain received official authority from Shōgun Tokugawa Iesada to construct a large warship, based on designs and reverse-engineering from textbooks and reference materials acquired from the Dutch. The new vessel was launched in 1855 with some difficulty, and was named and commissioned into service in June 1856.

== Design ==
Asahi Maru was a three-masted fully-rigged sailing vessel, with an overall length of 42.3 metres (139 ft), beam of 9.1 metres (30 ft), and draught 7.2 metres (24 ft), displacing 750 tons. Of wooden construction, her hull was painted with red lacquer, and she was sheathed in copper to the waterline. She was depicted in contemporary artwork as being armed with ten cannon on each side. Her sails had black bands, which was characteristic of Tokugawa naval vessels. She was depicted in an 1859 print as flying the rising sun flag.

== Operational history ==
Asahi Maru was already obsolete by the time of her completion, and she was no match as a warship for the steam-powered vessels of the western powers. She was used primarily as a troop transport by the Tokugawa Navy, and although part of the Tokugawa forces at the Second Chōshū expedition, she made a negligible contribution. After the Boshin War, she was sold by new Meiji government to a private shipowner, and became a coastal transport.
