= Uraga bugyō =

Tokugawa dock officials in Uraga

Uraga bugyō (浦賀奉行) were officials of the Tokugawa shogunate with responsibility for administration of the port of Uraga, which was a port of inspection for Japanese coastal vessels, especially those proceeding to Edo.

This office was created in 1721, and it was held by one or two fudai daimyōs—always two who were appointed concurrently after 1844. Conventional interpretations have construed these Japanese titles as "commissioner" or "overseer" or "governor".

Uraga is both a town and a harbour at the entrance of Tokyo Bay, located on the eastern side of the Miura Peninsula, at the northern end of the Uraga Channel.

== Strategic location ==
Due to its strategic location at the entrance of Edo Bay, Uraga has often been the first point of contact between visiting foreign ships and Japan. In 1853, Commodore Perry lowered the anchor of his ships in front of Uraga. On the return of the Commodore's squadron in 1854, the ships by-passed Uraga to anchor closer to Edo at Kanagawa, which is where the city of Yokohama now stands.

== List of Uraga bugyō ==
- Toki Yorimune (1844–1845).
- Mizuno Tadanori (1852–1853).
- Izawa Masayoshi (1854).
- Toki Tomoaki (1854–1857).

== See also ==
- Bugyō
